= Lianne Halfon =

American film producer

- Born: April 7, 1978 (age 48)
- Occupation: Film producer
- Years active: 1991–present
- Title: Principal of Mr. Mudd; Producing Discipline Head of AFI Conservatory

Lianne Halfon (born April 7, 1978) is an American film and television producer and partner of Mr. Mudd, a production company founded in 1998 with John Malkovich and Russell Smith.

Halfon has produced critically acclaimed and award-winning independent films, including Ghost World, Juno, and The Perks of Being a Wallflower.

Since 2018, Halfon has served as the Head of the Producing Discipline at the AFI Conservatory.

== Awards & recognition ==
In 2008, Halfon was nominated for an Academy Award for her work on Juno. That same year, she won an Independent Spirit Award for Juno, and again in 2013 for The Perks of Being a Wallflower.

Academy Awards

Year	Category	Title	Result
2008	Best Picture	Juno	Nominated

Independent Spirit Awards

Year	Category	Title	Result
2008	Best Film	Juno	Won
2013	Best First Feature	The Perks of Being a Wallflower	Won

Producers Guild of America

Year	Category	Title	Result
2008	Best Theatrical Motion Picture	Juno	Nominated

== Filmography ==
=== Film ===
As producer, unless otherwise noted.

Year	Title	Director(s)	Notes
1991	Crooked Hearts	Michael Bortman	Associate Producer
1993	House of Cards	Michael Lessac	
1994	Crumb	Terry Zwigoff	as Executive Producer
1999	A Good Baby	Katherine Dieckmann	
2001	Ghost World	Terry Zwigoff	
2001	The Loner	Gregori Viens	
2002	The Dancer Upstairs	John Malkovich	as Executive Producer
2002	How to Draw a Bunny	John W. Walter	as Executive Producer
2003	Kill the Poor	Alan Taylor	
2004	The Libertine	Laurence Dunmore	
2006	Art School Confidential	Terry Zwigoff	
2007	Juno	Jason Reitman	
2009	Which Way Home	Rebecca Cammisa	as Executive Producer
2010	Abel	Diego Luna	as Executive Producer
2011	Jeff, Who Lives at Home	Jay Duplass, Mark Duplass	
2011	Young Adult	Jason Reitman	
2012	The Perks of Being a Wallflower	Stephen Chbosky	
2013	Labor Day	Jason Reitman	
2014	Cesar Chavez	Diego Luna	
2015	Demolition	Jean-Marc Vallée	

=== Television (as producer) ===
Year	Title	Director/Creator	Notes
2004	The First Amendment Project: Some Assembly Required	John W. Walter (Director)	Documentary
