= Andrew L. Moore =

American photographer and filmmaker (born 1957)

Andrew Lambdin Moore (born 26 March, 1957) is an American photographer and filmmaker known for large format color photographs of Detroit, Cuba, Russia, the American High Plains, and New York's Times Square theaters. Moore's photographs employ the formal vocabularies of architectural and landscape photography and the narrative approaches of documentary photography and journalism to detail remnants of societies in transition. His photographic essays have been published in monographs, anthologies, and magazines including The New York Times Magazine, Time, The New Yorker, National Geographic, Harper's Magazine, The New York Review of Books, Fortune, Wired, and Art in America. Moore's video work has been featured on PBS and MTV; his feature-length documentary about the artist Ray Johnson, How to Draw a Bunny, won the Special Jury Prize at the 2002 Sundance Film Festival. Moore teaches in the MFA Photography, Video and Related Media program at the School of Visual Arts in New York.

== Early life ==
Andrew Lambdin Moore, born March 26, 1957, grew up in Old Greenwich, Connecticut. His father Sydney Hart Moore, was a commercial architect, and his mother Patricia Lambdin Moore, was an editor at the New York Graphic Society, a fine art publisher. Moore's parents supported his early interest in photography; his father built him an attic darkroom and his mother introduced him to the works of Peter Beard, whose book, Eyelids of the Morning, a study of Nile crocodiles on Lake Rudolf, was being published by NYGS. Beard learned of Moore's interest in photography and signed two prints to him from this series. Moore is related to the Victorian era artists George Cochran Lambdin, known for his paintings of flowers, and Alfred A. Hart, an official photographer for the Central Pacific Railroad, who documented the construction of the western half of the first transcontinental railroad.

In 1975, Moore enrolled at Princeton University, where he worked on an independent major in photography under the guidance and mentorship of the historian Peter Bunnell and the photographer Emmet Gowin, who at the time, was completing his first monograph. During that time, Moore also had the benefit of working with visiting artists including Frederick Sommer, Jim Dow, and Joel Meyerowitz. Moore graduated summa cum laude in 1979.

== Early career ==
After a brief stint working with commercial photographers in New York City, Moore moved to New Orleans, where he continued a body of work first started for his senior thesis. Over the next two years, he focused on the city's disappearing commercial district, where he found subjects such as a coffin workshop, a broom factory, and a raw furrier–places employing artisans and out-dated machinery. The New Orleans Downtown Development District awarded Moore a grant which enabled him to produce a portfolio of one-hundred 8x10 color contact prints, which were placed in the city's archives.

In 1981, Moore returned to New York City, where he began a three-year project documenting the rapid changes to the urban landscape, specifically at the South Street Seaport and Fulton Fish Market in lower Manhattan. At the start of his project, demolition for the present marketplace and shopping pier was just getting under way. Moore returned many times over the following months, often photographing at night to portray the architecture and ambiance of the surrounding neighborhood amidst massive, rapid transformation. For this work, Moore and two other photographers, Barbara Mensch and Jeff Perkell, were awarded grants from the JM Kaplan Foundation, and the New York State Council on the Arts, which enabled the completed project, "South Street Survey" to be shown at the Municipal Art Society in 1985.

During this time, Moore was also working on a series of photographs of grain elevators in Buffalo, New York with the assistance of a NYSCA individual grant. In Buffalo, Moore met a group of artists working with appropriated imagery, which inspired him to begin using mechanical and chemical processes to incorporate multiple negatives, paintings, drawings, and xeroxes into complex montage images outside of strict documentary practice. This method of recombination, in the era before Photoshop, created images of "convulsive beauty" and were the subject of Moore's first solo exhibition in New York at Lieberman and Saul Gallery in 1986, following his first solo show at Real Art Ways in Hartford, CT in 1985.

Moore continued this method of montaging imagery for the next 7 years, expanding his practice into experimental short films. During this time, Moore collaborated on short films with others including the artists Lee Breuer and David Byrne. His film "Nosferatu" 1989 was nationally broadcast on MTV and PBS's New Television series.

== Mid-career ==
=== 42nd Street ===
In 1995, Moore returned to his roots in documentary practice as the texture of New York's 42nd Street was rapidly changing. With all of the theaters between 7th and 8th avenues scheduled to be razed or refurbished, Moore sought permission to photograph the torn seats and faded fire curtains which told the stories of those spaces. In 1997, Moore showed these photographs at Yancey Richardson Gallery in New York. Despite his change of style, the work was well received; in a review for The New Yorker, Andrew Long noted, "The straight forward treatment is a departure for the photographer, who characteristically produces multi-image evocations of New York City. Nothing is lost however— his earlier poetic constructs now give way to broader arenas for the imagination to roam."

=== Cuba ===
Moore first traveled to Cuba in 1998 to photograph Havana's decaying theaters. The project soon expanded in scope to document the larger effects of Cuba's permanent Revolution, which were particularly apparent during the economic depression known as the "Período especial." Moore's large-scale color photographs of Havana reveal an elegant but crumbling metropolis of muted pastel interiors, courtyards, and scenes of daily life. Moore returned to photograph Cuba's architecture and environment over the next 14 years, in the process publishing two monographs Inside Havana (Chronicle Books, 2002) and Cuba (Damiani, 2012). Moore has said his work intends to show, "how contemporary history, and specifically cultures in transition, are expressed through architecture." The photographer Julius Shulman wrote of Inside Havana, "Exhibited throughout Moore's work is a genuine flavor of ‘presence'. He does not attempt to gloss over questionable conditions, nor does he try to contort reality. With tremendous sensitivity, Moore creates art statements of the architecture he shows us. His images are painterly and poetic." Moore's photographs from Cuba appeared as a cover story in the September 23, 2012 issue of The New York Times Magazine.

=== Russia ===
While working in Cuba, Moore became interested in the island nation's long relationship with Russia. This led him to photograph the architectural environments where Russian history and politics collide in unexpected ways. Between 2000 and 2004 Moore made 8 trips around Russia from St. Petersburg to the remotest parts of the country. The New Yorker wrote of the work, "in taking Russia–its contradictions and gorgeous ruins–at face value, he captures a country's diversity and history." For example, Moore photographed a "czarist church [that] was turned into a soap factory during the Soviet period, and now has been restored into a kind of youth center." Moore remarked, "For me these kinds of subjects present a cross section through time: they address Russia's complex past, as well as the larger compacting and collapsing processes of contemporary history." In 2004, Moore published the monograph Russia Beyond Utopia (Chronicle Books, 2004).

=== How to Draw a Bunny ===
From 1995 to 2001, Moore produced and photographed the film How to Draw a Bunny: A Ray Johnson Portrait, a collage-style feature-length documentary about the Detroit-born pop and performance artist Ray Johnson. Moore worked with the director and editor John Walter to delve into the mysterious life and death of Johnson, an artist whose "world was made up of amazing coincidences, serendipities and karmic gags," according to Michael Kimmelman of The New York Times. After Johnson's suicide, Moore and Walter conducted interviews with artists including Christo, Chuck Close, Roy Lichtenstein, Judith Malina, and James Rosenquist. In addition, they gathered photographs, works of art, and home movies, which were edited into a fast-paced narrative exploring the artist's life. The filmmakers "couldn't have chosen a more elusive subject for a movie; their success in evoking Johnson, and in documenting his world, is a triumph of sympathy over psychology, memory over historicism," wrote Stuart Klawans for The Nation. The film premiered at the 2002 Sundance Film Festival, where it won the Special Jury Prize. The film also won the Grand Prix du Public 2002 at the Rencontres Internationales de Cinema in Paris and was nominated for a 2003 Independent Spirit Award and listed in New York Magazine's "Top Ten of 2004."

=== Detroit ===
In 2008 and 2009, Moore traveled to Detroit to portray in photographs "the idea that in an urban setting you could also have a landscape happening, the forces of nature intersecting with American urbanism, the process of decline also intersecting with the revival of nature." In 2010, Moore released Detroit Disassembled (Damiani, 2010), with an introduction by Detroit-native and Poet Laureate Philip Levine, to coincide with an exhibition at the Akron Art Museum. He was originally invited to document the city by two young French photographers, Yves Marchand and Romain Meffre, who had been photographing Detroit's abandoned spaces since 2005. While Moore's Detroit series follows the themes of transformation and decaying space explored in previous bodies of work, his focus on the motor city generated controversy in the pages of The New Republic and the journal Guernica. The photographs were decried as "ruin porn," which Mike Rubin defined in The New York Times as "urban decay as empty cliché, smacking of voyeurism and exploitation." Curator Sarah Kennel writes in The Memory of Time, an exhibition catalog from the National Gallery of Art, that, "in Moore's photographs, ruination serves more explicitly as an allegory of modernity's failure." Other critics argue that whether or not Moore's Detroit photographs fit the category of "ruin porn" is a matter of academic debate. Joseph Stanhope Cialdella argues in the journal Environmental History that Moore's work instead conveys the "aesthetic of a postindustrial sublime" which "gives nature the authority to transform the image of Detroit into a novel, yet disturbing landscape that blurs the lines between wilderness and the city." Dora Apel writes in Beautiful Terrible Ruins that Moore's "pictures of Detroit tend to emphasize the relationship of nature and culture, with nature in the ascendancy." Apel ultimately argues that the "ruin porn" images and debate fail to focus on the political and economic policies that are the root causes of the ruins.

=== Dirt Meridian ===
From 2005 to 2014, Moore photographed the people and landscape of "great American Desert," which roughly includes the area west of the 100th meridian to the Rocky Mountains, from Texas north to Canada. The area is one of the most sparsely populated regions in the country, "where the daily reality is often defined by drought and hardship." To make many of the photographs, Moore collaborated with Doug Dean, the pilot of a single-engine aircraft, to create bird's-eye perspectives revealing the vastness of the land. Rather than flying high above the plains, Moore chose perspectives that have "the sense of being within the landscape rather than above it." For an essay accompanying Moore's photographs in The New York Times Magazine, Inara Verzemnieks wrote, "From above, the land is like one endless, unpunctuated idea — sand, tumbleweed, turkey, bunch stem, buffalo, meadow, cow, rick of hay, creek, sunflower, sand — and only rarely did a house or a windmill or a barn suddenly appear to suspend the sense of limitlessness." On the ground, Moore photographed the people who inhabit this unforgiving landscape and the evidence of their efforts, from active homesteads to abandoned schoolhouses. These photographs are published in Moore's newest monograph: Dirt Meridian (Damiani, 2015).

== Teaching ==
Since 2004, Moore has taught a graduate seminar in the MFA Photography, Video, and Related Media program at the School of Visual Arts in New York City. He lectured on photography at Princeton University from 2001 to 2010.

== Personal life ==
Moore lives in New York City with his wife, two daughters, and son.

== Publications ==
- Inside Havana. San Francisco: Chronicle, 2002. ISBN 9780811833431.
- Governors Island: Photographs By Lisa Kereszi & Andrew Moore. New York: Public Art Fund, 2004. ISBN 0960848835.
- Russia Beyond Utopia. San Francisco: Chronicle, 2005. ISBN 9780811843225.
- Cuba. Bologna, Italy: Damiani, 2012. ISBN 9788862082525.
- Detroit Disassembled. Bologna, Italy: Damiani, 2010. ISBN 9788862081184.
- Making History. Terre Haute, IN: Indiana State University, 2011.
- Dirt Meridian. Bologna, Italy: Damiani, 2015. ISBN 9788862084123.
- Blue Alabama. Bologna, Italy: Damiani, 2019. ISBN 9788862086547.

== Films ==
- Nosferatu (1991) – short film, scored by Eliot Sokolov; selected for MTV's Artbreaks series, and WGBH-TV's New Television
- Chiaroscuro (1994)
- La Dolce Vito: A Profile of the artist Vito Acconci (1995) – City Arts, Thirteen-WNET; about Vito Acconci
- Edison, The Wizard of Electricity (1995) – director of photography; directed by John Walter for American Experience series
- Director of Photography for Supermarket (1995) – directed by David Byrne
- Flight Sequence for Peter and Wendy (1996) – a Mabou Mines Production, directed by Lee Breuer
- How to Draw a Bunny (1996) – producer/director of photography

== Awards ==
- 1981 National Endowment for the Humanities, Youth Grant
- 1982 Finalist, Prix de Jeunes Photographes, Arles, France
- 1983 NYSCA, Sponsored Project
- 1984 NYSCA, Exhibition Grant
- 1985 The Kaplan Fund
- 1995 Black Maria Festival, Director's Citation Award
- 1996 Cissy Patterson Foundation Grant
- 1997 Judith Rothschild Foundation Grant
- 2002 Sundance Film Festival, Special Jury Prize
- 2011 Michigan Notable Books Selection
- 2014 John Simon Guggenheim Memorial Foundation Fellowship
