= The Perks of Being a Wallflower =

1998 novel by Stephen Chbosky

- Author: Stephen Chbosky
- Language: English
- Genre: Young adult
- Publisher: Pocket Books (original cover); MTV Books (movie cover version)
- Publication date: February 1, 1999
- Publication place: United States
- Media type: Print (Paperback) and Audiobook
- Pages: 256 (first edition paperback); 224 (regular edition paperback)
- ISBN: 0-671-02734-4
- OCLC: 40813072
- Dewey Decimal: 813/.54 21+++++
- LC Class: PS3553.H3469 P47 1999

The Perks of Being a Wallflower is a 1999 young adult novel by American author Stephen Chbosky. Set in the early 1990s, the novel follows Charlie, an introverted and observant teenager, through his freshman year of high school in a Pittsburgh suburb. The novel details Charlie's unconventional style of thinking as he navigates between the worlds of adolescence and adulthood, and attempts to deal with poignant questions spurred by his interactions with both his friends and family.

Chbosky took five years to develop and publish The Perks of Being a Wallflower, creating the characters and other aspects of the story from his own memories. The novel addresses sexuality, drug use, rape, and mental health. It also makes several references to other literary works, films, and pop culture such as To Kill a Mockingbird, This Side of Paradise, On the Road, The Catcher in the Rye, Hamlet and The Rocky Horror Picture Show. The book has been banned in some American schools for its content.

A film adaptation written and directed by Chbosky was released in 2012. The film boosted the novel's sales, and the book reached The New York Times Best Seller list.

== Plot ==
Throughout the 1991–1992 school year, Charlie, the fifteen-year-old (later sixteen-year-old) protagonist, begins writing letters about his own life to an unknown recipient addressed, "Dear Friend". In these letters, he discusses his freshman year of high school and his struggles with two traumatic experiences: the suicide of his only middle-school friend, Michael Dobson, and the death of his favorite aunt, Helen.

His caring English teacher, who encourages Charlie to call him Bill, notices Charlie's passion for reading and writing, and acts as a mentor by assigning him extracurricular books and reports. Although he is a wallflower, Charlie is befriended by two seniors: Patrick and Sam. Patrick is secretly dating Brad, a football player, and Sam is Patrick's stepsister. Charlie quickly develops a consuming crush on Sam and subsequently admits this to her. Sam reveals to Charlie that she was sexually abused as a child, and she kisses Charlie to ensure that his first kiss is from someone who truly loves him.

Charlie witnesses his sister's boyfriend hit her across the face, but she forbids him from telling their parents. He eventually mentions the occurrence to Bill, who tells Charlie's parents about it. Charlie's relationship with his sister rapidly deteriorates and she continues to see her boyfriend against her parents' wishes. Eventually, Charlie discovers that his sister is pregnant and agrees to bring her to an abortion clinic without telling anyone. His sister breaks up with her boyfriend, after which her relationship with Charlie begins to improve significantly.

Sam and Patrick introduce Charlie to their friends, who readily accept him despite the three-year age difference. Many of these older teenagers smoke cigarettes, drink heavily at parties, use marijuana, and experiment with other drugs. Charlie picks up smoking himself and joins the others in drinking and getting high, though more moderately than the seniors. In the latter third of the book, Charlie trips on LSD, which triggers a dissociative flashback involving Aunt Helen, who died in a car crash on her way to buy him a birthday gift. He ends up in the hospital after falling asleep in the snow. At a Rocky Horror Picture Show performance, Charlie is asked to fill in as Rocky when Sam's boyfriend, Craig, can't make it that night. His performance impresses one of the girls in the group, Mary Elizabeth, who asks him to a Sadie Hawkins dance, starting a desultory relationship between them. It ends abruptly during a game of truth or dare when Patrick dares Charlie to kiss "the prettiest girl in the room." Charlie kisses Sam, and Mary Elizabeth storms out in tears. Afterward, Patrick suggests that Charlie stay away from Sam for a while as she focuses on comforting Mary Elizabeth, and the rest of the friend group pulls away from him, too. Without his friends to distract him from his inner turmoil, Charlie's depression, self-doubt, and dissociative episodes worsen.

Patrick and Brad's relationship is discovered by Brad's abusive father, and Brad disappears from school for a few days. Upon returning, Brad is cold and mean toward Patrick, while Patrick attempts to reconnect with him. However, when Brad derogatorily attacks Patrick's sexuality in public, Patrick physically attacks Brad until other football players join in and gang up on Patrick. Charlie joins in the fight to defend Patrick, and breaks it up, regaining the respect of Sam and her friends. Patrick begins spending most of his time with Charlie; shortly after, Patrick impulsively kisses Charlie but quickly apologizes. Charlie is sympathetic because he recognizes that Patrick is still recovering from his romance with Brad. Soon Patrick sees Brad engaging sexually with a stranger in the park and Patrick is able to move on from the relationship.

As the school year ends, Charlie is anxious about losing his older friends – especially Sam, who has learned that her boyfriend cheated on her, and is leaving soon for a summer college-prep program. When Charlie helps her pack, they talk about his feelings for her; she is angry that he never acted on them. They begin to engage sexually, but Charlie suddenly grows inexplicably uncomfortable and stops Sam. That night he dreams about Aunt Helen touching his genitals when he was a young boy.

In an epilogue, Charlie is discovered by his parents in a catatonic state: He shows no sign of movement, despite being reluctantly slapped by his father. After being admitted to a psychiatric hospital, the catatonia gradually lessens, and with the help of a caring psychiatrist he begins to recall suppressed memories of the childhood sexual abuse. This revelation helps the reader understand Charlie's post-traumatic stress symptoms, conflicted feelings about sexual relations, and reluctance to assert himself.

Charlie eventually comes to terms with his past: "Even if we don't have the power to choose where we come from, we can still choose where we go from there." Charlie decides to participate in life, and his letter-writing ends.

== Background and writing ==
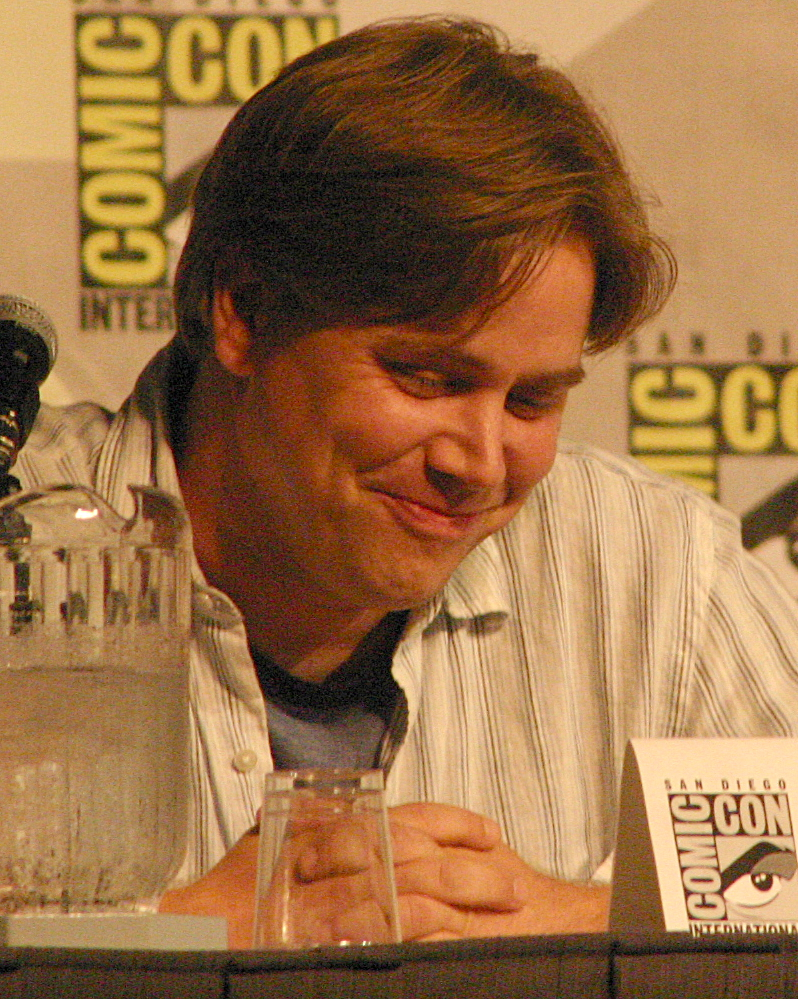
Author Stephen Chbosky at the 2006 San Diego Comic-Con

Chbosky incorporated both fictional ideas and personal experiences to the novel, making it semi-autobiographical. After five years with these elements in mind, he had the idea of writing the novel during a difficult period in his life. He was experiencing an unpleasant breakup of his own, which led him to ask "why good people let themselves get treated so badly?" The author tried to answer the question with the maxim "We accept the love we think we deserve". This quote references the struggle of finding self love, encompassing one's life and hope for the future – not just romantic love.

The story began when Chbosky was in school, evolving from another book on which he was working. In that book he wrote the sentence, "I guess that's just one of the perks of being a wallflower", which led him to realize "that somewhere in that ... was the kid I was really trying to find". Chbosky began writing the novel in the summer of 1996 while he was in college, and within ten weeks he completed the story. He rewrote it into two more drafts, concluding the published version in the summer of 1998.

Charlie was loosely based on Chbosky himself. In the novel, Chbosky included much of his own memories from the time he lived in Pittsburgh. The other characters were manifestations of people Chbosky had known throughout his life; Chbosky focused on people's struggles and what they are passionate about, attempting to pin down the very nature of each of the characters. The characters of Sam and Patrick were an "amalgamate and celebration" of several people Chbosky has met; Sam was based on girls who confided in him, and Patrick was "all the kids I knew who were gay and finding their way to their own identity".

== Style and themes ==
The idea of anonymous letters came from a real experience: During his senior year in high school, Chbosky wrote an anonymous letter to Stewart Stern about how Rebel Without a Cause had influenced him. A year and a half later, Stern found Chbosky and became his mentor. By using a series of letters from Charlie to an anonymous character, Chbosky found "the most intimate way" to talk directly to the reader. He thought the letters would help him keep the story cohesive, "to convey the highs and lows of being young – one day, you're on top of the world and you've had the greatest of times. Then, three weeks later, you’re terribly depressed".

Although read by all ages, The Perks of Being a Wallflower is intentionally targeted at a teenage audience. Critics have identified primary themes of teenage reality and nostalgia. According to David Edelstein of the New York magazine, Chbosky captures the "feeling you belong when among friends, yet you'd soon be alone" and notes that "the pain of loss ... [is] almost as intense as the bliss ... it's nostalgia with an emphasis on nostos, pain [sic] ". Marty Beckerman of Word Riot said that The Perks of Being a Wallflower connects with young people because its scenes are "so universal, and happen to so many teenagers". Chbosky wanted to convey respect for teenagers, to "validate and respect and celebrate what [teenagers] are going through every day," and said the novel is for "anyone who's felt like an outcast".

The book dispassionately addresses a range of themes, which include drugs, friendship, body image, first love, suicide, eating disorders and sexuality. Chbosky highlights the importance of entertainment in adolescence: "Books, songs, and movies are more than [just] entertainment when we're young: They help all of us discover who we are, what we believe, and what we hope our life can be". As such, the book contains several cultural references across all mediums: Musically, the book references The Smiths, Nirvana and Fleetwood Mac. The book makes literary references to This Side of Paradise, On the Road, Peter Pan, To Kill a Mockingbird, The Stranger and Walden. The book theatrically references Hamlet and The Rocky Horror Picture Show.

== Publication and reception ==
The Perks of Being a Wallflower was first published on February 1, 1999 by Pocket Books through its MTV Books imprint. It became the subsidiary's best-selling book with 100,000 copies in print as of 2000, and was included on school reading lists and gathered a cult following. By 2012, the novel had been published in 16 countries in 13 languages, and that same year it placed at number 16 on NPR's list of the "100 Best-Ever Teen Novels".

Critical response was mixed; Publishers Weekly called the novel "trite", dealing with "standard teenage issues" in which "Chbosky infuses a droning insistence on Charlie's supersensitive disposition". Although Kirkus Reviews said that it had "the right combination of realism and uplift", the reviewer criticized Chbosky's "rip-off" of J. D. Salinger's The Catcher in the Rye. Although other reviewers made similar comparisons, Chbosky said he "was not trying to mimic [Salinger's] style as a writer"; he saw "how readers could compare Charlie to [Salinger's] Holden Caulfield", but "they are very different people with unique problems and perspectives". More positive was Francisca Goldsmith of the School Library Journal, who said the novel "cleverly" makes the readers the recipients of Charlie's letters, and it "will engage teen readers for years to come". Common Sense Media's Kate Pavao praised its relevant themes for teenagers: "Readers will find themselves quickly feeling sorry for the protagonist and worrying about him throughout his transformative journey". For The A.V. Club, Marah Eakin wrote that, although for an adult "Perks suffers from an overabundance of pure, raw angst ... unlike some more arrested development-friendly young adult fare like Harry Potter, Perks speaks to a more specific age range and does it well".

=== Censorship in the United States ===
The Perks of Being a Wallflower has appeared eight times on the American Library Association's (ALA) list of 10 most frequently challenged books for its content: 2004 (5), 2006 (8), 2007 (10), 2008 (6), 2009 (3), 2013 (8), 2014 (8), 2022 (5), 2023 (4), and 2025 (2). Additionally, it was the tenth most banned and challenged book between 2000 and 2009 and the fourteenth most banned and challenged book between 2010 and 2019. Reasons for censorship include content considered to be anti-family, sexually explicit, and content involving homosexuality, offensive language, drugs and alcohol, nudity, descriptions of masturbation and suicide.

There have been multiple pushes in the US to move Perks to the adult section. Parents have raised issues with the novel for its "pornographic" content and "vulgarity", but others have argued that the book deals with real and common teen issues concerned with growing up, so it presents a truthful viewpoint. In 2013, the Glen Ellyn District 41 school board in suburban Chicago unanimously voted to reinstate the novel after it was removed from eighth-grade classrooms at Hadley Junior High School because of a parent's objection to its sexual content. In 2025, Utah banned the book from all public schools in the state.

I didn’t write it to be challenged. I didn’t write it to be a controversial book. I can’t really take it as a point of pride because it was banned someplace. The first time it happened, it was... well, exciting isn’t the right word, but I thought, 'Wow, it’s getting all this attention.' And I did think it was kind of exciting, that it was being talked about that way. But after a time, you start to realize that the argument is always the same. I no longer find the argument exciting, and it’s certainly not a matter of pride. It’s more of mourning the fact that people can’t agree to disagree, and people can’t find common ground. The people who object for moral reasons cannot see the value of the book, and the people who see the value of the book don’t realize why it’s upsetting to more religious people.

— Stephen Chbosky, Word Riot, 2011

Scholars and educators have stated that books like The Perks of Being a Wallflower hold imperative significance for young readers who see themselves reflected in the text. The American Library Association has documented that significant portions of the book discuss LGBTQ themes and the experience of minority communities, subjects that readers may benefit and learn from.

=== Censorship in Belarus ===
In April 2025, the Lukashenko regime added the book to its list of printed publications containing information messages and materials, the distribution of which could harm the national interests of Belarus.

== Film adaptation ==
Principal actors in the film adaptation
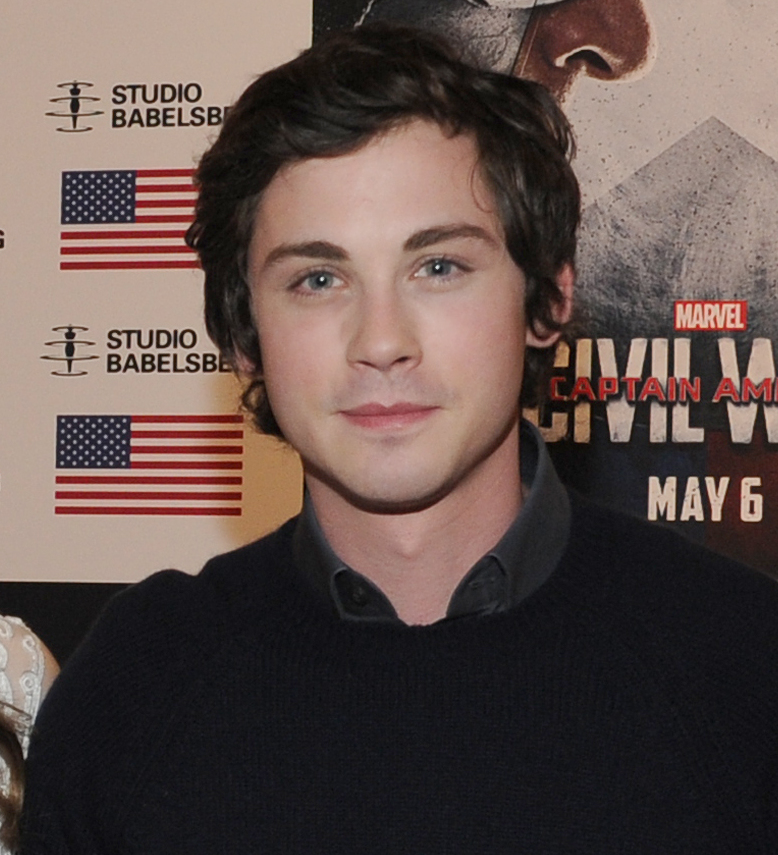
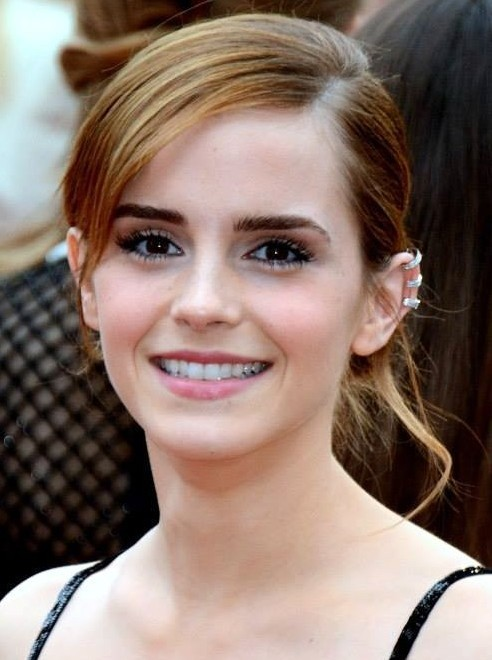
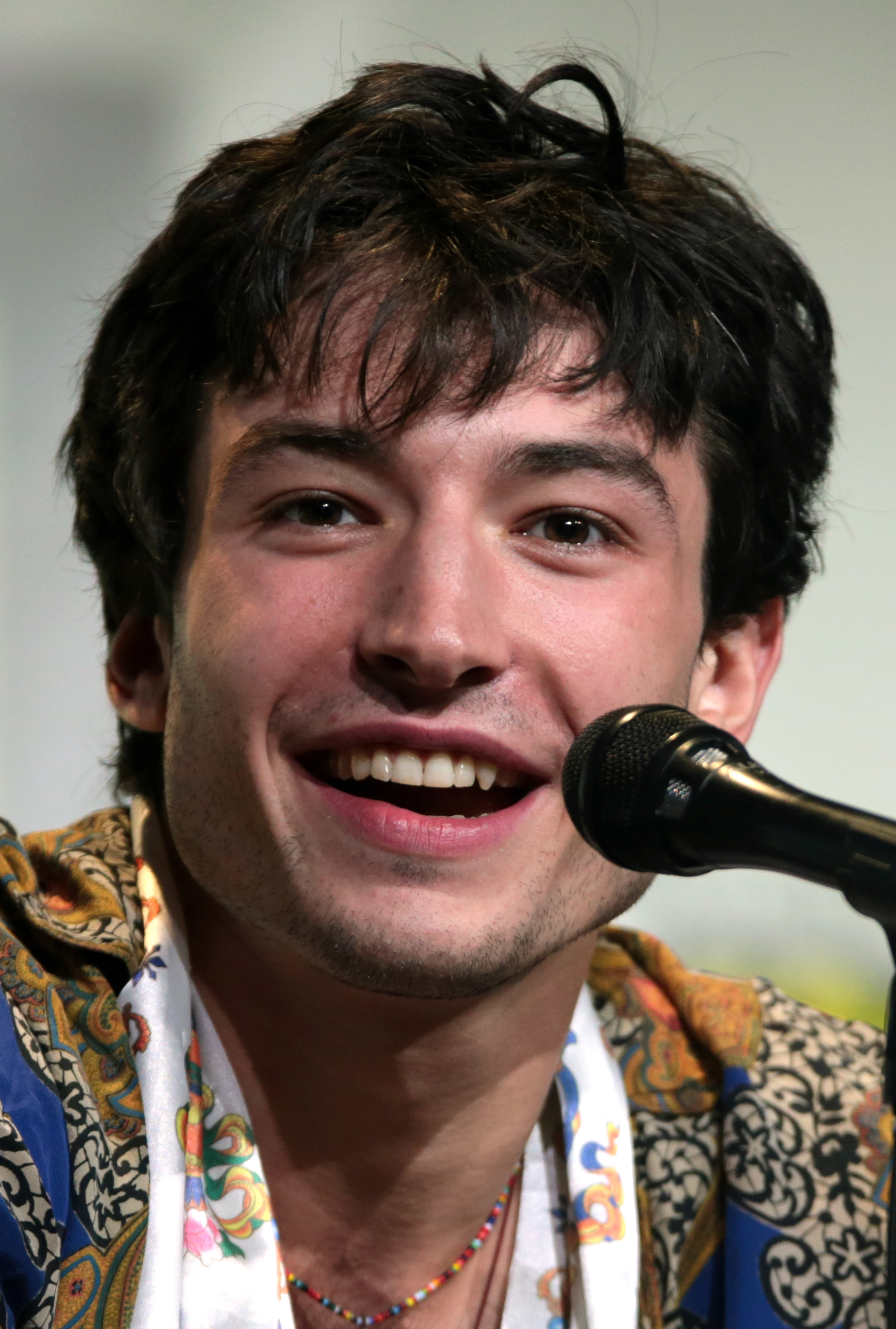
Lerman, Watson, and Miller, portrayed Charlie, Sam, and Patrick, respectively.

Since he wrote The Perks of Being a Wallflower, Chbosky aspired to adapt it into a film, calling this a "lifelong dream". After the publication of the novel, the author said he received film offers, refusing them because he "owed the fans a movie that was worthy of their love for the book". In 2010, Mr. Mudd began developing a film version, and the author was signed to write and direct the film by producers John Malkovich, Lianne Halfon and Russell Smith. The film, shot in the Pittsburgh area from May 9 to June 29, 2011, starred Logan Lerman as Charlie, Emma Watson as Sam, Ezra Miller as Patrick, and Nina Dobrev as Charlie's sister, Candace.

With the announcement of a film adaptation, the novel received more attention; its sales increased from 88,847 copies in 2011 to 425,933 in 2012, and it reached the New York Times bestseller lists. It entered the Children's Paperback Books category on the June 23, 2012 list, and had 1.5 million copies in print in November 2012. As of May 11, 2014 it appeared on The New York Times' top 10 list for the 71st non-consecutive week, and was in the top 15 on the November 23 list.

The film premiered on September 8, 2012 at the Toronto International Film Festival, and was released theatrically in the United States by Summit Entertainment on September 21. According to Metacritic, it has received "generally favorable reviews", with an average of 67 out of 100, based on 36 reviews. Rotten Tomatoes reported an 85% approval rate, based on 172 reviews. The film grossed over $33 million worldwide from a $13 million production budget.

There is a special features section on the DVD with scenes that were shot, but didn't make it into the film. Among the scenes that were omitted from the film adaptation: In the book, Charlie's parents are told by his mentor Bill that Candace is being abused by her boyfriend, to which, in the book, his parents take direct intervention in the abusive relationship; those events are not depicted by the film. Also omitted from the film is the side-story where Candace gets pregnant by her abusive boyfriend and is accompanied by Charlie to the abortion clinic. In addition, the poem presented in the book was filmed, but deleted from the theatrical cut.
