= Ransom Ashley =

American photographer and actor

- Born: Ransom Cade Ashley; 1992 (age 33–34); Shreveport, LA, U.S.
- Occupations: Actor, photographer
- Website: ransomashley.com

Ransom Ashley (born 1992) is an American photographer and actor. His photography is noted for its themes relating to identity and coming of age in Louisiana.

== Early life and education ==
Ransom Ashley was born and raised in Shreveport, LA, Ransom attended C. E. Byrd High School and Calvary Baptist Academy. After high school, Ashley went on to attend Parsons The New School for Design. He also attended Louisiana State University in Shreveport and is a member of the Psi Chi International Honor Society of Psychology.

== Career ==
=== Photography ===
Ashley has shown work in several international exhibitions. He has been featured in exhibitions at the New Britain Museum of American Art, Fort Wayne Museum of Art, and Masur Museum of Art, among others.

In 2013, Whitney Museum of Art curator, Elisabeth Sussman, chose his work for a juried exhibition in New York City. The Fort Wayne Museum of Art invited him to participate in their "The National: Best Contemporary Photography 2014" exhibition. In late 2014, Ashley was chosen by Gemma Padley of the British Journal of Photography as one of 20 artists to be part of an international exhibition at One Eyed Jacks in Brighton. Ashley draws most of his inspiration from films and music. Regarding his series "Virgins", Ashley was inspired by Richard Linklater films. According to Dazed and Teen Vogue, the photographer's work pays homage to his Louisiana roots and upbringing. His current project includes owning and operating marketing firm, Son of Rand and its online retail store Son of Rand Shop.

=== Acting ===
Ashley's first professional film credit was on Shark Night 3D where he worked as a stand-in/photo double. He later went on to star in his first film, Better Angels, directed by Clint McCommon. This gave way to more acting credits for Ashley, including a Louisiana Film Prize official selection, The Curators, where he portrays an ex high school baseball standout whose life has spiraled out of control. The Curators went on to receive distribution through ShortsHD and aired on ShortsTV as an Editors Pick. More recently, he was cast alongside Jonathan Bennett and Jordy Lucas in The Out and Out's, directed by Travis Champagne. He was also cast in I Saw the Light, the Hank Williams biopic starring Tom Hiddleston, and in Jackdaw, a Louisiana Film Prize Award Winning drama that MTV heralded an "ever-building slow burn". Ashley appeared as "Walker", the son of Holly Hunter's character, in the 2016 film Strange Weather.

== Personal and family life ==
Ashley comes from a family with a notable legal and political heritage. His great grandfather, Wellborn Jack Sr., was a distinguished member of the Louisiana House of Representatives and a respected attorney. His grandfather, Wellborn Jack Jr., furthered this legacy as a renowned trial lawyer. Wellborn Jr. was celebrated as one of America's top trial lawyers and presented the first successful defense based on Post-Traumatic Stress Disorder (PTSD), marking a significant milestone in legal history.

== Filmography ==
Year	Title	Role	Notes
2011	Shark Night 3D	Photo Double	
2012	Better Angels	Dewayne	
2013	The Curators	Jeremy Sims	
2014	The Out and Outs	Pa	
2015	I Saw the Light	Press Photographer	
2015	Jackdaw	Lawyer	
2016	Strange Weather	Walker	
2017	Sense of Urgency	Grayson	
