= A Good Baby =

1999 film by Katherine Dieckmann

- Theatrical poster
- Directed by: Katherine Dieckmann
- Written by: Leon Rooke; Katherine Dieckmann
- Produced by: Lianne Halfon; Tom Carouso; Aileen Argentini; Derrick Tseng
- Starring: Henry Thomas; David Strathairn; Cara Seymour
- Cinematography: Jim Denault
- Edited by: Katherine Dieckmann; Malcolm Jamieson
- Music by: David Mansfield
- Production companies: Good Baby; Kardana Films
- Distributed by: Curb Entertainment
- Release dates: April 1999 (LAIFF); December 1, 2000
- Running time: 87 minutes
- Country: United States
- Language: English

A Good Baby is a 1999 American drama film directed by Katherine Dieckmann, making her directorial debut. The film was produced by Lianne Halfon, Tom Carouso, Aileen Argentini and Derrick Tseng. The screenplay was written by Dieckmann and Leon Rooke. The film stars Henry Thomas as Raymond Toker, a young loner. Additional cast includes David Strathairn, Cara Seymour, Danny Nelson, Jayne Morgan, Allison Glenn, Jerry Foster, Jerry Rushing, Emilie Jacobs, and Hannah Grady.

== Plot ==
A young loner wandering the back roads of North Carolina comes across an abandoned baby. He immediately starts seeking the baby's parents, but starts developing a bond with the child as he explores his own isolated roots. In true bad guy fashion, a traveling salesman appears and truths about the baby's origin are slowly revealed.

== Release ==
The film premiered at the 1999 Los Angeles Independent Film Festival.
