= Richard L. Feigen =

American gallery owner (1930–2021)

- Born: August 8, 1930; Chicago, Illinois, U.S.
- Died: January 29, 2021 (aged 90); Mount Kisco, New York, U.S.
- Occupation: Gallerist
- Spouse: Sandra Elizabeth Canning Walker Margaret (Peggy) Langan-Culver Isabelle Harnoncourt Wisowaty

Richard Lee Feigen (August 8, 1930 – January 29, 2021) was an American art gallerist.

== Early life and education ==
A native of Chicago, he was the son of a lawyer and a homemaker who, while not themselves collectors, encouraged their son's early acquisitive interests. He purchased his first artwork in 1942, at the age of 11.

Feigen earned a Bachelor of Arts from Yale University in 1952 and a Master of Business Administration from Harvard University in 1954.

== Career ==
He opened his first gallery on Astor Street in Chicago in 1957, and displayed impressionist and surrealist artists from the 20th Century, such as George Grosz, Francis Bacon, Jean Dubuffet, Claes Oldenburg, Joseph Cornell, James Rosenquist, and Ray Johnson. He opened a second gallery in New York City in 1962 and displayed works from Vincent van Gogh, Claude Monet, Pablo Picasso, Max Beckmann, and Constantin Brâncuși. Throughout his career, Feigen sold paintings to the likes of the Louvre, the Metropolitan Museum of Art, the J. Paul Getty Museum, the Museum of Fine Arts, Boston, the National Gallery, and the National Gallery of Art.

Feigen was cast as a version of himself in Oliver Stone's 1987 film Wall Street.

== Personal life ==
He was married three times: to Sandra Elizabeth Canning Walker in 1966, to Margaret (Peggy) Langan-Culver in 1998, and to Isabelle Harnoncourt Wisowaty in 2007.

Feigen died from complications of COVID-19 in Mount Kisco, New York, on January 29, 2021, at the age of 90.

== Books ==
- Dubuffet and the Anticulture. Exh. cat. 1969–1970 New York.
- Tales from the Art Crypt: The Painters, the Museums, the Curators, the Collectors, the Auctions, the Art. New York: Knopf, 2000. ISBN 9780394571690

== Notable exhibitions in New York ==
- 1996: A Century of Landscape Painting, England and France 1770–1870
- 2004–2005: Beckmann/Picasso show with the Jan Krugier Gallery
- 2010: Richard Wilson and the British Arcadia
- 2011–2012: Late Medieval Panel Paintings
- 2015: Ray Johnson's Art World (estate of Ray Johnson, 1927–1995)
