= May Wilson =

American artist (1905–1986)

- Born: 1905; Baltimore, Maryland, U.S.
- Died: 1986 (aged 80–81)
- Occupation: artist

May Wilson (1905 – October 19, 1986) was an American artist and figure in the 1960s to 1990s New York City avant-garde art world. A pioneer of the feminist and mail art movement, she is best known for her Surrealist junk assemblages and her "Ridiculous Portrait" photocollages.

== Biography ==
Wilson was born in Baltimore, Maryland, into an underprivileged family. Her father died when she was young. She was reared by her Irish Catholic mother, who sewed piecework at home. Wilson left school after the ninth grade to become a stenographer/secretary to help support her family. When she turned 20, she married a young lawyer, William S. Wilson Jr., and gave birth to her first child. She continued to work until the birth of her second child, after which she devoted her energies primarily to mothering and homemaking. In 1942, the couple had prospered enough to move to Towson, Maryland, where she began to take correspondence courses in art and art history from several schools, including the University of Chicago. In 1948, after the marriage of their daughter, the couple moved to a gentleman's farm north of Towson, where she pursued painting and gave private art lessons to neighbors. She exhibited her paintings, scenes of everyday life painted in a flat, purposefully primitive manner in local galleries and restaurants. In 1952 and 1958, she won awards for work submitted to juried exhibitions at the Baltimore Museum of Art.

In 1956, her son, the writer Williams S. Wilson, gave to Ray Johnson, the founder of the New York Correspondence School, his mother's address. This began a friendship and artistic collaboration between Johnson and Wilson, which would last the remainder of her life. Wilson became an integral part of Johnson's mail art circle and was initiated into the New York avant-garde through letters and small works that she exchanged with Robert Watts, George Brecht, Ad Reinhardt, Leonard Cohen, Arman, and many others.

When her marriage dissolved, she moved to New York City in the spring of 1966, aged 61, taking up residence first in the Chelsea Hotel and then in a studio next door, where she threw legendary soirées and became known as the "Grandma Moses of the Underground". By the time she arrived, Wilson was already working with photomontage techniques. Encouraged by Johnson, who had sent her magazines through the mail, she scissored patterns into images of pin-up girls and muscle men until they resembled doilies or snowflakes, as Wilson called them. She decorated her hotel room and later her studio on West 23rd Street with these and other manipulated, found object images.

Around this time, she also began her series of "Ridiculous Portraits", for which she would ride the subway to Times Square, where she made exaggerated faces in photo booths. She then would cut and paste her photo-booth face onto postcards, along with Old Master reproductions, fashion shoots, and softcore magazine pornography. Long before artists such as Cindy Sherman and Yasumasa Morimura embarked on similar critical projects, Wilson's "Ridiculous Portraits" sent up the ubiquitous sexism and ageism that exists in popular and fine-art images of women.

At the age of 70, she converted a nude photograph of herself into a stamp that she pasted on envelopes. Her collages and humorous self-portraits were made as gifts and mail-art items for her friends and were not widely known until after her death. She was also an innovator of junk art assemblages that incorporated real objects, such as high-heel shoes, bed sheets, sauce pans, toasters, liquor bottles, ice trays, and wrapped baby dolls. Her sculptures were inspired by Surrealist and Dada practices and are similar in spirit to Yayoi Kusama's contemporary accumulations. Wilson was the subject of a 1969 experimental documentary by Amalie R. Rothschild, "Woo Who? May Wilson".

She died of pneumonia on Sunday, October 19, 1986, at the Village Nursing Home in Manhattan. She was survived by her children, William S. Wilson, III, and Mrs. Betty Jane Butler as well as six grandchildren, and a great-granddaughter.

Since her death, May Wilson's work has been featured in numerous exhibitions and retrospectives at the Baltimore Museum of Art, Maryland; Gracie Mansion Gallery, New York; the Morris Museum, Morristown, N.J.; the Pavel Zoubok Gallery, New York City; and The University of the Arts, Philadelphia.

== Selected exhibitions ==
- 2010 "Seductive Subversion: Women Pop Artists, 1958–1968", University of the Arts, Philadelphia (traveling exhibition)
- 2008 "1968/2008: The Culture of Collage", Pavel Zoubok Gallery, New York, City
- 2008 "Ridiculous Portrait: The Art of May Wilson", Morris Museum, Morristown, New Jersey
- 2008 "Woo Who? May Wilson", Pavel Zoubok Gallery, New York City
- 1995 [Retrospective], The Baltimore Museum of Art, Maryland
- 2001 "May Wilson: Ridiculous Portraits and Snowflakes", Gracie Mansion Gallery, New York, City
- 2001 "Inside Out: Outside In-The Correspondence of Ray Johnson and May Wilson", Sonoma Museum of Visual Art, California
- 1991 "May Wilson: The New York Years", Gracie Mansion Gallery, New York City
- 1973 "Sneakers", Kornblee Gallery, New York City
- 1973 "Small Works: Selections from the Richard Brown Baker Collection of Contemporary Art", RISD Museum, Providence, Rhode Island
- 1971 Corcoran Gallery of Art, Washington, D.C.
- 1970 "Sculpture Annual 1970", Whitney Museum of American Art, New York City
- 1965 The Baltimore Museum of Art, Baltimore, Maryland
- 1962 The Johns Hopkins University, Baltimore, Maryland
- 1957 Bookshop Gallery, Baltimore, Maryland

== Public collections ==
- Whitney Museum of American Art (New York City)
- The Baltimore Museum of Art (Baltimore, Maryland)
- Brooklyn Museum (Brooklyn, New York)

== Bibliography ==
- Aptaker, Ann. ed., Ridiculous Portrait: The Art of May Wilson [exhibition catalogue], Morristown, NJ: Morris Museum, 2008
- Camhi, Leslie, "Late Bloomer", Village Voice, December 18, 2001
- Giles, Gretchen, "Cosmic Litterers: Artists Ray Johnson and May Wilson: Taking the Cake", "Northern California Bohemian," June 14–20, 2001
- McCarthy, Gerard, "May Wilson: Homespun Rebel", Art in America, vol. 96, no. 8, September 2008, pp. 142–47
- Sachs, Sid and Kalliopi Minioudaki, Seductive Subversion: Women Pop Artists, 1958–1968. Philadelphia: The University of the Arts, 2010, ISBN 978-0789210654
- Wilson, William S. "Art is a Jealous Lover: May Wilson: 1905-1986", warholstars.org, November 18, 2001
- Wilson, William S. "Grandma Moses of the Underground", Art and Artists, London, May 1968
