= Ray Johnson =

American artist (1927–1995)

- Johnson circa 1968
- Born: Raymond Edward Johnson; October 16, 1927; Detroit, Michigan, U.S.
- Died: January 13, 1995 (aged 67); Sag Harbor, New York, U.S.
- Known for: Intermedia, conceptual art, collage
- Movement: Mail art, Fluxus, neo-Dada, pop art

Raymond Edward "Ray" Johnson (October 16, 1927 – January 13, 1995) was an American artist. Known primarily as a collagist and correspondence artist, he was a seminal figure in the history of Neo-Dada and early Pop art and was described as "New York's most famous unknown artist". Johnson also staged and participated in early performance art events as the founder of a far-ranging mail art network – the New York Correspondence School – which picked up momentum in the 1960s and is still active today. He is occasionally associated with members of the Fluxus movement but was never a member. He lived in New York City from 1949 to 1968, when he moved to a small town in Long Island and remained there until his suicide.

== Early years and education ==
Ray Johnson was born in Detroit, Michigan, on October 16, 1927, to Eino Johnson and Polkki Johnson. He grew up in a working-class neighborhood and attended Cass Technical High School where he was enrolled in the advertising art program. He took weekly classes at the Detroit Art Institute and spent a summer drawing at Ox-Bow School in Saugatuck, Michigan, affiliated with the Art Institute of Chicago.

Johnson left Detroit after high school in the summer of 1945 to attend the progressive Black Mountain College (BMC) in North Carolina, where he stayed for the next three years (spending the spring 1946 semester at the Art Students League in New York but returning the following summer). Josef Albers, before and after his notable sabbatical in Mexico, was in residence at Black Mountain College for six of the ten semesters that Johnson studied there. Anni Albers, Walter Gropius, Lyonel Feininger, Robert Motherwell, Ossip Zadkine, Paul Rand, Alvin Lustig, Ilya Bolotowsky, Jacob Lawrence, Beaumont Newhall, M. C. Richards, and Jean Varda also taught at BMC during Johnson's time there. Johnson decided on Albers' advice to stay at BMC for a final term in summer 1948, when the visiting faculty included John Cage, Merce Cunningham, Willem de Kooning, Buckminster Fuller, and Richard Lippold. Johnson took part in "The Ruse of Medusa" – the culmination of Cunningham's Satie Festival - with Cage, Cunningham, Fuller, Willem and Elaine de Kooning, Lippold, Ruth Asawa, Arthur Penn, and others among the cast and crew. "Because of those who participated, the event has taken on the reputation of a watershed event in 'mixed media'" wrote Martin Duberman in his history of BMC.

In the documentary How to Draw a Bunny, Richard Lippold confessed to carrying on a love affair with Johnson for several years.

I risk to say, [that at Black Mountain College] 'anything went'—between the students and the faculty ... he would arrive every morning with a little bouquet of wild flowers, and singing. Eventually our relationship became very intimate, so I brought him back to New York ... and obviously, we didn't live together, steadily, because I had my family. We were quite close together until 1974, so that's a long period of time. From '48 to '74, twenty some years. Because it was a very intimate relationship, a loving relationship.

== New York years ==
Johnson moved with Richard Lippold to New York City by early 1949, rejoining Cage and Cunningham and befriending, within the next couple of years, Robert Rauschenberg, Jasper Johns, Cy Twombly, Ad Reinhardt, Stan Vanderbeek, Norman Solomon, Lucy Lippard, Sonia Sekula, Carolyn Brown and Earle Brown, Judith Malina, Diane di Prima, Julian Beck, Remy Charlip, James Waring, and innumerable others. With the American Abstract Artists group, Johnson painted geometric abstractions that, in part, reflected the influence of Albers. But by 1953 he turned to collage and left the American Abstract Artists, rejecting his early paintings, which it is rumored that he later burned in Cy Twombly's fireplace. Johnson began to create small, irregularly shaped works incorporating fragments from popular culture, most notably the Lucky Strikes logo and images from fan magazines of such movie stars as Elvis Presley, James Dean, Marilyn Monroe, and Shirley Temple. In the summer of 1955, he coined a term for these small collages: "moticos". He carried boxes of moticos around New York, showing them on sidewalks, at cafes, in Grand Central Station and other public places; he asked passersby what they thought of them, and recorded some of their responses. He began mailing collages to friends and strangers, along with a series of manifestos, mimeographed for distribution, including "What is a Moticos?", excerpts of which were published in an article by John Wilcock in the inaugural issue of The Village Voice.

A friend of Johnson's, art critic Suzi Gablik, brought photographer Elisabeth Novick to document an installation of dozens of Johnson's moticos in autumn of 1955. (Most of these were destroyed or recycled by the artist.) "The random arrangement, on a dilapidated cellar door in Lower Manhattan may even have been the first informal Happening," she recalled later. According to Henry Geldzahler, "[Ray's] collages Elvis Presley No. 1 and James Dean stand as the Plymouth Rock of the Pop movement." Johnson's friend Lucy Lippard would later write that "The Elvis ... and Marilyn Monroe [collages], heralded Warholian Pop." Johnson was quickly recognized as part of the nascent Pop generation. A note about the cover image in January 1958's Art News pointed out that "[Jasper] Johns' first one-man show ... places him with such better-known colleagues as Rauschenberg, Twombly, Kaprow and Ray Johnson".

Johnson worked part-time at the Orientalia Bookstore on the Lower East Side as he began to deepen his understanding of Zen philosophy and to employ "chance" in his work. Both of these interests increasingly informed his collages, performances, and mail art. Johnson also found occasional work as a graphic designer. He had met Andy Warhol by 1956; both designed several book covers for New Directions and other publishers. Johnson had a series of whimsical flyers advertising his design services printed via offset lithography, and began mailing these out. These were joined in 1956–7 by two small promotional artists' books, BOO/K/OF/THE/MO/NTH and P/EEK/A/BOO/K/OFTHE/WEE/K, self-published in editions of 500.

Johnson participated in about a dozen performance art events between 1957 and 1963 – in his own short pieces (Funeral Music for Elvis Presley and Lecture on Modern Music), in those of others (by James Waring and Susan Kaufman), and via his own compositions performed by his colleagues at The Living Theatre and during the Fluxus Yam Festival of 1963. From 1961 on, Johnson periodically staged events he called "Nothings", described to his friend William Wilson as "an attitude as opposed to a happening", which would parallel the "Happenings" of Allan Kaprow and later Fluxus events. The first of these, "Nothing by Ray Johnson", was part of a weekly series of events in July 1961 at the AG Gallery, a venue in New York operated by George Maciunas and Almus Salcius; Yoko Ono's first solo show was on view in the gallery at the time. Ed Plunkett later recalled entering an empty room. "Visitors began to enter the premises. Most of them looked quite dismayed that nothing was going on ... Well, finally Ray arrived ... and he brought with him a large corrugated cardboard box of wooden spools. Soon after arriving Ray emptied this box of spools down the staircase ... with these ... one had to step cautiously to avoid slipping ... I was delighted with this gesture." Johnson's Second Nothing took place at Maidman Playhouse, New York, in 1962. It was part of a variety show that was organized by Nicholas Cernovich and Alan Marlow of New York Poet's Theatre, had lighting design by Billy Name (aka Billy Linich), and featured artists such as Fred Herko, George Brecht, Simone Morris, La Monte Young, Stan Vanderbeek, and others. In 1964/65, Ray Johnson circulated publicity for an imaginary gallery called the Robin Gallery, which was a pun on the Rueben Gallery where some of the earliest happenings took place and was said by one critic to “put the happenings out on the street in a series of irresponsible exploits and escapades."

Johnson's first known piece of mail directing a recipient to "please send to..." someone else dates from 1958; the phrases "please add to and return", "please add and send to", and even "please do not send to" followed. Johnson's mail art activities became more systematic with the help of several friends, particularly Bill Wilson and his mother, assemblage artist May Wilson, along with Marie Tavroges Stilkind and later Toby Spiselman. In 1962, Ed Plunkett named Johnson's endeavors 'the New York Correspondence School' (NYCS) – occasionally spelled 'Correspondance' by Johnson. In early 1962, Joseph Byrd responded to several mailings with a red rubber stamp, "THIS IS NOT ART," which Johnson then used in his mailings for several months. On April 1, 1968, the first of the meeting of the NYCS was held at the Society of Friends Meeting House on Rutherford Place in New York City. Two more meetings were called by Johnson in the following weeks, including the Seating-Meeting at New York's Finch College, about which John Gruen reported: "It was ... attended by many artists and 'members' ... all of whom sat around wondering when the meeting would start. It never did ... people wrote things on bits of paper, on a blackboard, or simply talked. It was all strangely meaningless – and strangely meaningful." Johnson staged such events regularly, often following them up with witty typed reports, photocopied for wide distribution via the post. Such gatherings continued to be held in various guises into the mid-1980s.

Johnson produced 13 known unbound pages of his enigmatic A Book About Death from 1963 to 1965. Consisting of cryptic texts and drawings (mostly) by Johnson, they were mailed a few at a time, randomly, and offered for sale via a classified ad in The Village Voice., thus very few people ever received all the pages. Something Else Press published Johnson's The Paper Snake for a wider audience in 1965. Remarking about himself and the book, Johnson said:

I'm an artist and a, well, I shouldn't call myself a poet but other people have. What I do is classify the words as poetry. ... The Paper Snake ... is all my writings, rubbings, plays, things that I had given to the publisher, Dick Higgins, editor and publisher, which I mailed to him or brought to him in cardboard boxes or shoved under his door, or left in his sink, or whatever, over a period of years. He saved all these things, designed and published a book, and I simply as an artist did what I did without classification. So when the book appeared the book stated, "Ray Johnson is a poet", but I never said, "this is a poem", I simply wrote what I wrote and it later became classified.

Long out of print, The Paper Snake was re-printed by Siglio Press in 2014.

On June 3, 1968 – the same day that Andy Warhol was shot by Valerie Solanas with a gun she'd stored under May Wilson's bed – Johnson was mugged at knifepoint. Two days later, Robert Kennedy was assassinated. Severely shaken, Johnson moved to Glen Cove, Long Island, and the next year bought a house in nearby Locust Valley, where Richard Lippold and his family resided. He began to live in a state of increasing reclusion in what he called a "small white farmhouse with a Joseph Cornell attic."

Johnson appeared twice in the Art in Process series, described by blogger Greg Allen as "a series of topical, process-oriented, teaching exhibitions organized by Finch College Museum director Elayne Varian. They included sketches, models and studies to show how the artist did what he was doing."

== Locust Valley years ==
Untitled (Seven Black Feet with Eyelashes), by Ray Johnson, 1982–1991, Honolulu Museum of Art

From 1966 into the mid-1970s, Johnson's work was shown at the Willard Gallery (New York) and Feigen Gallery (Chicago and New York), as well as by Angela Flowers in London and Arturo Schwarz in Milan. In 1970, mail from 107 participants to curator Marcia Tucker was exhibited in a Ray Johnson – New York Correspondence School exhibition at the Whitney Museum of American Art, New York – a significant moment of cultural validation for Johnson. Another notable exhibition followed – Correspondence: An Exhibition of the Letters of Ray Johnson at the North Carolina Museum of Art in Raleigh, 1976, organized by Richard Craven: 81 lenders' works, 35 years of Johnson's outgoing mail. Around that time, Johnson began his silhouette project, creating approximately 200 profiles of personal friends, artists, and celebrities which became the basis for many of his later collages. His subjects included Chuck Close, Andy Warhol, William S. Burroughs, Edward Albee, Louise Nevelson, Larry Rivers, Lynda Benglis, Nam Jume Paik, David Hockney, David Bowie, Christo, Peter Hujar, Roy Lichtenstein, Paloma Picasso, James Rosenquist, Richard Feigen, among others – a who's who of the New York arts and letters scene.

During the 1980s Johnson purposefully receded from view, cultivating his role as outsider, maintaining personal connections via mail art and telephone largely in place of physical interaction. In 1981, he began a longstanding correspondence with librarian and artists' book specialist, Clive Phillpot. Only a handful of people were ever allowed into his house in Locust Valley. Eventually, Johnson ceased to exhibit or sell his work commercially altogether. His underground reputation bubbled beneath the surface into the 1980s and 90s despite his general absence from the flourishing New York art scene. Johnson feverishly continued to work on richer and more complex collages, such as Untitled (Seven Black Feet with Eyelashes), in the collection of the Honolulu Museum of Art. It demonstrates the artist's incorporation of text into collage, which is his preferred medium. In contrast to his physical seclusion, Johnson's pre-digital network of correspondents increased in size exponentially.

== Death ==
On January 13, 1995, Johnson was seen diving off a bridge in Sag Harbor, Long Island, and backstroking out to sea. His body washed up on the beach the following day. Many aspects of his death involved the number "13": the date; his age, 67 (6+7=13); the room number of a motel he had checked into earlier that day, 247 (2+4+7=13), etc., although some are purely coincidence. For instance, it was later discovered that Room 247 was the only available room in the motel on that day. Some continue to speculate about a 'last performance' aspect of Johnson's drowning. Hundreds of collages were found carefully arranged in his home. He left no will and his estate is now administered by fine art dealership Adler Beatty.

== Film, television and music ==
Over seven hours of videos with Ray were created by Nicholas Maravell in the late 1980s. Ray greatly enjoyed the creative process of making them and liked viewing them. Ray had wanted the videos to be played at his final scheduled gallery exhibition but at the last minute he had reason to cancel that show and he asked that the videos not be shown. These wishes were honored after Ray's death even when the gallery owner tried repeatedly to have Maravell show them. Portions of the videos have been used by several filmmakers. A Sampler of them played at Ray's Whitney Museum retrospective after Ray's death. Robert Rodger created a website to honor and help share these videos.

Following his suicide, filmmakers Andrew Moore and John Walter (in conjunction with Frances Beatty of Richard L. Feigen & Co.) spent six years probing the mysteries of Johnson's life and art. Their collaboration yielded the award-winning documentary How to Draw a Bunny, released in 2002. The film includes interviews with artists Chuck Close, James Rosenquist, Billy Name, Christo and Jeanne-Claude, Judith Malina, and many others.

The Manic Street Preachers wrote and recorded a song about Johnson, titled "Locust Valley." Released as a B-side on the "Found That Soul" single (2001), "Locust Valley" describes Johnson as "famously unknown/elusive and dismantled".

John Cale's song "Hey Ray" from the Extra Playful EP (2011) is about Cale's encounters with Johnson in New York during the 1960s.

Canadian art rock band Women's 2010 album Public Strain includes two songs that directly reference Ray Johnson. Locust Valley is the town where Johnson lived in New York State. Venice Lockjaw is a phrase Johnson incorporated in pins that he made to be given away at the Ubi Fluxus ibi Motus exhibit in 1990 at the Venice Biennale. Their 2008 album Women also featured a song called Sag Harbor Bridge, referencing the place of Johnson's death.

== Exhibition history ==
Posthumous exhibitions
Name	Duration	Location	Solo/Group
Ray Johnson. Please Add to and Return	2009	Ravens Row	Solo
Ray Johnson and Friends	2014	Printed Matter	Group
Ray Johnson Designs	2014	The Museum of Modern Art	Solo
PLEASE RETURN TO - Mail Art From the Ray Johnson Archive	2015	Richard L. Feigen and Company	Solo
Pushing the Envelope	2018–2019	Archives of American Art	Group
Ray Johnson: What A Dump	2021	David Zwerner Gallery	Solo
Ray Johnson c/o	2021–2022	The Art Institute of Chicago	Solo
PLEASE SEND TO REAL LIFE: Ray Johnson Photographs	2022	The Morgan Library and Museum	Solo
Ray Johnson: Paintings and Collages 1950-66	2024	Craig Starr Gallery	Solo
Ray Johnson	2024	Blum Gallery	Solo

A temporary exhibition of Ray Johnson's work opened in 2021 at The Art Institute of Chicago, entitled Ray Johnson c/o. The exhibition showed the relationship of Ray Johnson's work to mail art, and the spirit of collaboration and connection that influenced the dispersal of much of his work. Utilizing collection donated to The Art Institute of Chicago by Bill Wilson, a lifelong friend of Johnson's. The exhibition showcased the largest collection of Ray Johnson's work on public display since the artists death. Items on display included the artists popular series of small cardboard collages called 'moticos,' as well as some of the artists earlier work during his time at Black Mountain College.
