= Diggers (2006 film) =

- Promotional poster
- Directed by: Katherine Dieckmann
- Written by: Ken Marino
- Produced by: Mark Cuban; Todd Wagner; David Wain
- Starring: Paul Rudd; Lauren Ambrose; Ron Eldard; Josh Hamilton; Ken Marino; Sarah Paulson; Maura Tierney
- Cinematography: Michael McDonough
- Edited by: Sabine Hoffmann; Malcolm Jamieson
- Music by: David Mansfield
- Distributed by: Magnolia Pictures
- Release dates: September 9, 2006 (TIFF); April 2007
- Running time: 87 minutes
- Country: United States
- Language: English

Diggers is an American film directed by Katherine Dieckmann. It portrays four working-class friends who work as clam diggers in West Islip, on the South Shore of Long Island, New York, in 1976.

The movie was written by Ken Marino, who also stars. His father worked as a clam digger, in Moriches, New York.

== Plot ==
Four working-class friends work on Long Island, New York, as clam diggers. Their fathers were clam diggers as well as their grandfathers before them. They must learn to face the changing times in both their personal and professional lives.

== Cast ==
- Paul Rudd as Hunt
- Lauren Ambrose as Zoey
- Ron Eldard as Jack
- Josh Hamilton as Cons
- Ken Marino as Lozo
- Sarah Paulson as Julie
- Maura Tierney as Gina
- Beeson Carroll as Hunt's Father

== Production ==
Diggers was filmed over a period of 21 days, mostly in Tottenville, Staten Island. The budget was $1.5 million. David Wain was originally set to direct the film. Marino wrote the screenplay with Rudd in mind as the lead character. Dieckmann shot the photographs used by Rudd's character.

== Release ==
Diggers was released on April 27, 2007, and premiered on HDNet on April 27, and was released on DVD on May 1.

== Critical reception ==
The Boston Globe called the film "a tragicomedy of entropy, a film that wonders what happens to men when they can't do the only thing they know how to." The Washington Post opined that it "never quite breaks out of its talky inertia." The Village Voice concluded that "the movie belongs to Ken Marino, who is riotously funny as the family man whose anger-management problem at last finds a fitting target in the big businessmen who come to destroy his living."

The New York Times wrote: "It also demonstrates that a solid formula, no matter how frequently followed, can be refreshed if it is handled with affectionate care. From I Vitelloni to Diner to The Groomsmen, a group of aging boys clinging together as the scary future threatens their solidarity is a natural movie subject. And Diggers works that formula with such confidence and knowledge of its particular environment that you hardly notice the craft behind it."
