= Demolition (2015 film) =

2015 film by Jean-Marc Vallée

- Theatrical release poster
- Directed by: Jean-Marc Vallée
- Written by: Bryan Sipe
- Produced by: Lianne Halfon; Russ Smith; Molly Smith; Trent Luckinbill; Sidney Kimmel; Jean-Marc Vallée
- Starring: Jake Gyllenhaal; Naomi Watts; Chris Cooper; Judah Lewis
- Cinematography: Yves Bélanger
- Edited by: Jay M. Glen
- Production companies: Black Label Media; SKE; Mr. Mudd
- Distributed by: Fox Searchlight Pictures
- Release dates: September 10, 2015 (TIFF); April 8, 2016 (United States)
- Running time: 101 minutes
- Country: United States
- Language: English
- Budget: $10 million
- Box office: $4.2 million

Demolition is a 2015 American comedy-drama film directed by Jean-Marc Vallée and written by Bryan Sipe. The film stars Jake Gyllenhaal, Naomi Watts, Chris Cooper, and Judah Lewis. The film opened the 2015 Toronto International Film Festival and was theatrically released on April 8, 2016, by Fox Searchlight Pictures.

== Plot ==
Davis Mitchell is a successful private equity investor at a firm founded and run by his father-in-law, Phil. His wife, Julia, is driving them when they are struck by another vehicle, killing Julia. Recovering in the hospital, he attempts to purchase some candy from a vending machine which malfunctions. Davis drafts a complaint to the vending machine manufacturer that includes some venting of his personal experiences. This leads to a series of conversations with a customer service representative, Karen Moreno, in which they end up sharing details of each other's life burdens. Karen appears to be the only one he talks to, though he tells his stories in an understated and unemotional style. He brings this same unemotional process to work, which he has returned to much earlier than anyone expected. Davis does tell one other person, a fellow commuter train rider, that he thinks that he did not love Julia because he does not feel "...sad, or pain, or hurt...". When the commuter prompts the question, "What do you feel?" Davis abruptly stops the train by pulling the emergency brake.

Davis' changing emotional state causes him to behave erratically. He notices that he is being followed by a brown station wagon. The only thing Davis seems to connect with is trying to understand what is inside things, using a small toolkit to dismantle his household appliances, his work computer, a bathroom stall—eventually telling Phil that he has an urge to dismantle a 120-year-old grandmother clock in Phil's office.

Karen follows Davis, talking with him on his commuter train without revealing her identity. She mistakenly leaves some identification, and Davis is sufficiently moved to track her down at home, where she lives with her boyfriend and boss, Carl, and her 15-year old troublemaker son, Chris. When Carl goes on a long business trip, Davis bunks at her house, where they develop a deep platonic friendship. Chris initially dislikes Davis, but later grows not only to like him but to help Davis cope, while Davis becomes his mentor in return.

Davis joins his in-laws in funding a foundation in Julia's name that will award an annual scholarship; during interviews, Davis behaves disrespectfully towards one of the award candidates, and Phil asks him to sign a transfer of his beneficiary rights in Julia's $2.6 million life insurance policy to the scholarship fund in her name. Davis purchases demolition tools from a hardware store (and, later, a bulldozer) and, with Chris' assistance, destroys his house. When Davis finds an ultrasound of Julia's from the previous year, he is devastated that she failed to inform him.

A climactic night impacts everyone. Davis brings Karen to the party for the scholarship winner, greatly troubling Julia's parents. A young man makes an inappropriate advance on Karen, and she later laughs out loud when he is introduced as one of the scholarship winners. Davis announces to everyone that Julia had been pregnant and kept it secret. Julia's mother tells him his wife was seeing someone else, the child was not his, and she had an abortion. Returning to Karen's house, Davis finds Carl has returned and is reading the letters Davis wrote to Karen. Carl assaults Davis, while Chris receives a brutal group beating after coming out as gay.

Davis visits his wife's grave and the green station wagon arrives; a man carrying flowers gets out of the car. He turns out to be Michael, the driver of the car that killed Julia. Davis forgives Michael and he experiences flashbacks of his wife and him together and he finally cries, bringing closure. He reconciles with Julia's parents, asking Phil to contribute to refurbishing a carousel – destined for demolition – as a memorial for Julia.

Davis receives a letter from Chris saying that he is recovering from his beating, his mother has left Carl, and Davis must be at Pier 54 at a particular time, which results in Davis witnessing the demolition of some waterfront buildings across the Hudson River. Chris watches Davis through binoculars from a nearby vantage point. In the final scene, Davis joyously joins a bunch of kids running as he races ahead accomplishing his childhood memory and desire for winning a race since he always used to lag behind.

== Cast ==
- Jake Gyllenhaal as Davis Mitchell, an investment banker
- Naomi Watts as Karen Moreno, a customer service representative
- Chris Cooper as Phil Eastwood, Davis' father in-law
- Judah Lewis as Chris Moreno, Karen's son
- C.J. Wilson as Carl
- Polly Draper as Margot Eastwood
- Malachy Cleary as Davis' father
- Debra Monk as Davis' mother
- Heather Lind as Julia, Davis' wife
- Alfredo Narciso as Michael (owner of green car)
- Mark Lewis as Doctor of Chris Moreno

== Production ==
In May 2013, director Jean-Marc Vallée was set to direct Demolition, for a 2015 release date. On October 9, 2013, it was announced that Black Label Media would finance the film, and would co-produce along with Mr. Mudd. On June 6, 2014, Jake Gyllenhaal was in early talks to star in the film. On July 21, Naomi Watts was in talks to join the film. On September 4, Watts was confirmed cast in the film to play the female lead. On September 10, Chris Cooper was set to star in the film. On October 18, The Hollywood Reporter announced that Fox Searchlight Pictures had acquired U.S., U.K., Australian, French and German rights to the film, and director Vallée said, "I'm thrilled and excited to be back in business with Fox Searchlight. They have been wonderful, creative partners on Wild. I look forward to collaborating again on Demolition." Judah Lewis' role as the son of Watts' character Karen Moreno was confirmed on July 15, 2015. Filming began on September 15, 2014, in New York City.

== Release ==
On July 15, 2015, Fox Searchlight Pictures set the film for a wide release on April 8, 2016.

=== Home media ===
The film was released on Digital HD on April 8, 2016, on the same date when it came out in theatres. It was released on DVD and Blu-ray on July 19, 2016.

== Reception ==
=== Box office ===
In the United States and Canada, pre-release tracking suggested the film would gross $2–3 million from 854 theaters in its opening weekend, trailing fellow newcomers The Boss ($20–24 million projection) and Hardcore Henry ($7–10 million projection). It ended up grossing just $1.1 million in its opening weekend, finishing 15th at the box office.

=== Critical response ===
Demolition received mixed reviews from critics. On Rotten Tomatoes, the film has a 54% approval rating based on 210 reviews, with an average rating of 5.8/10. The site's consensus reads, "Demolition benefits from a stellar cast, even if their solid work isn't always enough to prop up a confused story that aims for profundity but too often settles for clichés." On Metacritic, the film has a score of 49 out of 100, based on 42 critics, indicating "mixed or average" reviews.
