= Clive Phillpot =

British librarian

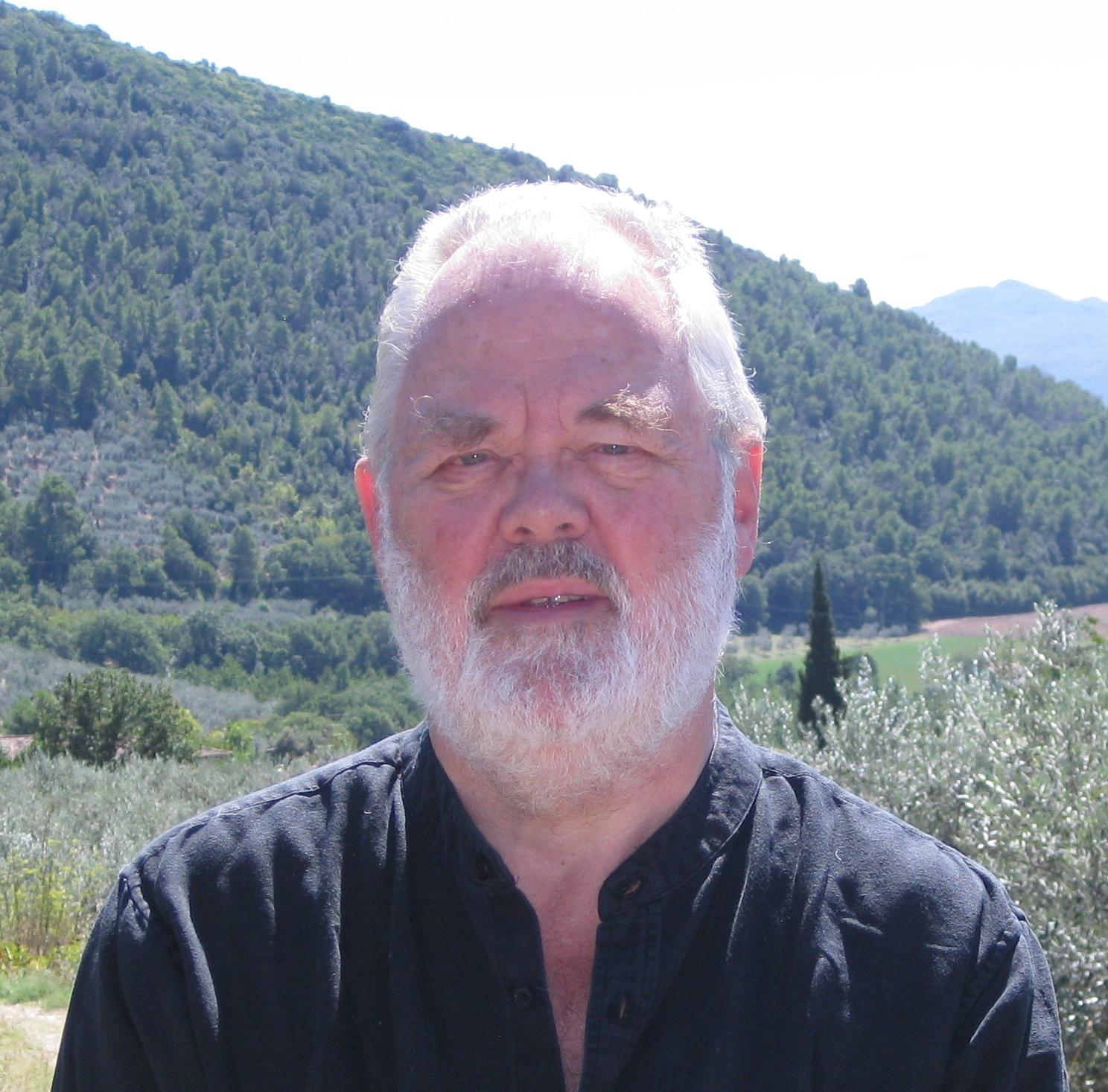
- Born: 1938 (age 86–87); Thorton Health, Surrey, England
- Occupation: Archivist

Clive Phillpot (Born 1938) is a specialist on artists' books, essayist, art writer, curator, and a librarian. Phillpot started his library career at the Charing Cross Public Library in London.

== Career ==
He is a former librarian at the Chelsea School of Art in London, and served as the Director of the Library at the Museum of Modern Art in New York from 1977 to 1994. After his departure from the Library at the Museum of Modern Art, Phillpot pursued freelance work, writing, and curating exhibitions. While serving as the head of the MoMA's library, Phillpot founded and curated the Artist Book Collection, established in 1977. Phillpot was an active supporter of the New York art world during the 1980s. He contributed to artist exhibition catalogues (including the catalogue for The Art Press, an exhibition on the history of art magazines), conducted artist interviews, wrote essays on artists, and contributed a column titled Feedback to the art magazine Studio International. In 2013, JRP-Ringier published a collection of Clive Phillpot's essays and interviews, titled Booktrek: Selected Essays on Artists' Books (1972-2010). Phillpot served on the boards of Center for Book Arts, Franklin Furnace Archive, and the New York State Council on the Arts. From 1980-1994, Clive Phillpot served as a Board Member for Printed Matter, and served as the president of Printed Matter from 1992-1993.

Clive Phillpot defines artists' books as a "book of which an artist is the author" in an issue of Art Documentation. Phillpot recognizes the fluidity of artists' books, and later defines them as "books or booklets produced by the artist using mass-production methods, and in (theoretically) unlimited numbers, in which the artist documents or realizes art ideas or artworks." On the discovery of artists' books, Phillpot philosophizes on the nature of experiencing art in unknown outlets: "What can be so beautiful, at a time when things are changing, is that one cannot fully understand what one has in one's hands, or what indeed is happening more generally. To lose that confusion later is almost sad."

== Art library work ==
In 1989, Clive Phillpot served as the president of the Art Library Societies of North America. Phillpot serves on the editorial board of Art Documentation, a peer-reviewed journal by the Art Libraries Society of North America (ARLIS/NA) and the University of Chicago Press. In an article titled "The Social Role of the Art Library" published by Art Documentation in 1983, Clive Phillpot outlines his philosophical perspective on the social roles of the art library in contrast to the research-based exclusionary barrier of art libraries. Phillpot assesses the art library as an institution benefitting the public in terms of open accessibility to the public, encouragement of visual inspiration, and advocacy for visual nourishment and education.

== Artist book collection ==
The Artist Book Collection at the Museum of Modern Arts exists as a unique and expansive collection on the history and medium of artist books and associated ephemera. Upon Phillpot's initiation, the Artist Book Collection criteria included off-set printed books and paperback books with mixed visual and verbal content in open editions. In terms of acquisition, Phillpot would regularly source materials from the artist book store Printed Matter, Inc founded by Lucy Lippard and Sol LeWitt in 1976. Additionally, Phillpot attributes acquisitions of artists' books to the New York Book Fair, specialist booksellers, and bookstores during the 1980s. Phillpot also maintained open correspondences and direct interactions with artists and publishers to acquire work for the collection.

== Curation ==
In 2009, Clive Phillpot was part of a group of curators that organized VOIDS: A Retrospective at the Pompidou Center in Paris, France. Other curators of the exhibition included Mai-Thu Perret, John Armleder, Gustav Metzger, Mathieu Copeland, Laurent Le Ben, and Philippe Pirotte. VOIDS: A Retrospective included monumental conceptualist and neo-conceptualist works on emptiness in nine empty gallery spaces, including Void by Yves Klein, The Air Conditioning Show by Art & Language, Haus Esters Piece by Bethan Huws, and Maria Eichorn’s Money, and projects by Laurie Parsons, Robert Barry, Roman Ondák, Robert Irwin, and Stanley Brouwn.

== Ray Johnson scholarly research ==
Clive Phillpot is considered to be a leading scholar on the work of mail artist and collagist, Ray Johnson. Starting in 1981, Ray Johnson began his mail art correspondences with Clive Phillpot, sending illustrations, collages, and letters. Ray Johnson and Clive Phillpot's correspondences began in 1981 irregularly, and remaining consistent from 1989-1994. In 2008, Clive Phillpot published a book titled Ray Johnson on Flop Art: Fragments from Conversations... on Fermley Press. On the nature of Johnson's work, Phillpot stated during an interview, "[m]y take on Ray’s mail art, as well as his reliefs and drawings, is not so much to find them addressing the present but rather that something from the past occasionally detonates into my present—in particular, having a penny drop for me after so many years have passed or belatedly realizing the significance of a detail I missed at the time."
