= The Perks of Being a Wallflower (film) =

2012 film by Stephen Chbosky

- Theatrical release poster
- Directed by: Stephen Chbosky
- Screenplay by: Stephen Chbosky
- Based on: The Perks of Being a Wallflower by Stephen Chbosky
- Produced by: Lianne Halfon; Russell Smith; John Malkovich
- Starring: Logan Lerman; Emma Watson; Ezra Miller; Mae Whitman; Kate Walsh; Dylan McDermott; Joan Cusack; Paul Rudd
- Cinematography: Andrew Dunn
- Edited by: Mary Jo Markey
- Music by: Michael Brook
- Production company: Mr. Mudd Productions
- Distributed by: Summit Entertainment (through Lionsgate)
- Release dates: September 8, 2012 (TIFF); September 21, 2012 (United States)
- Running time: 103 minutes
- Country: United States
- Language: English
- Budget: $13 million
- Box office: $33.3 million

The Perks of Being a Wallflower is a 2012 American coming-of-age romantic drama film written and directed by Stephen Chbosky, and based on his 1999 novel. Logan Lerman stars as a teenager named Charlie who writes to an unnamed friend, and these epistles chronicle his trials, tribulations, and triumphs as he goes through his freshman year of high school. The film depicts his struggles with his, unbeknownst to him, post-traumatic stress disorder, as he goes through his journey in high school making new friends, portrayed by Emma Watson and Ezra Miller. The film's ensemble cast also includes Mae Whitman, Kate Walsh, Dylan McDermott, Joan Cusack, Nina Dobrev, and Paul Rudd in supporting roles.

Chbosky had always intended to adapt the novel to film, but did not rush to do so. He was hesitant to sell the rights to the film to anyone, but eventually sold them to Mr. Mudd Productions as long as they let him write and direct the film. Principal photography began in Pittsburgh, Pennsylvania, in May 2011 and lasted approximately fifty days.

The Perks of Being a Wallflower had its world premiere at the 2012 Toronto International Film Festival on September 8, 2012, to a standing ovation. It was released theatrically in the United States on September 21, 2012, by Summit Entertainment. The film was well received by critics, who praised Chbosky's screenplay and direction, the performances of Lerman, Watson and Miller, soundtrack, execution of its topics, and emotional weight. It was also a box office success, grossing $33.3 million on a budget of $13 million, and received several accolades, including the Independent Spirit Award for Best First Feature, two Critics' Choice Movie Awards nominations, and the GLAAD Media Award for Outstanding Film – Wide Release. The film has since become a cult classic, especially among Zillennials, and helped define the "Tumblr era" in the early 2010s.

== Plot ==
In 1991, Charlie, who has suffered from clinical depression since childhood, has been discharged from a psychiatric hospital. Uneasy about beginning his freshman year of high school, he is painfully shy and only manages to make friends with his English teacher. Charlie meets two seniors, stepsiblings Patrick and Sam.

After the homecoming dance, the two invite him to a party with their group of friends. There, Charlie walks in on Patrick and Brad, the high school quarterback, kissing. Patrick tells Charlie that Brad is closeted, so he agrees to keep it a secret.

Charlie discloses to Sam that his best friend committed suicide the previous year, making her realize that he has no other friends, so she and Patrick bring him into their group. On their way home, the three hear an unknown song on the radio. Sam instructs Patrick to drive through the Fort Pitt Tunnel so she can stand up in the back of the pickup while the music blasts.

Sam needs to improve her SAT scores to have a better chance of being accepted into Penn State University, so Charlie offers to tutor her. This improves her scores, and at Christmas, she gives him a vintage typewriter as a thank you. They discuss relationships, and Charlie reveals he has never been kissed.

Sam reveals that her first kiss was at age 11 by her father's boss. Charlie shares that his Aunt Helen was sexually assaulted as a child, but she learned to deal with it and move on. Sam tells Charlie she wants his first kiss to be with someone who loves him, despite her crush on Craig, so they kiss.

At a New Year's Eve party, Charlie trips on LSD. He cannot control his flashbacks of Aunt Helen, who died in a car crash on her way to buy him his 7th birthday gift. He ends up in the hospital after passing out in the snow.

At a regular The Rocky Horror Picture Show performance, Sam asks Charlie to fill in for Craig, who she is now dating. Their friend Mary Elizabeth is impressed and asks him to the Sadie Hawkins dance, then they enter an unsatisfactory relationship. At a party, when Charlie is dared to kiss the prettiest girl in the room, he chooses Sam, upsetting both Sam and Mary Elizabeth.

Patrick tells Charlie to stay away from the group for a while, so he sinks into depression. Brad shows up to school with bruises on his face after his father caught him and Patrick together, but he claims he was jumped and beaten up in a parking lot. When Brad's friends bully Patrick during lunch, Brad does not stand up for him and calls him a "faggot".

So Patrick angrily punches Brad, who retaliates. Brad's friends beat Patrick and prevent Sam from intervening. When Charlie does, he blacks out. Upon recovering, he finds that he has incapacitated Brad's friends. Brad thanks Charlie in private, while Sam and Patrick forgive Charlie, and the three become friends again.

Charlie's mental state worsens. Patrick tries to cope with what happened with Brad and kisses Charlie before immediately apologizing. Sam is accepted into Penn State, and she breaks up with Craig on prom night, after learning he has been cheating on her. The night before Sam departs, Charlie helps her pack. They confide in each other and kiss, but when Sam touches Charlie's thigh, he experiences a flashback of his Aunt Helen, which he brushes off.

After Sam leaves for college, Charlie's emotional state and flashbacks worsen. Charlie calls his older sister Candace, blaming himself for Helen's death, and admits he may have wanted it to happen. Candace realizes he is in distress so calls the police. He is eyeing a kitchen knife as they burst through the door. Charlie then awakens in a hospital where psychiatrist Dr. Burton brings out his repressed memories, revealing that his aunt sexually abused him as a child.

The night Charlie is released from the hospital, he is visited by Sam and Patrick. The three revisit the tunnel, having identified the song ("'Heroes'" by David Bowie), and Charlie and Sam kiss. He then stands up in the back of the truck, acknowledging that he feels alive and that, at the moment, "we are infinite".

== Cast ==
- Logan Lerman as Charlie Kelmeckis
- Emma Watson as Sam
- Ezra Miller as Patrick
- Mae Whitman as Mary Elizabeth
- Kate Walsh as Mrs. Kelmeckis
- Dylan McDermott as Mr. Kelmeckis
- Melanie Lynskey as Helen, Charlie's aunt
- Nina Dobrev as Candace Kelmeckis, Charlie's sister
- Johnny Simmons as Brad Hayes
- Joan Cusack as Dr. Burton
- Paul Rudd as Mr. Anderson, Charlie's English teacher
- Nicholas Braun as Ponytail Derek, Candace's boyfriend
- Reece Thompson as Craig, Sam's boyfriend
- Julia Garner as Susan
- Tom Savini as Mr. Callahan
- Adam Hagenbuch as Bob
- Erin Wilhelmi as Alice
- Zane Holtz as Chris Kelmeckis, Charlie's older brother
- Landon Pigg as Peter

== Production ==
=== Development ===
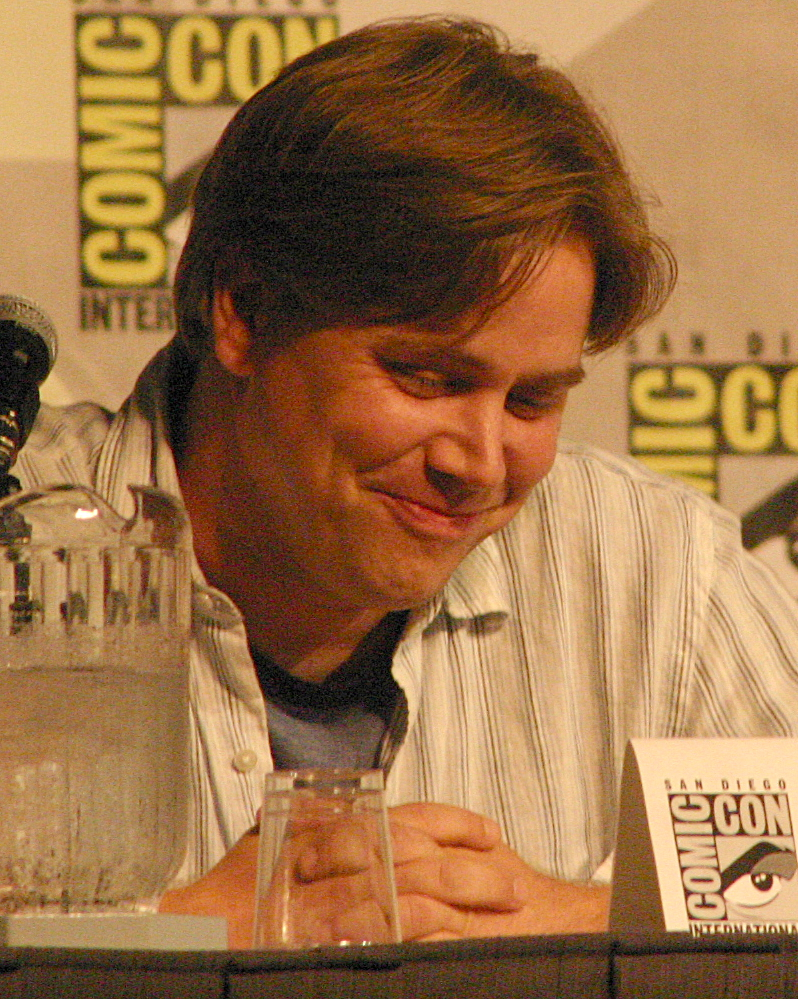
Stephen Chbosky at the 2006 San Diego Comic-Con

Chbosky incorporated both fictional ideas and personal experiences into the novel. After five years with these elements in mind, he had the idea of writing the novel during a difficult period in his life. He was experiencing an unpleasant breakup of his own, which led him to ask, "Why do good people let themselves get treated so badly?" The author tried to answer the question with the sentence "we accept the love we think we deserve". This quote references the struggle of finding self love, encompassing one's life and hope for the future, and not just romantic love.

The story began when Chbosky was in school, evolving from another book on which he was working. In that book he wrote the sentence, "I guess that's just one of the perks of being a wallflower", which led him to realize "that somewhere in that ... was the kid I was really trying to find." Chbosky began writing the novel in the summer of 1996 while he was in college, and within ten weeks he completed the story. He rewrote it into two more drafts, concluding the published version in the summer of 1998.

Charlie was loosely based on Chbosky himself. Like the novel itself, Chbosky included much of his own memories from the time he lived in Pittsburgh into the film. The other characters were manifestations of people Chbosky had known throughout his life; Chbosky focused on people's struggles and what they are passionate about, attempting to pin down the very nature of each of the characters. The characters of Sam and Patrick were an "amalgamate and celebration" of several people Chbosky has met; Sam was based on girls who confided in him, and Patrick was "all the kids I knew who were gay and finding their way to their own identity."

Shortly after the novel's release, Chbosky began to write a screenplay for it. Chbosky recalled a meeting with his agent saying, "My agent said we would average a call a week, whether it was from producers optioning it or a writer or director wanting to adapt. Even a German film company, I don't know the name of the company, but they wanted to buy it and turn it into a German film, which I would love to have seen, in an alternate universe kind of way. Yeah, there were many offers, but I couldn't let it go. I don't know how to sell something this personal. And especially what the book meant to the fans—I couldn't let it go to anyone else. I owed the fans a movie that was worthy of their love for the book." When he finally did sit down and started on penning the screenplay, he found it more difficult than the book. The novel took him just four months to write, while the script took him a year.

Chbosky would not sell the rights to the film unless a studio also let him adapt and direct the film. John Malkovich's production company—Mr. Mudd Productions—purchased the rights to the film and let Chbosky himself write the script and direct the film.

After discovering from her agent that no one in Hollywood wanted to fund the movie due to its subject matter, Emma Watson flew out to Los Angeles to pitch the film and met with multiple studio executives from all the major film studios such as Paramount, Warner Bros., Disney, etc. In January 2011 after Watson met with and pitched the film to Erik Feig, he gave the greenlight, which led to Summit acquiring the distribution rights. The following month, Summit sought a buyer for the project at the European Film Market held simultaneously with the Berlin International Film Festival.

=== Casting ===
In May 2010, Logan Lerman and Emma Watson were reportedly in talks for the project and confirmed the following year. In April 2011, Mae Whitman signed on as Mary Elizabeth and Nina Dobrev was cast as Candace. Paul Rudd was cast as Mr. Anderson later that month. On May 9, 2011, Kate Walsh announced that she was cast in the film as Charlie's mother and had begun filming. On May 19, 2011, it was announced that Ezra Miller had joined the film.

=== Filming ===
The film was shot in the Pittsburgh metropolitan area from May 9 to June 29, 2011. Initial filming began in Pittsburgh's South Hills, including South Park, Upper St. Clair, and Peters Township High School.

The Rocky Horror Picture Show scenes were filmed at the Hollywood Theater in Dormont after Chbosky learned that the theater was re-opening; he had seen The Rocky Horror Picture Show there when he was younger.

The film also has scenes within Pittsburgh city limits inside the Fort Pitt Tunnel, Fort Pitt Bridge on Interstate 376 and on Mount Washington.

== Music ==
The soundtrack to The Perks of Being a Wallflower was released by Atlantic Records on September 11, 2012, a month before the film's release. The film's music was chosen by the film's director Stephen Chbosky and music supervisor Alexandra Patsavas, while the incidental music was scored by Michael Brook. The score album was released September 25, 2012.

Chbosky wrote on the album's liner notes, "I've shared them with friends. And they have shared their favorites with me. Some of the songs are popular. Some of them are not known by a whole lot of people. But they are all great in their own way. And since these songs have meant a lot to me, I just wanted you to have them as a soundtrack for whatever you need them to be for your life."

== Release ==
The Perks of Being a Wallflower had its world premiere at the 2012 Toronto International Film Festival on September 8, 2012, to a standing ovation. It was initially scheduled for release on September 14, 2012, but in August 2012, it was announced that the release would be delayed by a week to September 21, 2012, in selected cities. The film continued to expand on September 28, 2012, with a nationwide release on October 5, 2012. The UK premiere was on September 23 at the Cambridge Film Festival.

=== Rating ===
The film originally received an R rating from the MPAA for "teen drug and alcohol use, and some sexual references". The filmmakers appealed, and the MPAA changed it to PG-13 for "mature thematic material, drug and alcohol use, sexual content including references, and a fight—all involving teens".

=== Box office ===
The Perks of Being a Wallflower received a limited release of four theaters in the United States on September 21, 2012, and grossed $228,359 on its limited opening weekend, averaging $57,089 per theater. The film earned $17,742,948 in North America and $15,641,179 in other countries, for a worldwide total of $33,384,127.

== Reception ==
On review aggregator Rotten Tomatoes, the film has an approval rating of 85% based on 172 reviews, with an average rating of 7.50/10. The website's critics consensus reads, "The Perks of Being a Wallflower is a heartfelt and sincere adaptation that's bolstered by strong lead performances." On Metacritic, it has a weighted average score of 67 out of 100, based on 36 critics, indicating "generally favorable reviews". Audiences polled by CinemaScore gave the film an average grade of "A" on an A+ to F scale.

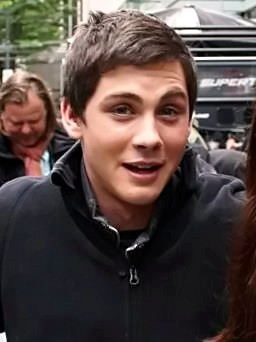
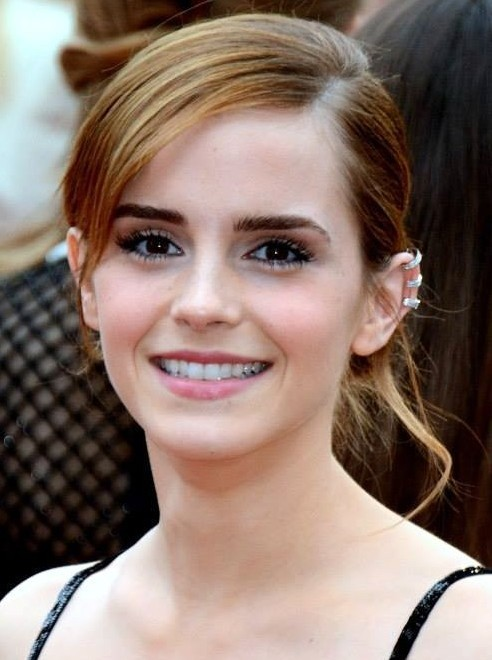
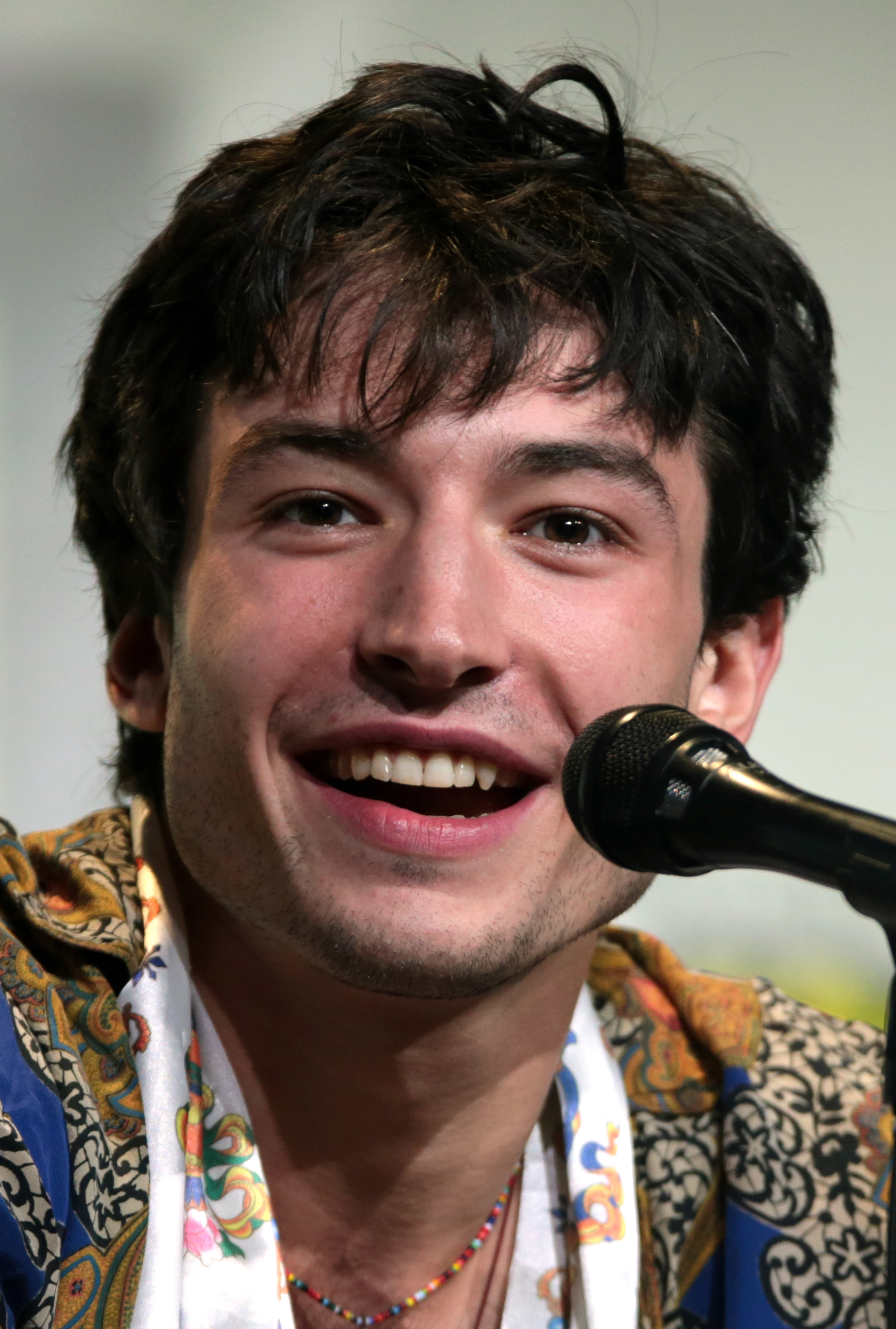
The performances of Logan Lerman, Emma Watson, and Ezra Miller (left to right) received critical acclaim.

Roger Ebert of the Chicago Sun-Times gave the film three and a half stars out of four, writing in his review, "All of my previous selves still survive somewhere inside of me, and my previous adolescent would have loved The Perks of Being a Wallflower".

The lead cast also earned positive notice. Ian Buckwalter of The Atlantic said:

The primary trio of actors delivers outstanding performances, starting with Watson, who sheds the memory of a decade playing Hermione in the Harry Potter series with an about-face as a flirtatious but insecure free spirit. Miller also plays against [their] most recent performance, which was as the tightly wound eponymous teenage psychopath in We Need to Talk About Kevin, to deliver a giddy, scene-stealing turn as Patrick. Lerman, best known for the Percy Jackson series, shines as Charlie, a role that demands he be immediately likeable while still holding onto some deep darkness that can't be fully revealed until the end.

John Anderson of Newsday also praised the cast, saying:

As Sam, the quasi-bad girl trying to reinvent herself before college, she (Emma Watson) brings honesty and a lack of cliche to a character who might have been a standard-issue student. But equally fine are her co-stars: Ezra Miller, who plays the gay character Patrick as something messy and unusual; Paul Rudd, as their English teacher, is refreshingly thoughtful. And Charlie is portrayed by Lerman as quietly observant, yearning and delicate in a way that will click with audiences regardless of age.

Some critics had a less favorable response to the film, with the main criticism being that the portrayal of teenage issues is idealized and the casting uninspired. The Miami Herald critic Connie Ogle notes that "the suicide of Charlie's best friend, which takes place before the film opens, seems glossed over too quickly" despite the event being Charlie's main character motivation in the film. Jack Wilson of The Age writes, "the script is transparently fake at almost every moment, congratulating the gang on their non-conformity while soft-pedalling any aspect of adolescent behaviour—drug use, sex, profanity—that might upset the American mainstream." Richard Corliss of Time criticized the casting of actors in their twenties to play teenage characters unlike Heathers (1989), another coming-of-age film in which the lead actors were actual teenagers.

MTV, Us Weekly and Complex named The Perks of Being a Wallflower one of the best films of 2012.

The film also influenced the "Tumblr culture" that was around online when the film was released, with online users posting GIFs of the film's cast and aphorisms on the site during the early 2010s.

In 2025, it was one of the films voted for the "Readers' Choice" edition of The New York Times' list of "The 100 Best Movies of the 21st Century," finishing at number 221.

=== Accolades ===
Award	Date of ceremony	Category	Recipient(s)	Result	Ref.
Boston Society of Film Critics	December 9, 2012	Best Supporting Actor	Ezra Miller	Won	
Boston Society of Film Critics	December 9, 2012	Best Supporting Actress	Emma Watson	Nominated	
Chicago Film Critics Association	December 17, 2012	Best Adapted Screenplay	Stephen Chbosky	Nominated	
Chicago Film Critics Association	December 17, 2012	Most Promising Filmmaker	Stephen Chbosky	Nominated	
Critics' Choice Movie Awards	January 10, 2013	Best Adapted Screenplay	Stephen Chbosky	Nominated	
Critics' Choice Movie Awards	January 10, 2013	Best Young Performer	Logan Lerman	Nominated	
Detroit Film Critics Society	December 14, 2012	Breakthrough Performance	Stephen Chbosky	Nominated	
Detroit Film Critics Society	December 14, 2012	Best Screenplay	Stephen Chbosky	Nominated	
Detroit Film Critics Society	December 14, 2012	Best Supporting Actor	Ezra Miller	Nominated	
Dorian Awards	January 18, 2013	LGBT Film of the Year	The Perks of Being a Wallflower	Nominated	
GLAAD Media Award	April 20, 2013	Outstanding Film – Wide Release	The Perks of Being a Wallflower	Won	
Hollywood Film Festival	October 23, 2012	Spotlight Award	Ezra Miller	Won	
Independent Spirit Awards	February 23, 2013	Best First Feature	Stephen Chbosky, Lianne Halfon, Russell Smith, and John Malkovich	Won	
MTV Movie Awards	April 14, 2013	Best Female Performance	Emma Watson	Nominated	
MTV Movie Awards	April 14, 2013	Best Breakthrough Performance	Ezra Miller	Nominated	
MTV Movie Awards	April 14, 2013	Best Kiss	Emma Watson and Logan Lerman	Nominated	
MTV Movie Awards	April 14, 2013	Best Musical Moment	Emma Watson, Logan Lerman and Ezra Miller	Nominated	
North Carolina Film Critics Association	October 23, 2012	Best Supporting Actress	Emma Watson	Nominated	
National Board of Review Awards	January 8, 2013	Top 10 Films	The Perks of Being a Wallflower	Won	
Phoenix Film Critics Society	October 23, 2012	Best Supporting Actress	Emma Watson	Nominated	
People's Choice Awards	January 9, 2013	Favorite Drama Movie	The Perks of Being a Wallflower	Won	
People's Choice Awards	January 9, 2013	Favorite Dramatic Movie Actress	Emma Watson	Won	
San Diego Film Critics Society	December 11, 2012	Best Adapted Screenplay	Stephen Chbosky	Nominated	
San Diego Film Critics Society	December 11, 2012	Best Supporting Actress	Emma Watson	Won	
San Diego Film Critics Society	December 11, 2012	Best Ensemble Performance	The Perks of Being a Wallflower	Won	
Santa Barbara International Film Festival	January 29, 2013	Virtuoso Award	Ezra Miller	Won	
St. Louis Film Critics Association	December 17, 2012	Best Adapted Screenplay	Stephen Chbosky	Nominated	
St. Louis Film Critics Association	December 17, 2012	Best Supporting Actress	Emma Watson	Nominated	
Teen Choice Awards	August 11, 2013	Choice Movie: Drama	The Perks of Being a Wallflower	Won	
Teen Choice Awards	August 11, 2013	Choice Movie Actor: Drama	Logan Lerman	Won	
Teen Choice Awards	August 11, 2013	Choice Movie Actress: Drama	Emma Watson	Won	
Teen Choice Awards	August 11, 2013	Choice Movie Breakout: Actor	Ezra Miller	Nominated	
Teen Choice Awards	August 11, 2013	Choice Movie Liplock	Logan Lerman and Emma Watson	Nominated	
USC Scripter Award	February 9, 2013	Best Adapted Screenplay	Stephen Chbosky	Nominated	
Washington D.C. Area Film Critics Association	December 10, 2012	Best Adapted Screenplay	Stephen Chbosky	Nominated	
Washington D.C. Area Film Critics Association	December 10, 2012	Best Youth Performance	Logan Lerman	Nominated	
Writers Guild of America Awards	February 17, 2013	Best Adapted Screenplay	Stephen Chbosky	Nominated	
