= How to Draw a Bunny =

- Directed by: John W. Walter
- Produced by: Steve Apicella; Frances Beatty; Rocky Collins; Kevin Foxe; Lianne Halfon; John Malkovich; Andrew L. Moore; Russell Smith
- Starring: Joseph Ialacci; Richard Feigen
- Cinematography: Frank G. DeMarco; Andrew L. Moore
- Edited by: John W. Walter
- Music by: Max Roach
- Production companies: Palm Pictures; Mr. Mudd Productions
- Distributed by: Artisan Entertainment
- Release date: 2002
- Running time: 90 minutes
- Country: United States
- Language: English
- Box office: $4,148

How to Draw a Bunny: A Ray Johnson Portrait, is a 2002 American documentary film about the Detroit-born pop, collage and performance artist Ray Johnson.

== Summary ==
Filmmakers John Walter and Andrew L. Moore delve into the mysterious life and death of Johnson, an artist whose “world was made up of amazing coincidences, serendipities and karmic gags,” according to Michael Kimmelman of The New York Times. After Johnson's suicide, Moore and Walter conducted interviews with artists including Christo, Chuck Close, Roy Lichtenstein, Judith Malina, and James Rosenquist. In addition, they gathered photographs, works of art, and home movies, which were edited into a fast-paced narrative exploring the artist's life.

== Reception ==
The filmmakers “couldn’t have chosen a more elusive subject for a movie; their success in evoking Johnson, and in documenting his world, is a triumph of sympathy over psychology, memory over historicism,” wrote Stuart Klawans for The Nation.

The film has a score of 78 on Metacritic. On review aggregator website Rotten Tomatoes, the film holds an approval rating of 85% based on 26 reviews, with an average rating of 7.4/10.

== Accolades ==
The film premiered at the 2002 Sundance Film Festival, where it won the Special Jury Prize. The film also won the Grand Prix du Public 2002 at the Rencontres Internationales de Cinema in Paris and was nominated for a 2003 Independent Spirit Award and listed in New York Magazine’s “Top Ten of 2004.”
