= Imaginary Friend (novel) =

2019 psychological horror novel by Stephen Chbosky

- First edition cover
- Author: Stephen Chbosky
- Audio read by: Christine Lakin
- Cover artist: gray318
- Language: English
- Genre: Horror fiction
- Set in: Mill Grove, Pennsylvania
- Publisher: Grand Central Publishing
- Publication date: October 1, 2019
- Publication place: United States
- Media type: Print (hardcover and paperback), e-book, audio
- Pages: 705
- ISBN: 978-1-5387-3133-8 (hardcover)
- OCLC: 1082178078
- Dewey Decimal: 813/.54
- LC Class: PS3553.H3469 I43 2019

Imaginary Friend is a psychological horror novel by American author Stephen Chbosky. It was published on October 1, 2019, by Grand Central Publishing and was an instant New York Times Best Seller.

== Critical reception ==
A departure from his debut novel, Imaginary Friend was very well-received and debuted as a New York Times Best Seller. The review from Time stated it evoked "echoes of Stephen King" and "well worth the time for those who dare", with additional positive reviews from The New York Times, the Kirkus Review, the Washington Post, NPR and numerous others, as well as being named one of Variety's Top 10 books of 2019.

In 2023, the book was banned, in Clay County District Schools, Florida.
