= Mr. Mudd =

American film production company

Mr. Mudd is a film production company founded in 1998 by Lianne Halfon, John Malkovich, and Russell Smith. The company is known for producing the films Ghost World (2001), Juno (2007) and The Perks of Being a Wallflower (2012), all three of which received critical acclaim.

== Formation of the company ==
The company is named for a Thai man (and convicted murderer) named Mr. Mudd who acted as Malkovich's driver while he was making The Killing Fields in 1984.

Malkovich met Russell Smith in high school, where Smith was a star basketball player for the Lanphier High School Lions in Springfield, Illinois. The two later became freshman roommates at Eastern Illinois University. Malkovich later co-founded the Steppenwolf Theater Company, and invited Smith to become a writer for the troupe. Smith later produced a number of Steppenwolf plays, then moved into film production. Malkovich and Smith formed the Smith-Malkovich film production company in 1994.

Malkovich met Lianne Halfon in the late 1980s while she was an executive at A&M Films. Malkovich and Halfon were both bidding for the film rights to author Don DeLillo's 1988 novel about Lee Harvey Oswald, Libra. A&M films won the auction, and Halfon asked Malkovich to help develop the property. Although the film never coalesced, Malkovich asked Halfon to help produce a version of the novel as a play for the Steppenwolf Theater. The three first met while developing Libra for Steppenwolf.

Having Malkovich's name attached to the company did not initially prove valuable. According to Smith, writers and financers kept turning down Mr. Mudd because they assumed Malkovich would want to star in the film. The company was forced to stop mentioning Malkovich's involvement, and did not look for a property for Malkovich to act in for three years.

== Operations ==
Malkovich describes his involvement in the company as minimal, limited to finding novels and plays which might be worth producing. Russell Smith, however, says that Malkovich also is good at developing a property, provides excellent script notes, and has a strong sense of good editing. According to Halfon, the three principals are attracted to properties for very different reasons, but each has the "same sensibility": "Each of us might pick up a different book, but what that person finds interesting in that book will be something the other two will see as something that can make a movie."

Halfon has described the three principals as very hands-on during production. "We are there every day on the set, we're there at the answer print, we're there at the mix, we're there at the delivery. We supervise the transfer to DVD," she told Filmmaker magazine in 2003. Helping writers and directors protect their vision of what the film should be, she says, is what draws filmmakers to Mr. Mudd.

Beginning in 2003, Mr. Mudd became more involved in producing films for television. The principals say they enjoy the faster production times which television offers.

The company had a financing and development deal with United Artists which ended in 2004. The deal funded production costs, but not Mr. Mudd's overhead. When the UA deal ended, Mr. Mudd began raising money for its projects through private equity financing. Mr. Mudd signed a first-look deal with Mandate Pictures in July 2008.

== Notable films produced by Mr. Mudd ==
Year	Film	Awards	Notes
2001	Ghost World	Independent Spirit Award for Best First Screenplay; Independent Spirit Award for Best Supporting Male	
2002	The Dancer Upstairs		
2002	How to Draw a Bunny		
2004	The Libertine	BIFA for Best Supporting Actress	
2006	Art School Confidential		
2007	Juno	Academy Award for Best Original Screenplay; BAFTA Award for Best Original Screenplay	
2009	Which Way Home	Emmy Award for Outstanding Informational Programming-Long Form	
2009	Afterwards		
2011	Young Adult		
2012	The Perks of Being a Wallflower	Independent Spirit Award for Best First Feature	
2013	Broken City		
2013	Chávez		
2013	Labor Day		
2015	Demolition		
