= Jim Dow =

American photographer

Jim Dow (born 1942, Boston, Massachusetts) is an American photographer who specializes in photographing places.

== Education ==
He studied at the Rhode Island School of Design, earning a BFA in graphic design in 1965 and MFA in photography in 1968.

== Career ==
In the tradition of Walker Evans, Dow examines both high and low, such as baseball stadiums, universities, court houses, Americana, private clubs in New York. His detailed work is printed from 8×10″ negatives and brings the richness of texture and light to the forefront.

Dow photographs urban and rural architectural sites, from drive-in fruit stands to Gothic cathedrals. 8×10″ negatives provide clarity and precision in his prints, either contact prints or 20×24″.

He is a Professor of the Practice Emeritus at Tufts University. He has also published two books, Marking the Land (2007) with the North Dakota Museum of Art and the University of Chicago Press, and American Studies (2011) with The Center for Documentary Studies at Duke University and PowerHouse Books.

Dow's work is held in the permanent collection of several institutions, including the J. Paul Getty Museum, the Art Institute of Chicago, the High Museum of Art, the Rose Art Museum, the Nelson-Atkins Museum of Art, the University of Michigan Museum of Art, the Canadian Centre for Architecture, the George Eastman House International Museum of Photography and Film, the Library of Congress, the Museum of Modern Art, and the Victoria and Albert Museum.

== Exhibitions ==
- 2012: “EAT,” A Lightbox Exhibition at Grand Central Terminal. (solo)
- 2011: "American Studies," Janet Borden, Inc. (solo)
- 2010: "Fields of Dreams: North American Baseball Stadiums by Photographer Jim Dow," Castellani Art Museum
- 2008: "Old School," Janet Borden, Inc. (solo)
- 2004: "Jim Dow American and National League Stadiums" at the Zillman Art Museum
