= Stephen Chbosky =

American writer and director (born 1970)

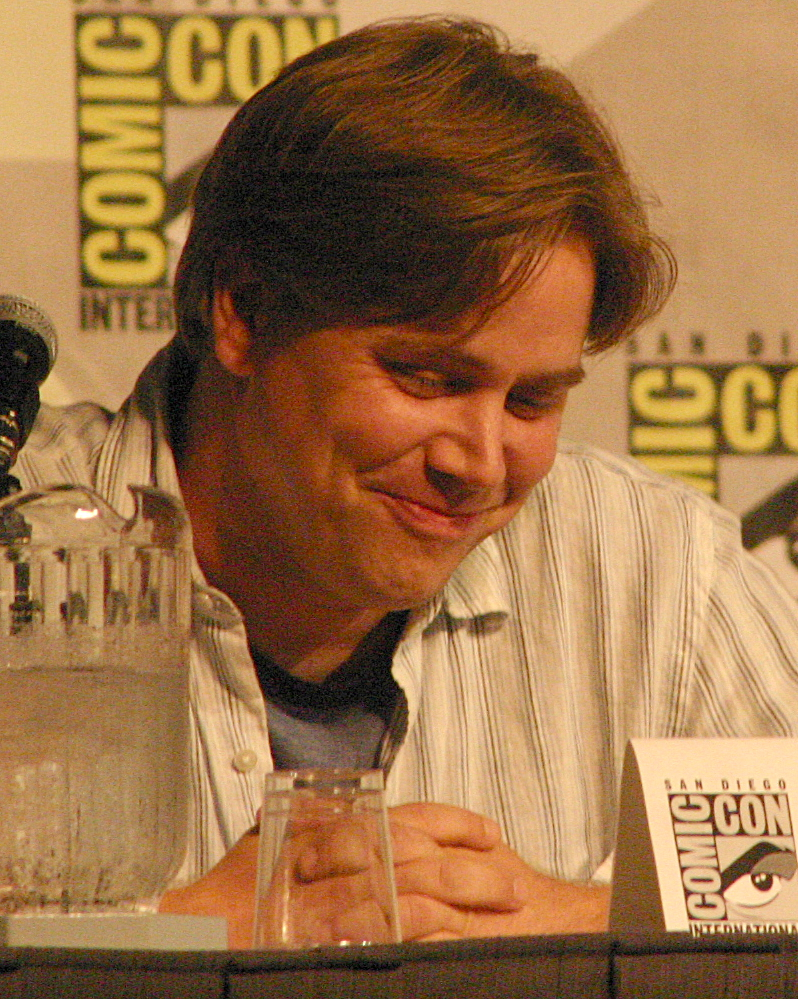
- Chbosky on the Jericho panel at San Diego Comic-Con, 2006
- Born: January 25, 1970 (age 56); Pittsburgh, Pennsylvania, U.S.
- Occupations: Screenwriter; director; author
- Relatives: John Erick Dowdle (brother-in law)
- Writing career
- Years active: 1995–present

Stephen Chbosky (/ʃəˈbɒski/; born January 25, 1970) is an American film director, screenwriter, and author. He is best known for writing the bestselling coming-of-age novel The Perks of Being a Wallflower (1999), and writing and directing its 2012 film adaptation. He also directed the drama Wonder (2017) and the 2021 film adaptation of Dear Evan Hansen. His first psychological horror novel, Imaginary Friend, was published in October 2019.

== Early life ==
Chbosky was born in Pittsburgh, Pennsylvania, and was raised the suburb of Upper St. Clair Township, Pennsylvania. He is the son of Lea (née Meyer), a tax preparer, and Fred G. Chbosky, a steel company executive and consultant to CFOs. Chbosky has a sister, Stacy, who is married to director John Erick Dowdle. As a teenager, Chbosky "enjoyed a good blend of the classics, horror, and fantasy." He was heavily influenced by J. D. Salinger's novel The Catcher in the Rye and the writing of F. Scott Fitzgerald and Tennessee Williams. Chbosky graduated from Upper St. Clair High School in 1988, around which time he met Stewart Stern, screenwriter of the 1955 James Dean film Rebel Without a Cause. Stern became Chbosky's "good friend and mentor", and proved a major influence on Chbosky's career.

== Career ==
In 1992, Chbosky graduated from the University of Southern California's Filmic Writing, screenwriting program. He wrote, directed, and acted in the 1995 independent film The Four Corners of Nowhere, which gained Chbosky his first agent. It also was accepted by the Sundance Film Festival, and became one of the first films shown on the Sundance Channel. In the late 1990s, Chbosky wrote several unproduced screenplays, including ones titled Audrey Hepburn's Neck and Schoolhouse Rock.

In 1994, Chbosky was working on a "very different type of book" than The Perks of Being a Wallflower when he wrote the line, "I guess that's just one of the perks of being a wallflower." Chbosky recalled that he "wrote that line. And stopped. And realized that somewhere in that [sentence] was the kid I was really trying to find." After several years of gestation, Chbosky began researching and writing The Perks of Being a Wallflower, an epistolary novel that follows the intellectual and emotional maturation of a teenager who uses the alias Charlie over the course of his first year of high school. The book is semi-autobiographical; Chbosky has said that he "relate[s] to Charlie[...] But my life in high school was in many ways different."

The book, Chbosky's first novel, was published by Pocket Books in 1999, and was an immediate popular success with teenage readers; by 2000, the novel was MTV Books' best-selling title, and The New York Times noted in 2007 that it had sold more than 700,000 copies and "is passed from adolescent to adolescent like a hot potato". As of May 2013, the number of copies in print reached over two million. Wallflower also stirred up controversy due to Chbosky's portrayal of teen sexuality and drug use. The book has been removed from circulation in several schools and appeared on the American Library Association's 2004, 2006, 2007, 2008, 2009, 2013, 2014, 2022 and 2023 lists of the 10 most frequently challenged books. In July 2013, The Perks of Being a Wallflower had spent over a year on the New York Times Bestseller list, and was published in 31 languages.

In 2000, Chbosky edited Pieces, an anthology of short stories. The same year, he worked with director Jon Sherman on a film adaptation of Michael Chabon's novel The Mysteries of Pittsburgh, though the project fell apart by August 2000. Chbosky wrote the screenplay for the 2005 film adaptation of the Broadway rock musical Rent, which received mixed reviews. In late 2005, Chbosky said that he was writing a film adaptation of The Perks of Being a Wallflower.

In the mid-2000s, Chbosky decided, on the advice of his agent, to begin looking for work in television in addition to film. Finding he "enjoyed the people [he met who were working] in television", Chbosky agreed to serve as co-creator, executive producer, and writer of the CBS serial television drama Jericho, which premiered in September 2006. The series revolves around the inhabitants of the fictional small town of Jericho, Kansas in the aftermath of several nuclear attacks. Chbosky has said the relationship between Jake Green, the main character, and his mother, reflected "me and my mother in a lot of ways". The first season of Jericho had lackluster ratings, and CBS canceled the show in May 2007. A grassroots campaign to revive the series convinced CBS to renew the series for a second season, which premiered on February 12, 2008, before being canceled once more in March 2008.

Chbosky wrote the screenplay of and directed the film The Perks of Being a Wallflower, based on his novel. Production took place in mid-2011, and the film was released in fall 2012. The film starred Logan Lerman, Emma Watson and Ezra Miller. Chbosky was nominated in the Best Adapted Screenplay category for the 2013 Writers Guild Awards, and the film won the 2013 Independent Spirit Awards for Best First Feature, as well as the 2013 People's Choice Award for Best Dramatic Movie.

Chbosky re-wrote Evan Spiliotopoulos original script for the 2017 live action reboot of Disney's Beauty and the Beast, directed by Bill Condon and starring Emma Watson as Belle and Dan Stevens as the Beast. Chbosky and Watson developed a close relationship during the production of The Perks of Being a Wallflower. The adaptation was faithful to the original 1991 animated film Beauty and the Beast, with all the original musical numbers included. The film was released on March 17, 2017.

Chbosky directed the 2017 film Wonder, co-written by Chbosky, Jack Thorne, and Steve Conrad and based on the 2012 novel of the same name by R. J. Palacio. The film starred Julia Roberts, Owen Wilson, and Jacob Tremblay, and was released on November 17, 2017.

On November 29, 2018, Universal Pictures announced that Chbosky was in talks to direct the film adaptation of Steven Levenson and Pasek & Paul's Tony Award-winning musical, Dear Evan Hansen. On June 11, 2020, he was officially confirmed to direct the film. It stars Ben Platt in the title role, which he originated on Broadway, along with Kaitlyn Dever, Amandla Stenberg, Nik Dodani, Colton Ryan, Amy Adams, Danny Pino and Julianne Moore. The film had its world premiere at the 2021 Toronto International Film Festival on September 9, 2021, as its Opening Night Gala Presentation, and was released in theaters on September 24, 2021.

In October 2019, Chbosky's second novel, Imaginary Friend, debuted as a Top 10 The New York Times Best Seller.

== Personal life ==
Chbosky currently resides in Los Angeles, California. He credits screenwriter Stewart Stern with inspiring him to be a writer.

== Filmography ==
Film

Year	Title	Director	Writer	Producer	Notes
1995	The Four Corners of Nowhere	Yes	Yes	Associate	Also actor Role: Finneas
2005	Rent	No	Yes	No	Adapted for the screen
2007	The Poughkeepsie Tapes	No	No	Executive	
2012	The Perks of Being a Wallflower	Yes	Yes	Executive	Also based on his novel
2016	Leaving Vogue Moran	No	No	Executive	
2017	Beauty and the Beast	No	Yes	No	
2017	Wonder	Yes	Yes	No	
2021	Dear Evan Hansen	Yes	No	No	
2025	Nonnas	Yes	No	No	
TBA	Weekend Warriors	Yes	Yes	No	Post-production

Television

Year	Title	Writer	Executive producer	Creator	Notes
2000	Brutally Normal	Yes	No	No	2 episodes
2006–08	Jericho	Yes	Yes	Yes	

== Bibliography ==
Year	Title	Publisher	Pages	Notes
1999	The Perks of Being a Wallflower	MTV Books	224	American Library Association Best Book for Young Adults (2000); American Library Association Best Book for Reluctant Readers (2000); Was made into a film version of the same name in 2012
2019	Imaginary Friend	Grand Central Publishing	720	
