= Louisiana Film Prize =

- Location: Shreveport, Louisiana, United States
- Founded: 2012
- Awards: Louisiana Film Prize ($50,000), iTunes Distribution, Automatic Entry to Other Festivals, Filmmaking Grants, Best Actor/Actress, Cross/Cut Editing Award (2013 only)
- Film titles: 20
- Festival date: Mid-October
- Website: http://prizefest.com/film

Louisiana Film Prize, often shorted to Film Prize, is an annual film contest and festival founded in 2012 by documentary filmmaker Gregory Kallenberg. The contest is directed by Kallenberg and film producer and editor Chris Lyon, a longtime collaborator of Kallenberg's. The Louisiana Film Prize is held in Shreveport, Louisiana. The contest invites filmmakers from across the country to shoot a short film in a predefined geography—primarily centered in Shreveport and Caddo Parish—for the chance to win $50,000, one of the largest cash prizes for a short film in the world. Films may be no less than five minutes and no more than fifteen minutes total runtime. The prize winner is determined by both festival attendees and a judges panel, who are required to view all twenty shorts, separated into two slates of ten films each, and confirmed by punch card in order to place a vote. Each group accounts for 50% of the total vote. Filmmakers can also win grants for filmmaking for $3,000 through a separate voting process.

For the 2020 and 2021 competitions, the grand prize was reduced to $25,000 as the pandemic created fundraising challenges for organizers. The $50,000 prize was reinstated for the 2022 festival.

== History ==
=== 2012 Festival: Inaugural Year ===
The 2012 festival was attended by 1,700 people and the prize was won by Shreveport filmmakers Noah Scruggs, Thomas Woodruff, and Chris Armand for their film "The Legend of Luther Anderson."

=== 2013 Festival ===
For the 2013 contest and festival, organizers are added additional prizes which can by won by filmmakers including five grants for $3,000, as opposed to three for the 2012 festival, for filmmakers to return and create a film for the 2014 festival. Prizes also included automatic admission to other film festivals around the country and distribution on iTunes and other avenues through Shorts International. The "Top 20" films competing in the 2013 contest were announced August 15, 2013 and the festival was held October 4–6, 2014. The New Orleans–based film "Silo" took home the grand prize in addition to a special state-sponsored "Cross/Cut" award.

=== 2014 Festival ===
The 2014 Film Prize saw the addition of a best actor/actress prizes The Bradley and Alyce awards. Returning was the large cash prize, the Founders' Circle filmmaking grants, festival placement, and distribution opportunity via Shorts HD. The "Top 20" films who competed the 2014 contest were announced August 12, 2014. On October 12 at the Awards Brunch, it was announced that "True Heroes" by director Chris Ganucheau of New Orleans won the grand prize. The Alyce Best Actress and Bradley Best Actor awards were bestowed upon Chelsea Bryan of "Angel of Joy" and James Palmer of "Snip" respectively.

=== 2015 Festival ===
The fourth Louisiana Film Prize was the largest by far in terms of attendance, filmmaker entries, and number of venues. Returning were the Bradley and Alyce actor/actress awards, Founders' Circle, festival placement, distribution, and the $50,000 cash prize. The Top 20 films were announced August 12, 2015. On October 4, it was announced that "The Bespoke Tailoring of Mister Bellamy" by director Alexander Jeffrey of El Dorado, Arkansas won the grand prize. The Top 5 were named as "American Virgin" by Tamzin Merchant, "Honey and the Hive" by Austin Alward, "Hut Hut" by Michael Almond and Courtney Sandifer, "Jackdaw" by Travis Champagne, and "The Bespoke Tailoring of Mister Bellamy" by Alexander Jeffery. The Alyce Best Actress was Georgia Rose Bell of "Two Roads" and the Bradley Best Actor awards was given to Stan Brown of "The Bespoke Tailoring of Mister Bellamy", the first non-Louisiana film to win the grand prize.

=== 2016 Festival ===
During the 2016 competition season, organizers founded the Memphis Film Prize competition which took place in Shelby County, Tennessee and consisted of 10 finalists and a $10,000 cash prize. The winner of the Memphis competition would also automatically become the 21st competitor in the Louisiana Film Prize. The Top 21 films were announced on August 16, 2016. The Top 5 films were "The Man from Mars" by Jonnie Stapleton, "Memoir" by Alexander Jeffery who won the 2015 grand prize, "Native" by Travis Bible and Stephen Kinigopolous, "The Stand" by Eva Contis, and "Ya Albi (My Heart)" by Christine Chen. Best Performance awards went to Frances Watson of "The Importance of Sex Education" and Kemerton Hargrove of "The 30 Year Deal." The grand prize was awarded to "The Man from Mars" by Jonnie Stapleton the first winner from California.

=== 2017 Festival ===
The 2017 festival returned the number of competition films to 20 with Memphis Film Prize becoming a wholly independent competition. The competition also saw the largest number of film submissions to date for the Louisiana competition. The Top 5 films were "Candyland" by Taylor Bracewell, "Exit Strategy" by Travis Bible, "My Father's Son" by returning winner Kyle Clements, "Scoundrels" by Mark Blitch, and "Stag" by returning winner Jonnie Stapleton. Best performance awards were given to Danielle Wheeler of "Scoundrels" and Herbert Russel of "Stag." The grand prize was awarded to "Exit Strategy" by Travis Bible, marking the second California winner and third non-Louisiana–based filmmaker to win.

=== 2018 Festival ===
The Top 5 films for the 2018 competition were "Esmerelda" by Paul Petersen, "Funky Butt" by returning winner Jonnie Stapleton, "Girl Steals Painting" by returning winner Alexander Jeffery, "Lilac Ocean Pumpkin Pine" by Sarah Phillips, and "War Paint" by J.C. Doler. The Best Performance winners were Jaya McSharma of "#BrownBridgetMD" and Isaac Clay of "Funky Butt." The grand prize was awarded to "Funky Butt" by Jonnie Stapleton of Los Angeles, which marks the first time a filmmaker won the competition twice.

=== 2019 Festival ===
The Top 5 films for the 2019 competition were “Anniversary” by James Harlon Palmer, “Black Pajamas” by Hattie Haggard Gobble, “Ghosted” by Blayne Weaver, “Leo & Grace,” by Gabriel Savodivker, and “Maven Voyage” Rachel Emerson. Best Performance awards were given to Rachel Emerson for "Maven Voyage" and Richard Kohnke "...and that is why I succeed." The grand prize winner was "Anniversary" by James Harlon Palmer, marking the first winner from festival hometown Shreveport since the inaugural festival.

=== 2020 Festival ===
In 2020, the competition kicked off as a standard competition year, but as the COVID-19 pandemic ravaged the world, organizers were forced to change key competition rules. First, organizers announced that filming could take place anywhere in Louisiana for the first time where previously it had been limited to a seven-parish area of Northwest Louisiana, though this “film-in-place” rule was available only to Louisiana resident filmmakers. Louisiana resident filmmakers were limited to filming with in a 30-mile radius of the director's residence to discourage unnecessary travel. Any filmmakers traveling to Louisiana from other states would still be required to film in the Northwest Louisiana area. The deadline was also extended from July to August to allow additional time for filmmaking while still maintaining the October festival dates. Finally, the competition was the lowering of the prize to $25,000 cash due to challenges in fundraising caused by the pandemic and the festival would take place entirely virtually. The Top 5 films were "Away" by Anne Nichols Brown, "Double Date Night" by Alexander Jeffery and Paul Petersen, "Imminent" by Topher Simon, "Nice to Meet You" by Michael Landry, and "Untitled Post-Baby Project" by Lorna Street Dopson. Best Performance accolades were awarded to Teri Wyble for their role in "Nice to Meet You" and Garrett Kruithof for "Three Mile Hell." The grand prize winner was "Untitled Post-Baby Project" by Lorna Street Dopson, marking the first woman filmmaker winner in the festival's history.

== Grand Prize Winners ==
These filmmakers were selected by a combined vote of the audience and judges panel to receive the festival's Grand Prize.

Year	Film	Director(s)	Origin of director
2012	The Legend of Luther Anderson	Noah Scruggs, Thomas Woodruff, and Chris Armand	Shreveport, Louisiana
2013	Silo	Kyle Clements	New Orleans, Louisiana
2014	True Heroes	Chris Ganucheau	New Orleans, Louisiana
2015	The Bespoke Tailoring of Mister Bellamy	Alexander Jeffery	El Dorado, Arkansas
2016	The Man from Mars	Jonnie Stapleton	Los Angeles, California
2017	Exit Strategy	Travis Bible	Los Angeles, California
2018	Funky Butt	Jonnie Stapleton	Los Angeles, California
2019	Anniversary	James Harlon Palmer	Shreveport, Louisiana
2020	Untitled Post-Baby Project	Lorna Street Dopson	New Orleans, Louisiana
2021	Shreveport Son	Mark D. Bonner	Shreveport, Louisiana
2022	They Grow Up So Fast	John Beach	Los Angeles, California
2023	The Candy Lady	Monique Morton Derouselle	Lafayette, Louisiana
2024	Sex Date	Mike Nicholas	Los Angeles, California
2025	Last Minute	Michael Cusumano	New York, NY

== Best Performance Winners ==
The Film Prize award for best performance began in 2014 with two categories, Best Performance by an Actor and Best Performance by an Actress. In 2022, the gendered awards were removed to create a single winner category.

Year	Performer	Film
2014	Chelsea Bryan	Angel of Joy
2014	James Harlon Palmer	Snip
2015	Georgia Rose Bell	Two Roads
2015	Stan Brown	The Bespoke Tailoring of Mister Bellamy
2016	Frances Watson	The Importance of Sex Education
2016	Kemerton Hargrove	The 30 Year Deal
2017	Danielle Wheeler	Scoundrels
2017	Herbert Russel	Stag
2018	Jaya McSharma	#BrownBridgetMD
2018	Isaac Clay	Funky Butt
2019	Rachel Emerson	Maven Voyage
2019	Richard Kohnke	And That is Why I Succeed
2020	Teri Wyble	Nice to Meet You
2020	Garrett Kruithof	Three Mile Hell
2021	Anamé Rose Walt	Moonlight Dancer
2021	Mark D. Bonner	Shreveport Son
2022	John Beach	They Grow Up So Fast
2023	Cheryl Shelton	The Candy Lady
2024	Moriah L. Hicks	Three Sessions
2025	Abby Tozer	The Old Man at the Bar
2025	Ty Hudson	Girl Dad

== In Memorium Tribute ==
Since 2016, the Louisiana Film Prize has included a still frame of a community member who has passed away in the welcome video shown at the start of each festival screening.

Year	Performer	Film
2016	Jane Ryder	Costumer, Actress, Film Prize Volunteer
2017	Trish Hooper	Actor
2018	Richard Summers	Film Prize Staff Family Member and Volunteer
2019	Mark Goff	Owner of 516 Soundstage Music Hall
2020	Jim Hayes	Prop Maker, Actor, Film Prize Volunteer
2021	Fred Phillips and Electra Churchill	Film Prize Sponsors
2022	Richard Folmer	Actor, Theatre Teacher
2023	Jim Malsch	Prize Sponsor, Local Developer and Arts Patron
2024	Stan Carpenter; Neil Johnson; Dennis Hershberger; Anne Gremillion; Dalys Cordero	Shreveport Photojournalist; Shreveport Photographer; Film Prize film producer; Shreveport advertising agent and arts patron; Prize Volunteer
2025	Casey Habich	Media educator, early Film Prize photographer
