= Katherine Dieckmann =

American film director

Katherine Dieckmann (born 1961/62) is an American film and music video director known for her work with R.E.M. in addition to the feature films A Good Baby (2000) and Diggers (2006).

She is also known for having directed The Adventures of Pete & Pete, a cult children's television series on Nickelodeon.

She was born in New York City to Herbert Dieckmann (1906–1986) and Jane Marsh Dieckmann (1933–2025). Dieckmann has a Bachelor of Arts in English from Vassar College and a Master of Arts in English from New York University. She also took a 16 mm filmmaking course one summer at Cornell University, where she made a short film called I'm So Bored. This was her only directing experience before the R.E.M. song "Stand".

Before becoming a filmmaker, she worked as a journalist and critic, writing for outlets like Rolling Stone and Elle.

In addition, she has taught screenwriting at Columbia University since the 1990s.

She lives in the West Village of New York City with her husband, Brian Wallis, the chief curator and director of exhibitions at the International Center of Photography. They have two children, a son and a daughter.

== Filmography ==
=== Music videos ===
- R.E.M. – "Stand" (1989)
- R.E.M. – "Shiny Happy People" (1991)
- Kristin Hersh – "Your Ghost" (1994)
- Sharon Van Etten – "Jupiter 4" (2018)

=== Films ===
- A Good Baby (2000)
- Diggers (2006)
- Motherhood (2009)
- Strange Weather (2016)
