= Thor Harris =

American drummer

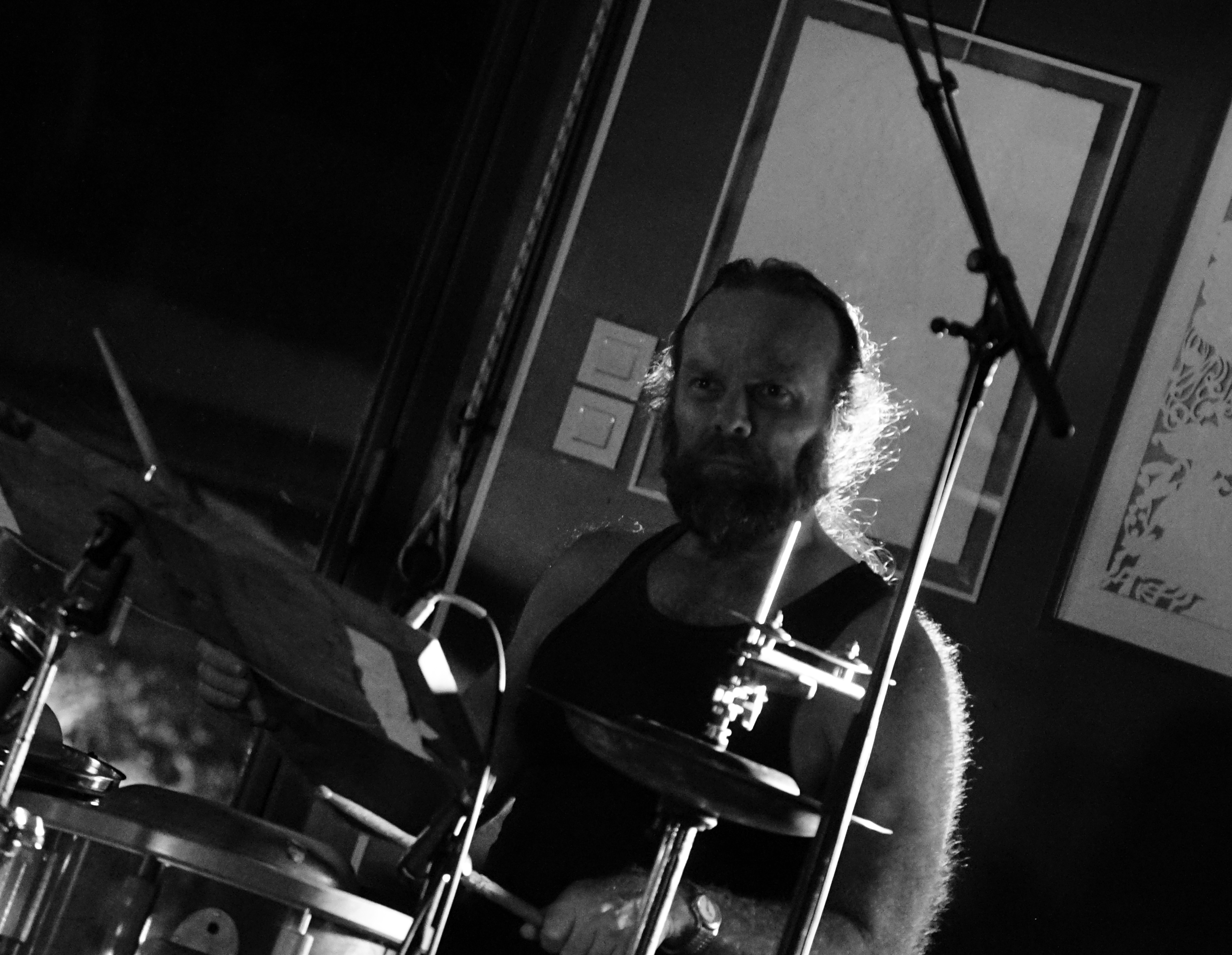
- Harris in 2018

Background information
- Born: February 7, 1965 (age 61)
- Genres: Experimental; indie rock; folk; experimental rock
- Occupations: Musician; carpenter; art instructor
- Instruments: Drums; percussion; dulcimer; clarinet; keyboards; violin; viola; accordion; melodica; guitar; bass; trombone
- Years active: 1986–present

Thor Harris (born February 7, 1965) is an artist, sculptor, musician, painter, carpenter and handyman. He was the percussionist for Swans (2010–2016). He has performed with Shearwater (2001–2010), Bill Callahan, The Angels of Light, Lisa Germano, Yonatan Gat, Gretchen Phillips, Devendra Banhart, Rebecca Cannon, Xiu Xiu, Flock of Dimes & Amanda Palmer, Whalesong, and the Grand Theft Orchestra. He has recorded at least six instrumental albums with the Austin producer Rob Halverson. He also contributed to Ben Frost's 2014 album, Aurora. He joined the touring lineup of Xiu Xiu as a percussionist in February 2017 and he has enjoyed touring with Thor & Friends since 2015.

On October 28, 2010, Harris wrote a short outline on "How To Tour In A Band Or Whatever". This set of '21 rules' spread widely across the internet. Harris also wrote and illustrated the 'zine/pamphlet Ocean of Despair, about depression, as a companion to his recorded album of the same title.

== Personal life ==
Harris posted a video to his Twitter account titled "How To Punch A Nazi" as a response to the rise of Richard Spencer, and on February 8, 2017, Twitter briefly suspended Harris's account for the video. On August 10, 2017, Harris announced his candidacy for governor of Texas on Twitter. Thor Harris also builds custom musical instruments.

== Discography ==
=== With Swans ===
- My Father Will Guide Me Up a Rope to the Sky (2010, Swans)
- The Seer (2012, Swans)
- To Be Kind (2014, Swans)
- The Glowing Man (2016, Swans)

=== With Thor & Friends ===
- Thor & Friends (2016, Thor & Friends)
- The Subversive Nature of Kindness (2017, Thor & Friends)
- 3 (2020, Thor & Friends, on Joyful Noise Recordings)
- 4 (2020, Thor & Friends, on Joyful Noise Recordings)

=== With Shearwater ===
- The Dissolving Room (2001, Shearwater on Grey Flat)
- Everybody Makes Mistakes (2002, Shearwater on Misra)
- Winged Life (2004, Shearwater on Misra)
- Palo Santo (2006, Shearwater on Misra)
- Rook (2008, Shearwater)
- The Golden Archipelago (2010, Shearwater)

=== With Rob Halverson ===
- Fields of Innards (1999, Thor Harris and Rob Halverson)
- Robinson Ear's Little Whirled of Sound (2000, Rob Halverson)
- One Night Only (2002, Rob Halverson)
- Second Whirled (2004, Rob Halverson)
- Fields of Innards II (2010, Thor Harris and Rob Halverson)
- Fields of Innards III (2019, Thor Harris and Rob Halverson, on Joyful Noise Recordings)

=== With Shahzad Ismaily ===
- With Anni Rossi (2019, Shahzad & Thor, on Joyful Noise Recordings)

=== Joyful Noise Recordings - Artist In Residence 2019 ===
Harris's six 2019 releases on Joyful Noise Recordings were issued both as six individual digital albums and as one limited-edition (666 copies) set of six colored-vinyl records in a wooden box.

- Fields of Innards III (2019, Thor Harris and Rob Halverson, on Joyful Noise Recordings)
- Is Adam OK? (2019, Thor Harris & Joyful Noise Players, on Joyful Noise Recordings)
- 3 (2019, Thor & Friends, on Joyful Noise Recordings)
- 4 (2019, Thor & Friends, on Joyful Noise Recordings)
- With Anni Rossi (2019, Shahzad & Thor, on Joyful Noise Recordings)
- Doom Dub (2019, Thor Harris, on Joyful Noise Recordings)

=== Other ===
- New Mother (1999, Angels of Light on Young God Records)
- How I Loved You (2001, Angels of Light on Young God Records)
- Everything Is Good Here/Please Come Home (2003, Angels of Light on Young God Records)
- Rejoicing in the Hands (2004, Devendra Banhart on Young God Records)
- Niño Rojo (2004, Devendra Banhart on Young God Records)
- A River Ain't Too Much to Love (May 31, 2005; Smog (Bill Callahan))
- Woke on a Whaleheart (April 17, 2007; Bill Callahan on Drag City)
- Drums and Drunken Circuit (2009, Thor Harris, Rob Halverson, and Bill Callahan)
- You Knew (2012, Mother Falcon)
- Dream River (2013, Bill Callahan, on Drag City)
- A U R O R A (2014, Ben Frost)
- Noplace (2017, Aidan Baker/Simon Goff/Thor Harris)
- Radiance of a Thousand Suns (2019, Whalesong, Self- Released)
- Io (2019, Little Mazarn on Self Sabotage Records)
- Medicine Singers (2022, Stone Tapes & Joyful Noise Recordings)
- I Didn't Mean to Haunt You (2022, Quadeca, on deadAir)
- Mjölnir (2023, Cinema Cinema, on Nefarious Industries)
