= Not Yet =

Not Yet, Not yet, or not yet may refer to:

- Madadayo (English: Not Yet), a 1993 Japanese film by Akira Kurosawa
- Not Yet (Art Blakey album), 1988
- Not Yet (Monotonix album), 2011
- Not Yet (band), a sub-unit of the all-female Japanese pop group AKB48
- "Not Yet", a song by Ayumi Hamasaki from Secret
- "Not Yet", a song by Brett Young from Weekends Look a Little Different These Days
- "Not Yet", song by Jenn Bostic
- "Not Yet", a 2024 song by High Valley from Small Town Somethin'
- "Not Yet", an episode of One Day at a Time (2017 TV series)
- An aspect of the Kingdom of God in inaugurated eschatology
