= Wabanaki =

Wabanaki, Wabenaki, Wobanaki, etc. may refer to:

- Wabanaki Confederacy, a confederation of five First Nations in North America
  - Abenaki, one member Nation of the Wabanaki Confederacy
- People who speak one of the Eastern Algonquian languages
