= Medicine Singers =

International musical group

- Also known as: Eastern Medicine Singers
- Origin: Pokanoket, Tel Aviv, et al.
- Genres: Pow wow; experimental rock; psychedelic rock
- Years active: 2017–present
- Labels: Joyful Noise, Stone Tapes
- Members: Daryl "Black Eagle" Jamieson; Ray Two Hawks; Yonatan Gat; Ryan Olson; Thor Harris; Lee Ranaldo; Laraaji; Jaimie Branch; Joe Rainey Sr.

Medicine Singers is a group of singers and drummers in the Native American pow wow style. They sing in an Eastern Algonquian dialect under their original moniker, Eastern Medicine Singers.

In 2017, they began collaborating with Israeli guitarist and producer Yonatan Gat, formerly of Monotonix, after meeting him in Austin, Texas, at the annual SXSW festival. After doing a number of one-off projects together, they teamed up to explore "a completely new realm of music" that they included on their self-titled debut album, released by Joyful Noise Recordings in association with a new sub-label called Stone Tapes, in 2022.

== History ==
=== Pre-2017: Eastern Algonquian revival ===
Before branching out as Medicine Singers, Daryl "Black Eagle" Jamieson, Ray Two Hawks, and other members of the original group had been providing drumming and singing music at New England pow wows and other gatherings. They sang mostly in Eastern Algonquian, a surviving branch of one of the most widely distributed mother tongues of Native American peoples on the continent. Jamieson, who has also served as clan chief of the Pocasset Wampanoag Tribe of the Pokanoket Nation, learned this language under the guidance of a now-deceased elder and chief, Clinton Wixon, who studied the Wampanoag dialect. Preserving, reviving, resurrecting, and celebrating endangered Native American languages and dialects as well as maintaining aspects of ceremonial tradition and communion within these groups has always been a part of the band's mission.

In a 2022 interview with The Fader, Jamieson stated, "[Our people] are the people of the first light—we see the light first—we are the guardians of the first gates". "It's a tradition for us to do these prayers in the morning to thank the Creator for life. It's a very important song, and I gave it to my tribe, the Pocasset Tribe of the Pokanoket Nation. It's important to keep these songs and pass them down to the generations—that's why we want to show the words, to help people know that this language is still out there and some people are still speaking it."

=== 2017–2021: New directions ===
Yonatan Gat saw Eastern Medicine Singers during an outdoor performance in Austin, Texas in 2017 and was so moved, that he spontaneously asked for them to come in and join him onstage at the show he was about to play. The group agreed. The response from the crowd that night was overwhelming, according to Gat, and this chance meeting took off from that point into an ongoing collaboration. The group recorded and did a video with Gat as a featured artist on his own solo project and as they began playing at festivals together, they decided to update their name to Medicine Singers and jointly record a full-length album.

=== 2022: Medicine Singers ===
Ryan Olson was recruited as a producer, and a variety of other artists—Ian Wapichana of Wapishana, Joe Rainey Sr. of the Chippewa, Thor Harris of Swans, Jaimie Branch, Laraaji, and Ikue Mori, joined the project.

Medicine Singers was released in July 2022, earning recognition from NPR's All Songs Considered, The New Yorker, Third Man's Maggot Brain, and others in the music press.
