= Eastern Algonquian languages =

Subgroup of the Algonquian languages

Eastern Algonquian
- Eastern Algonkian
- Geographic distribution: Atlantic Coast of North America
- Linguistic classification: Algic: Algonquian; Eastern Algonquian
- Proto-language: Proto-Eastern Algonquian
- Subdivisions: Abenakian? (Abenaki, Etchemin, Maliseet–Passamaquoddy, and Mi'kmaq); Southern New England? (Loup A and B, Massachusett, Mohegan–Pequot, Narragansett, and Quiripi); Delawaran (Delaware and Mohican); Nanticockan? (Nanticoke and Piscataway); Powhatan; Pamlico

Language codes
- Glottolog: east2700
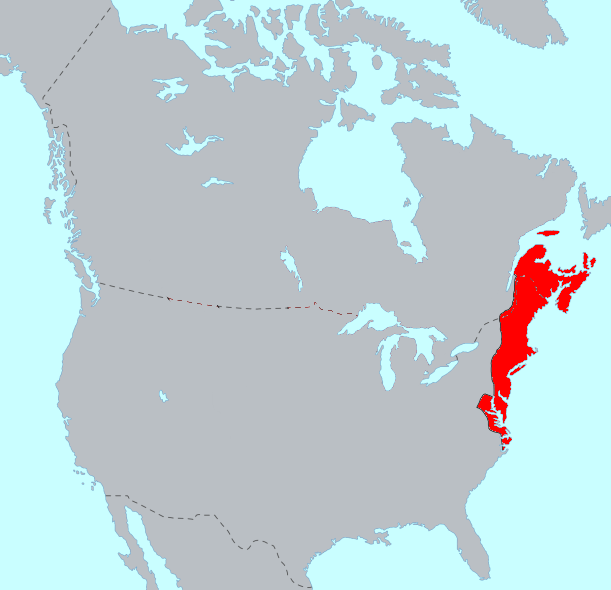

The Eastern Algonquian languages constitute a subgroup of the Algonquian languages. Prior to European contact, Eastern Algonquian consisted of at least 17 languages, whose speakers collectively occupied the Atlantic coast of North America and adjacent inland areas, from what are now the Maritimes of Canada to North Carolina. The available information about individual languages varies widely. Some are known only from one or two documents containing words and phrases collected by missionaries, explorers or settlers, and some documents contain fragmentary evidence about more than one language or dialect. Many of the Eastern Algonquian languages were greatly affected by colonization and dispossession. Miꞌkmaq and Malecite-Passamaquoddy have appreciable numbers of speakers, but Western Abenaki and Lenape (Delaware) are each reported to have fewer than 10 speakers after 2000.

Eastern Algonquian constitutes a separate genetic subgroup within Algonquian. Two other recognized groups of Algonquian languages, Plains Algonquian and Central Algonquian, are geographic but do not refer to genetic subgroupings.

== Classification ==
A consensus classification of the known Eastern Algonquian languages and dialects by Goddard (1996) is given below with some emendation, for example treatment of Massachusett and Narragansett as distinct languages. In the case of poorly attested languages, particularly in southern New England, conclusive classification of written records as representing separate languages or dialects may be ultimately impossible.

- Eastern Algonquian
  - Abenakian
    - Abenaki
      - Eastern Abenaki †
      - Western Abenaki
    - Etchemin (Note: Etchemin is known only from a list of words for numbers taken in 1609 from people living between the St. John and Kennebec rivers by Marc Lescarbot. The numbers in this list share features in common with different Algonquian languages from Massachusetts to New Brunswick, but as a set do not match any other known Algonquian language. Some other materials that have been labelled as Etchemin appear to represent other languages.) †
    - Maliseet–Passamaquoddy
    - Mi'kmaq
  - Carolina Algonquian †
  - Delawaran
    - Delaware
      - Munsee
      - Unami †
    - Mohican †
  - Nanticockan
    - Nanticoke †
    - Piscataway †
  - Powhatan †
  - Southern New England
    - Loup (Note: 'Loup A' is the name given to an otherwise unknown language represented primarily by a single 124-page word list of a language probably spoken in central Massachusetts and nearby areas of northeastern Connecticut and northwestern Rhode Island.The manuscript contains some dialect mixture, and may reflect the language of known tribes in the area such as Nipmuck or Pocumtuck. A more definitive conclusion is not possible.) (Note: 'Loup B' is known only from a 14–page word list that represents a number of different speech varieties. It has some features of Mahican and Western Abenaki but there is no further information available.) †
    - Massachusett (†)
    - Mohegan–Pequot †
    - Narragansett †
    - Quiripi †

The Max Planck Institute for Evolutionary Anthropology classifies the Eastern Algonquian languages within their Glottolog database as follows:

- Eastern Algonquian
  - Carolina Algonquian †
  - Delawaran
    - Common Delaware
      - Munsee
      - Unami †
    - Mahican–Woronoco–Pojassick †
      - Loup B †
      - Mahican †
  - Maritimes–Southern New England Algonquian
    - Northern Eastern Algonquian
      - Abenaki
        - Eastern Abenaki †
        - Western Abenaki
      - Micmacic
        - Malecite–Passamaquoddy
        - Mi'kmaq
    - Southern New England Algonquian †
      - Nipmuck †
      - Wampanoag (†)
      - Western Southern New England Algonquian †
        - Mohegan–Montauk–Narragansett †
        - Wampano †
  - Nanticoke–Conoy †
    - Nanticoke †
    - Piscataway †
  - Powhatan †

== Possible genetic subgroup ==
The languages assigned to the Eastern Algonquian group are hypothesized to descend from an intermediate common ancestor proto-language, referred to as Proto-Eastern Algonquian (PEA). By virtue of their common ancestry, the Eastern Algonquian languages constitute a genetic subgroup, and the individual Eastern Algonquian languages descend from PEA. By contrast, other Algonquian languages are hypothesized to descend directly from Proto-Algonquian, the ultimate common language ancestor of the Algonquian languages.

In historical linguistics in general, the primary criterion for status as a genetic subgroup is that there are shared innovations assigned to the proposed subgroup that cannot be assigned to the ultimate ancestor language. A complex series of phonological and morphological innovations define Eastern Algonquian as a subgroup. "There is less diversity, by any measure, among [Eastern Algonquian languages] as a group than among the Algonquian languages as a whole or among the non-Eastern languages."

The validity of PEA as a genetic subgroup has been disputed by Pentland and Proulx. Pentland questions the Eastern Algonquian status of the southern New England languages and Powhatan and Carolina Algonquian. Proulx has proposed that the similarities can be explained as the result of diffusion. Goddard has countered that the extent of the similarities would require extensive diffusion very early in the breakup of the Eastern Algonquian languages and that such a position would be difficult in principle to differentiate from analyzing PEA as a genetic subgroup.

=== Eastern Algonquian subgroupings ===
Similarities among subsets of some of the Eastern Algonquian languages have led to several proposals for further subgroupings within Eastern Algonquian: Abenakian, Southern New England Algonquian (SNEA), and Delawaran, with the latter consisting of Mahican and Common Delaware, a further subgroup. The amount of evidence for each subgrouping varies, and the incomplete record for many parts of the Eastern Algonquian area makes interpretation of relations between the languages difficult.

As well, diffusion means that some common features may have spread beyond their original starting point through contact, and as a result, a number of characteristics occur in a language assigned to a proposed subgroup, but the same feature is also found in other adjacent languages that are not analyzed as part of the subgroup in question. Appeal to both genetic subgroups and areal diffusion is required. Goddard notes: "Each Eastern Algonquian language shares features with each of its immediate neighbors, and the resulting continuum is of a sort that is likely to have resulted from the spread of linguistic innovations among forms of speech that were already partly differentiated but still similar enough to make partial bilingualism easy."

Proceeding north to south, the languages of the Maritimes and New England are strongly differentiated from those farther south (Mahican, the Delaware languages, Nanticoke, Carolina Algonquian, and Powhatan). At the same time the Southern New England languages (discussed below) share significant similarities, indicating a closer degree of relationship between them.

Micmac has innovated significantly relative to other Eastern Algonquian languages, particularly in terms of grammatical features, but it shares a number of phonological innovations and lexical features with Maliseet-Passamaquoddy and Eastern and Western Abenaki.

==== Abenakian ====
The proposed Abenakian subdivision comprises Eastern and Western Abenaki as well as Maliseet-Passamaquoddy; several phonological innovations are shared by the three languages.

==== Southern New England Algonquian (SNEA) ====
Goddard notes the similarities shared by the Southern New England languages. Siebert made the first explicit proposal for a Southern New England subgroup. Costa develops the proposal in some detail, providing arguments based upon several shared innovations found within SNEA.

Costa, largely following Siebert, proposes that the following languages are assigned to SNEA: Massachusett, Narragansett, Mohegan-Pequot-Montauk (probably also including Western and Niantic), Quiripi-Naugatuck, Unquachog, and Loup A. Etchemin may also have been part of this group but the very small amount of material available precludes a more definitive conclusion. Costa outlines three sound changes that are innovations uniquely assignable to the SNEA, and hence constitute evidence for the subgrouping (the asterisk denotes a reconstructed sound in the proto-language: (a) palatalization of Proto-Eastern-Algonquian (PEA) *k; (b) merger of PEA consonant clusters *hr and *hx; (c) shift of word-final PEA *r to š, all of which occur in Massachusett phonology.

As well, refining a proposal made by Siebert, Costa adduces evidence indicating an east-west split with the SNEA subgroup. On both phonological and lexical grounds, a distinction within SNEA can be made between a Western SNEA group consisting of the languages of central and Eastern Long Island, Connecticut and southern Rhode Island: Mohegan-Pequot-Montauk, Quiripi-Naugatuck, and Unquachog; and an Eastern group consisting of Massachusett and Narragansett. Loup, probably aboriginally found on the northern border of the Western SNEA area and to the west of Massachusett, would appear to share features of the Western and Eastern subgroups.

==== Delawaran and Common Delaware ====
The closely related Lenape (Delaware) languages Munsee and Unami form a subgroup, with the two languages descending from an immediate ancestor called Common Delaware (CD). Goddard notes a small number of innovations in morphology and phonology that set Munsee and Unami off from their neighbours. As well, similarities between the Delaware languages and Mahican have been recognized in that Mahican shares innovations with Munsee and Unami, suggesting a subgroup containing Common Delaware and Mahican; this group has been referred to as Delawaran.

== Preservation and revival ==
Efforts to preserve and revive the Eastern Algonquian language and culture are being undertaken by a group called the Medicine Singers (aka 'Eastern Medicine Singers') in cooperation with a number of kindred tribes and tribal members, the Pocasset Pokanoket Land Trust (partly administered by Darryl Jamieson), theater and educational company Atelier Jaku, record labels Joyful Noise Recordings and Stone Tapes, and producer Yonatan Gat (founder and curator of Stone Tapes). The labor involved in this endeavor includes educational symposia, storytelling presentations, traditional ceremonies, and especially the production and performance of music with lyrics written and sung in Eastern Algonquian.

The inaugural album by the Medicine Singers is called Daybreak.

== See also ==
- Algonquian languages
- Algonquian peoples
- Proto-Algonquian language
