= Ojibwe phonology =

The phonology of the Ojibwe language (also Ojibwa, Ojibway, or Chippewa, and most commonly referred to in the language as Anishinaabemowin) varies from dialect to dialect, but all varieties share common features. Ojibwe is an indigenous language of the Algonquian language family spoken in Canada and the United States in the areas surrounding the Great Lakes, and westward onto the northern plains in both countries, as well as in northeastern Ontario and northwestern Quebec. The article on Ojibwe dialects discusses linguistic variation in more detail, and contains links to separate articles on each dialect. There is no standard language and no dialect that is accepted as representing a standard. Ojibwe words in this article are written in the practical orthography commonly known as the Double vowel system.

Ojibwe dialects have the same phonological inventory of vowels and consonants with minor variations, but some dialects differ considerably along a number of phonological parameters. For example, the Ottawa and Eastern Ojibwe dialects have changed relative to other dialects by adding a process of vowel syncope that deletes short vowels in specified positions within a word.

This article primarily uses examples from the Southwestern Ojibwe dialect spoken in Minnesota and Wisconsin, sometimes also known as Ojibwemowin.

== Phonemes ==
Ojibwe dialects tend to have 29 phonemes: 11 vowels (seven oral and four nasal) and 18 consonants.

=== Vowels ===
All dialects of Ojibwe have seven oral vowels. Vowel length is phonologically contrastive, hence phonemic. Although the long and short vowels are phonetically distinguished by vowel quality, recognition of vowel length in phonological representations is required, as the distinction between long and short vowels is essential for the operation of the metrical rule of vowel syncope that characterizes the Ottawa and Eastern Ojibwe dialects, as well as for the rules that determine word stress. There are three short vowels, /i a o/; and three corresponding long vowels, /iː aː oː/, in addition to a fourth long vowel /eː/, which lacks a corresponding short vowel. The short vowel /i/ typically has phonetic values centering on [ɪ]; /a/ typically has values centering on [ə]~[ʌ]; and /o/ typically has values centering on [o]~[ʊ]. Long /oː/ is pronounced [uː] for many speakers, and /eː/ is for many [ɛː].

vowel	stressed	unstressed
/a/	ɑ a ɐ ɔ ʌ ɨ	ə~ʌ a ɨ ɔ
/aa/	ɑː aː	
/e/	eː~ɛː æː	
/i/	i ɪ ɨ	ɨ ə ɪ ɛ
/ii/	iː ɪː	
/o/	o~ʊ ɔ	o ɨ ə ʊ
/oo/	oː~uː ʊː	

but more generally as

Oral Vowels
	Front	Central	Back	
Close	iː			oː~uː
Near-Close	ɪ		o~ʊ	oː~uː
Mid	eː	ə	o~ʊ	oː~uː
Open		aː		

Ojibwe has a series of three short oral vowels and four long ones. The two series are characterized by both length and quality differences. The short vowels are /ɪ o ə/ (roughly the vowels in American English bit, bot, and but, respectively) and the long vowels are /iː oː aː eː/ (roughly as in American English beet, boat, ball, and bay respectively). In the Minnesota variety of Southwestern Ojibwe language, /o/ varies between [o] and [ʊ] and /oo/ varies between [oː] and [uː]. /eː/ also may be pronounced [ɛː] and /ə/ as [ʌ].

Nasal Vowels
	Front	Central	back
Close	ĩː		õː~ũː
Mid	ẽː		õː~ũː
Open		ãː	

Ojibwe has nasal vowels; some arise predictably by rule in all analyses, and other long nasal vowels are of uncertain phonological status. The latter have been analysed both as underlying phonemes, and also as predictable, that is derived by the operation of phonological rules from sequences of a long vowel followed by /n/ and another segment, typically /j/.

The long nasal vowels are iinh ([ĩː]), enh ([ẽː]), aanh ([ãː]), and oonh ([õː]). They most commonly occur in the final syllable of nouns with diminutive suffixes or words with a diminutive connotation. In the Ottawa dialect long nasal aanh ([ãː]) occurs as well as in the suffix (y)aanh ([-(j)ãː]) marking the first person (conjunct) animate intransitive. Typical examples from Southwestern Ojibwe include: -iijikiwenh- ('brother'), -noshenh- ('cross-aunt'), -oozhishenh- ('grandchild') bineshiinh ('bird'), asabikeshiinh ('spider'), and awesiinh ('wild animal').

Orthographically the long vowel is followed by word-final ⟨nh⟩ to indicate that the vowel is nasal; while ⟨n⟩ is a common indicator of nasality in many languages such as French, the use of ⟨h⟩ is an orthographic convention and does not correspond to an independent sound.

One analysis of the Ottawa dialect treats the long nasal vowels as phonemic, while another treats them as derived from sequences of long vowel followed by /n/ and underlying /h/; the latter sound is converted to [ʔ] or deleted. Other discussions of the issue in Ottawa are silent on the issue.

A study of the Southwestern Ojibwe (Chippewa) dialect spoken in Minnesota describes the status of the analogous vowels as unclear, noting that while the distribution of the long nasal vowels is restricted, there is a minimal pair distinguished only by the nasality of the vowel: giiwe [ɡiːweː] ('he goes home') and giiwenh [ɡiːwẽː] ('so the story goes').

Nasalized allophones of the short vowels also exist. The nasal allophones of oral vowels are derived from a short vowel followed by a nasal+fricative cluster (for example, imbanz, 'I'm singed') is [ɪmbə̃z]). For many speakers, the nasal allophones appear not only before nasal+fricative clusters, but also before all fricatives, particularly if the vowel is preceded by another nasal. E.g., for some speakers, waabooz, ('rabbit') is pronounced [waːbõːz], and for many, mooz, ('moose') is pronounced [mõːz].

=== Consonants ===
		Bilabial	Alveolar	Postalveolar and palatal	Velar	Glottal
Nasals		m ⟨m⟩	n ⟨n⟩			
Plosives and affricates	fortis	pʰ ⟨p⟩	tʰ ⟨t⟩	tʃʰ ⟨ch⟩	kʰ ⟨k⟩	ʔ ⟨’⟩
Plosives and affricates	lenis	p ~ b ⟨b⟩	t ~ d ⟨d⟩	tʃ ~ dʒ ⟨j⟩	k ~ ɡ ⟨g⟩	ʔ ⟨’⟩
Fricative	fortis		sʰ ⟨s⟩	ʃʰ ⟨sh⟩		
Fricative	lenis		s ~ z ⟨z⟩	ʃ ~ ʒ ⟨zh⟩		(h ⟨h⟩)
Approximants				j ⟨y⟩	w ⟨w⟩	

The "voiced/voiceless" obstruent pairs of Ojibwe vary in their realization depending on the dialect. In many dialects, they are described as having a "lenis/fortis" contrast. In this analysis, all obstruents are considered voiceless. The fortis consonants are characterised by being pronounced more strongly and are longer in duration. They often are aspirated or preaspirated. The lenis consonants are often voiced, especially between vowels, although they often tend to be voiceless at the end of words. They are pronounced less strongly and are shorter in duration, compared to the fortis ones. In some communities, the lenis/fortis distinction has been replaced with a pure voiced/voiceless one.

In some dialects of Saulteaux (Plains Ojibwe), the sounds of ⟨sh⟩ and ⟨zh⟩ have merged with ⟨s⟩ and ⟨z⟩ respectively. This means that, for example, Southwestern Ojibwe wazhashk, ('muskrat') is pronounced the same as wazask in some dialects of Saulteaux. This merging creates additional consonant clusters of /sp/ and /st/ in addition to /sk/ common in all Anishinaabe dialects.

/n/ before velars becomes [ŋ].

The glottal fricative /h/ occurs infrequently in most dialects, only appearing in a handful of expressive words and interjections, but in a few dialects it has taken the place of /ʔ/.

== Phonotactics ==
Ojibwe in general permits relatively few consonant clusters, and most are only found word-medially. The permissible ones are -sk-, -shp-, -sht-, -shk- (which can also appear word-finally), -mb-, -nd- (which can also appear word-finally), -ng- (also word-finally), -nj- (also word-finally), -nz-, -nzh- (also word-finally) and -ns- (also word-finally). Furthermore, any consonant (except w, h, or y) and some clusters can be followed by w (although not word-finally). Many dialects, however, permit far more clusters as a result of vowel syncope.

== Prosody ==
Ojibwe divides words into metrical "feet." Counting from the beginning of the word, each group of two syllables constitutes a foot; the first syllable in a foot is weak, the second strong. However, long vowels and vowels in the last syllable of a word are always strong, so if they occur in the weak slot of a foot, then they form a separate one-syllable foot, and counting resumes starting with the following vowel. The final syllable of a word is always strong as well. For example, the word bebezhigooganzhii ('horse') is divided into feet as (be)(be)(zhi-goo)(gan-zhii). The strong syllables all receive at least secondary stress. The rules that determine which syllable receives the primary stress are quite complex and many words are irregular. In general, though, the strong syllable in the third foot from the end of a word receives the primary stress.

== Phonological processes ==
A defining characteristic of several of the more eastern dialects is that they exhibit a great deal of vowel syncope, the deletion of vowels in certain positions within a word. In some dialects (primarily Odawa and Eastern Ojibwe), all unstressed vowels are lost (see above for a discussion of Ojibwe stress). In other dialects (such as some dialects of Central Ojibwe), short vowels in initial syllables are lost, but not in other unstressed syllables. For example, the word oshkinawe ('young man') of Algonquin and Southwestern Ojibwe (stress: oshkinawe) is shkinawe in some dialects of Central Ojibwe and shkinwe in Eastern Ojibwe and Odawa. Regular, pervasive syncope is a comparatively recent development, arising in the past eighty years or so.

A common morphophonemic variation occurs in some verbs whose roots end in -n. When the root is followed by certain suffixes beginning with i or when it is word-final, the root-final -n changes to -zh (e.g., -miin-, 'to give something to someone' but gimiizhim, 'you guys give it to me'). In Ojibwe linguistics, this is indicated when writing the root with the symbol ⟨N⟩ (so the root 'to give something to someone' would be written ⟨miiN⟩). There are also some morphophonemic alternations where root-final -s changes to -sh (indicated with ⟨S⟩) and where root-final -n changes to -nzh (indicated with ⟨nN⟩).

In some dialects, obstruents become voiceless/fortis after the tense preverbs gii- (marking the past) and wii- (marking the future/desiderative). In such dialects, for example, gii-baapi ([ɡiː baːpːɪ]) ('s/he laughed') becomes [ɡiː pːaːpːɪ] (often spelled gii-paapi).

== Historical phonology ==
In the evolution from Proto-Algonquian to Ojibwe, the most sweeping change was the voicing of all Proto-Algonquian voiceless obstruents except when they were in clusters with *h, *ʔ, *θ, or *s (which were subsequently lost). Proto-Algonquian *r and *θ became Ojibwe /n/.

The relatively symmetrical Proto-Algonquian vowel system, *i, *i·, *e, *e·, *a, *a·, *o, *o· remained fairly intact in Ojibwe, although *e and *i merged as /ɪ/, and the short vowels, as described above, underwent a quality change as well.

Some examples of the changes at work are presented in the table below:

Proto-Algonquian	Ojibwe reflex (Saulteaux)	Ojibwe reflex (Fiero)	Gloss
*penkwi	pinkwi	bingwi	'ashes'
*mekiθe·wa	mikiš	migizh	'to bark at'
*ši·ʔši·pa	šîhšîp	zhiishiib	'duck'
*askyi	ahki	aki	'earth'
*-te·h-	-têh-	-de'-	'heart' (root)
*erenyiwa	inini	inini	'man'
*wespwa·kana	ohpwâkan	opwaagan	'pipe'

For illustrative purposes, chart of phonological variation between different Cree dialects of Proto-Algonquian *r have been reproduced here but for the Anishinaabe languages, with the inclusion of Swampy Cree and Atikamekw for illustrative purposes only, with corresponding Cree orthography in parentheses:

Dialect	Location	Reflex of *r	Word for "Native person(s)" ← *erenyiwa(ki)	Word for "You" ← *kīrawa
Swampy Cree	ON, MB, SK	n	ininiw/ininiwak ᐃᓂᓂᐤ/ᐃᓂᓂᐗᒃ	kīna ᑮᓇ
Atikamekw	QC	r	iriniw/iriniwak	kīr
Algonquin	QC, ON	n	irini/irinìk inini/ininìk ᐃᓂᓂ/ᐃᓂᓃᒃ (inini/ininīk)	kìn ᑮᓐ (kīn)
Oji-Cree	ON, MB	n	inini/ininiwak ᐃᓂᓂ/ᐃᓂᓂᐗᒃ	kīn ᑮᓐ
Ojibwe	ON, MB, SK, AB, BC, MI, WI, MN, ND, SD, MT	n	inini/ininiwag ᐃᓂᓂ/ᐃᓂᓂᐗᒃ (inini/ininiwak)	giin ᑮᓐ (kīn)
Ottawa	ON, MI, OK	n	nini/ninwag (nini/ninwak)	gii (kī)
Potawatomi	ON, WI, MI, IN, KS, OK	n	neni/nenwek (nəni/nənwək)	gin (kīn)

== See also ==
- Anishinaabe language – Central Algonquian language of North America
- Glyne Piggott – Canadian linguist
- Massachusett phonology
- Proto-Algonquian language – Reconstructed ancestor of the Algonquian languages
