= Yonatan Gat =

Israeli American musician

Yonatan Gat יונתן גת
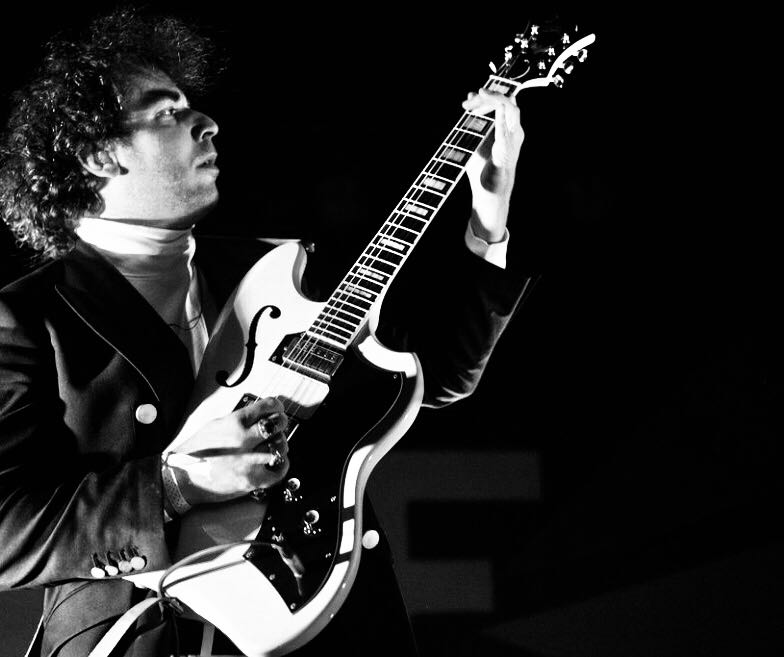
- Gat performing in 2018

Background information
- Genres: Punk rock; psychedelic rock; improvisation; avant garde; free jazz; world music
- Instruments: Guitar; bass; piano; organ; drums; percussion; vocals
- Years active: 2006–present
- Labels: Joyful Noise; Drag City; Stone Tapes
- Member of: Medicine Singers
- Formerly of: Monotonix
- Website: yonatangat.com

Yonatan Gat (Hebrew: יונתן גת) is an Israeli American producer, guitarist, and composer based in New York City. His cross-genre work has been called "a vital new music form" by a "legendary live performer" by Magnet magazine, "melding punk, improvisation, world music, and avant garde".

His performances were so controversial in his home country that his first band, Monotonix, got banned from playing shows in almost all venues of the country, leading Gat—a conscientious objector to Israel's mandatory military service—to leave Israel for a decade of touring, during which he gave 1,500 concerts in thirty countries. Rolling Stone editor David Fricke celebrated the multiculturalism of Gat's sound, calling him "a citizen of the world", adding that "Gat wields his guitar like a universal translator".

After variously relocating to Paris, Porto, and New Orleans, Gat found a home in New York, where his work has been profiled by The New York Times, Rolling Stone, The Wire, UNCUT, Pitchfork, NPR, Vice, The New Yorker, and People. The Village Voice named him "Best Guitarist in New York, 2013", and The Guardian listed his sophomore album, Universalists, in their top ten Contemporary Classical Music albums of 2018. PopMatters called it a "Visionary New Album for Rock Music, rearranged electronically in unpredictable ways that suggest Teo Macero, DJ Screw, Yeezus-era Kanye West, but not much else in rock music".

== Career ==
=== Monotonix (2000s) ===
Gat first came to prominence as the guitarist and founder of the punk band Monotonix. After finding themselves banned from most venues in their country due to the wild and controversial nature of their concerts, the band decided to leave Israel and tour the United States and Europe. With Monotonix, Gat released an EP and two albums on Drag City Records. Gat's guitar was the only harmonic instrument in the drums-guitar-vocals trio and was singled out by the likes of Pitchfork, who wrote: "guitarist Yonatan Gat slides in and out of solos without ever throwing the rhythm off the rails... The descending guitar line that follows is sweet and yearning enough to fit onto a damn Strokes record."

During the band's five-year existence, they played 1,000 concerts, collaborated with musicians such as Fugazi's Ian Mackaye and Guy Picciotto and Beat Happening and K Records founder Calvin Johnson, while touring as support for Pavement, Faith No More, and Silver Jews. The latter's frontman, David Berman, would go on to co-produce Gat's 2018 sophomore album, Universalists. Songs by Monotonix were used in TV, film, and video games such as House, Grand Theft Auto, and Better Living Through Chemistry. In 2008, Monotonix were called "the most exciting live band in rock 'n' roll" by Spin magazine. By 2011, after completing a world tour for their final album, Not Yet, the band stopped touring, allowing Gat to focus on his career as a solo artist.

=== Solo career ===
After Monotonix's final world tour in 2011, Gat went on to earn a bachelor of arts in anthropology from Columbia University. Soon after, Gat settled in New York City and began recording and performing as a bandleader and solo artist, engaging Gal Lazer (drums) and Sergio Sayeg (bass) as his core studio collaborators, while expanding his projects into collaborations with musicians such as Medicine Singers, Lee Ranaldo, Laraaji, Brian Chase (Yeah Yeah Yeahs), Jaimie Branch, Ikue Mori, and Thor Harris (Swans).

Gat began touring the United States and Europe both as headliner and sharing the stage with artists such as Thee Oh Sees and Sun Ra Arkestra, often performing his set on the floor in the middle of the audience. He released his debut EP, Iberian Passage, written and recorded while he was living in Portugal, in the spring of 2014 on Joyful Noise Recordings. His full-length studio album debut, Director, followed in 2015. Within months of Director's premiere, an EP produced by Steve Albini, titled Physical Copy, followed.

Gat's second album, Universalists, was released through Joyful Noise on 4 May 2018. In that same year, the artist went on to release a split 7-inch with Os Mutantes, was featured as guest guitarist on the Nigerien band Tal National's new album, and premiered a collaboration with a Rhode Island Algonquin powwow drum ensemble—Eastern Medicine Singers. The album's release was followed by a world tour, featuring an eight-piece band, which included members of his own ensemble of longtime collaborators playing alongside the Indigenous American drummers and singers of Eastern Medicine Singers, a project that later developed into the collective Medicine Singers. Gat's third solo album, which featured Greg Saunier (Deerhoof) on drums, was his reinterpretation of Antonín Dvořák's American String Quartet, substituting the string quartet's two violins, viola, and cello with electric guitar, bass guitar, electric organ, and drums.

== Discography ==
=== As producer/collaborator ===
- Medicine Singers (2022)
- Maalem & Gat (2022)
- Mamady Kouyaté – Proclamation (2022)
- Medicine Singers, Lee Ranaldo & Yonatan Gat – "Honor Song" (single) (2023)

=== with Monotonix ===
- Body Language EP (2008)
- Where Were You When It Happened? (2009)
- Not Yet (2011)

=== Solo ===
Studio albums

- Director (2015)
- Universalists (2018)
- American Quartet (2022)

EPs

- Iberian Passage (2014)
- Physical Copy (2015)
