= Universalists (album) =

Studio album by Yonatan Gat
- Released: 2018
- Genres: Punk rock; improvisation; avant garde; free jazz; psychedelic rock
- Length: 33:07
- Label: Joyful Noise Recordings
- Producers: Yonatan Gat; David Berman

Yonatan Gat chronology
Director (2015)	Universalists (2018)

Universalists is the second full-length studio album by Yonatan Gat released in 2018 on Joyful Noise Recordings. Gal Lazer plays drums, and Sergio Sayeg is on bass. The album was produced by David Berman of the Silver Jews and by Gat himself. Other personnel involved with the album's production included Kevin McMahon, Calvin Johnson (Beat Happening), Thor Harris (Swans) and many others. Several of the tracks sample Alan Lomax's European field recording from the 1950s.

The album is noted for its advanced editing techniques and global musical perspective, with Spin describing it as: "an ambitious, sprawling record, a catalog of fever dreams, where styles and sounds dovetail in transparent sheafs of blotter paper...."

The album takes its cues from the editing techniques of Teo Macero (Miles Davis' producer). Kanye West's style of editing and sampling on Yeezus and the Life of Pablo were also particularly influential to Gat's approach on Universalists.

The music video for "Medicine" was inspired by the visual style of Jean Rouche, a French Documentary Film-Maker.

At Metacritic, which assigns a normalized rating out of 100 to reviews from mainstream publications, Universalists received an average score of 81, based on 6 reviews, indicating "universal acclaim".

== Track listing ==
1. Cue the Machines - 3:05
2. Post-World - 1:22
3. Fading Casino - 2:51
4. Cockfight - 2:24
5. Medicine - 4:55
6. Projections - 2:14
7. Sightseer - 3:52
8. Dream Sequence - 2:58
9. Chronology - 6:38
10. The Imaginary - 2:48
