= Monotonix =

Israeli rock band

Background information
- Origin: Tel Aviv, Israel
- Genres: Garage rock; indie rock; noise rock
- Years active: 2005–2011
- Labels: Drag City
- Past members: Ami Shalev; Yonatan Gat; Haggai Fershtman; Ran Shimoni

Monotonix were a garage rock band from Tel Aviv, Israel. The group—singer Ami Shalev, guitarist Yonatan Gat, and drummer Ran Shimoni (later replaced by Haggai Fershtman)—released their debut EP in 2008 and toured mostly in the United States and Europe, including notable appearances at SXSW. Monotonix subsequently released two full-length records: Where Were You When It Happened? and Not Yet. Over the span of five years (ending in 2011 with the breakup of the band), Monotonix played 1000 shows. They were famously dubbed, "the most exciting live band in rock 'n' roll" by Spin Magazine. The band is also noted as guitarist and co-founder Yonatan Gat's first band.

== History ==
Dissatisfied with the state of the music scene in their hometown of Tel Aviv, the Israeli trio Monotonix formed in November 2005. They began by playing shows at local venues. They frequently set up on the floor among the crowd, playing shows raucous enough to result in the power being shut off or the police called in.

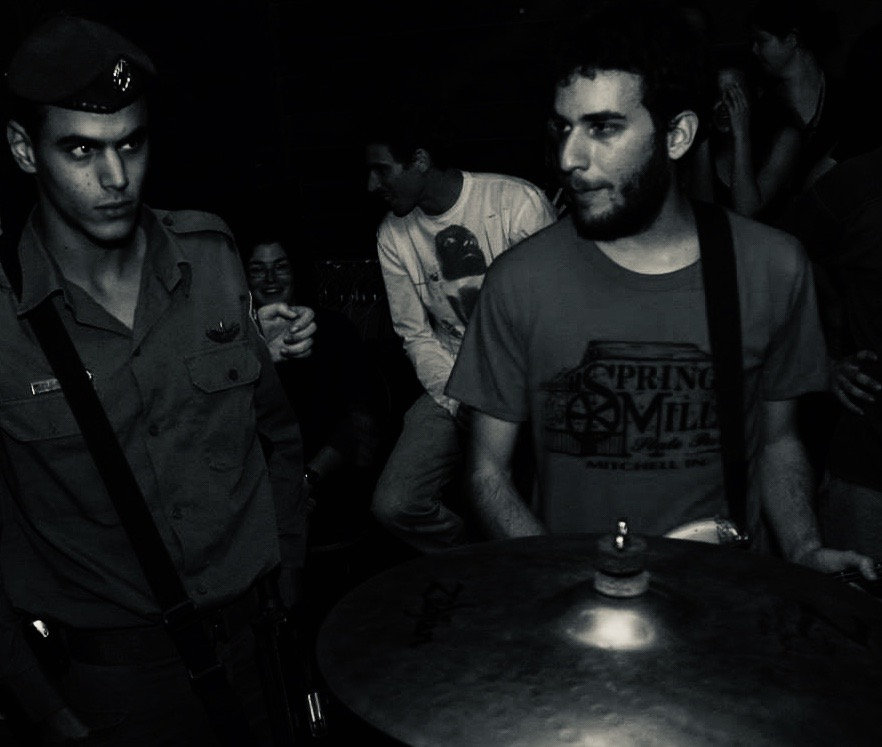
Yonatan Gat with Monotonix, 2006

Eventually, finding themselves banned from most of the venues in Tel Aviv, the band decided to leave Israel and tour the United States and Europe. In 2006 and 2007, Monotonix played over 300 shows around the world, including appearances at festivals in the US and Europe, and a few tours with Silver Jews, for whom they opened in Israel and befriended. Monotonix were known for setting themselves and their equipment on fire and turning their shows into frenzied dance parties. Film director Harmony Korine wrote Monotonix shows "incorporated extreme theatre and spectacle."

In 2008, the band signed to Drag City and released Body Language. The track was recorded by Tim Green of the Fucking Champs. They never let up on their nonstop touring though, playing over 250 shows that year alone.

Where Were You When It Happened, 2009. (Drag City)

On September 1, 2009, having recently released their first full length, Where Were You When It Happened, they opened (along with Dinosaur Jr.) for the reunited Faith No More at a sold-out concert at the Israel Trade Fairs & Convention Center in Tel Aviv, Israel, and followed that show with tours in the US, Canada, Europe and Australia. "Set Me Free" from Where Were You When It Happened was used in the opening scene of an episode of cult TV show House.

In 2009, their song "Body Language" was featured on the video game Grand Theft Auto: The Lost and Damned and on Episodes from Liberty City on the fictional indie radio station Radio Broker.

In 2009, their song "Set Me Free" was the music over the opening parkour scene in "House M.D." (Brave Heart episode (06), season 06).

In January 2010, while performing in Florida, singer Ami Shalev broke his leg, leading the band to cancel one subsequent show in Athens, Georgia. The rest of the tour continued in equal manic energy with Shalev sometimes singing while atop venue bars on crutches.

Between tours that year, the band rented a studio space in the center of Tel Aviv and wrote the 10 songs that would appear on their next album. It was recorded at Electrical Audio in Chicago with engineer Steve Albini. Two 7-inch releases of these sessions came out in April and June 2010, serving as the appetizer for the band's second full length, Not Yet, which was released on January 25, 2011.

During their US tour supporting Not Yet the band announced multiple times that the tour would be their last, first in Echoplex in Los Angeles, and afterward in sold out shows in San Francisco and New York City. The US tour was followed by a final tour of Europe. March 6, 2011, the band's final concert took place in London and became 15 minutes of complete chaos which completely destroyed the band's equipment and got shut down by the venue, ending with the band gifting their remaining tour merchandise and equipment to the audience. Shalev and Fershtman returned to Israel the next day, while Gat stayed in Europe and eventually would move to New York.

On March 25, 2011, the band posted a picture in a post on their Myspace blog showing a sign saying "The End" above the band's name. The post was titled "THANK YOU!".

In 2014, band founder and guitarist Yonatan Gat released the Iberian Passage EP under his own name. The album was recorded by Yonatan himself in Portugal with Portuguese drummer Igor Domingues. He followed it up with Director a year later, and embarked on extensive tours of the United States and Europe. Steve Albini produced an EP for Gat the same year titled Physical Copy. Gat released his second full-length album on Joyful Noise Recordings, Universalists, in 2018.

== Discography ==
- Body Language EP (2008)
- Where Were You When It Happened? (2009)
- Not Yet (2011)

7-inch releases

- Ride (Split 7" with RTX – 2008)
- Never Died Before / Lazy Boy (2010)
- Fun Fun Fun / Try Try Try (2010)
