= Anni Rossi =

American singer (born c. 1986)

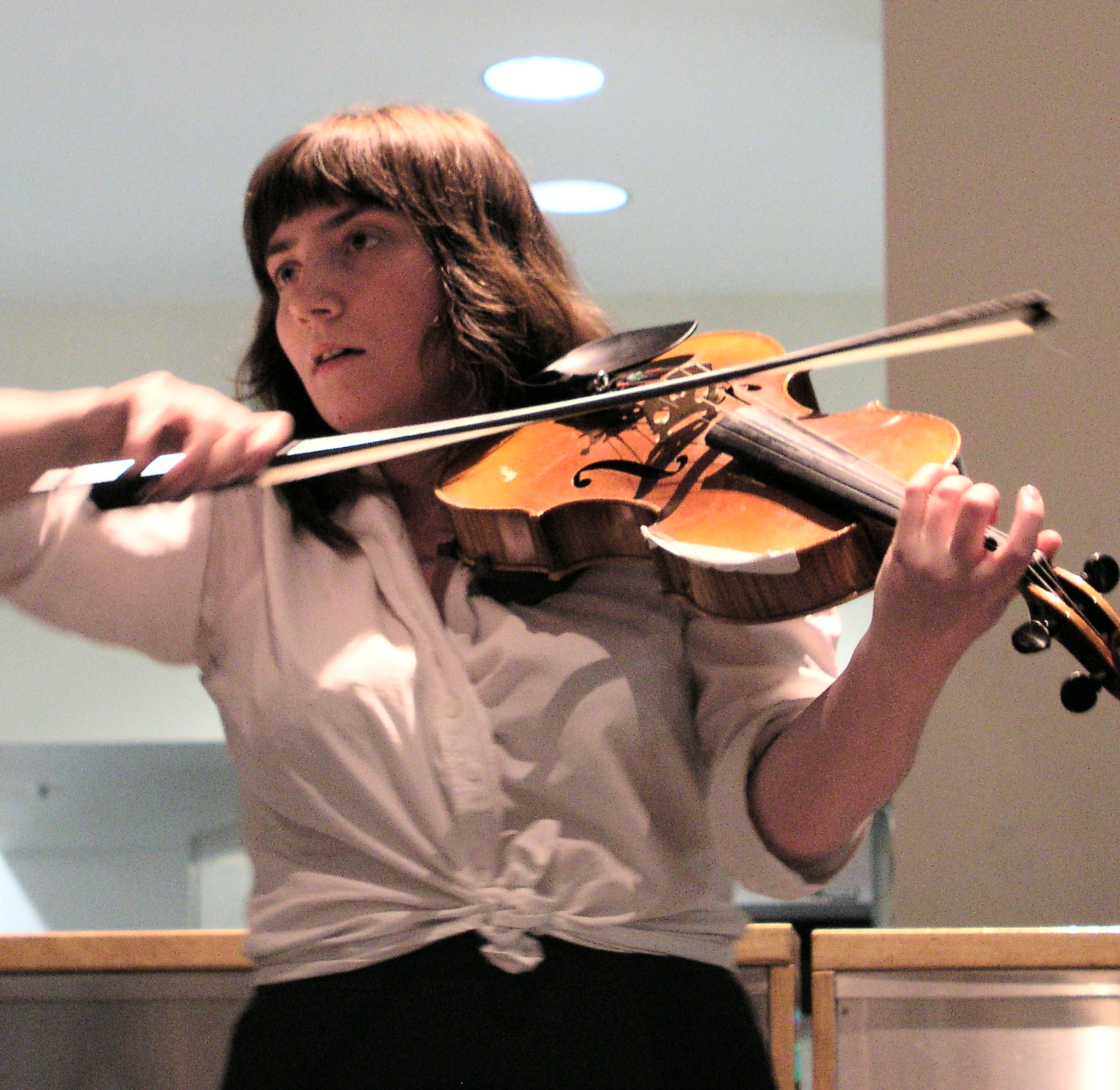
- Anni Rossi in 2009

Background information
- Instruments: Vocals, viola, keyboards
- Labels: 4AD, 3 Syllables Too Pure

Anni Rossi is an American singer, songwriter and producer from Minnesota. She plays an electric-viola that was handcrafted from a tree branch by former Swans percussionist Thor Harris. Rossi adopts modern guitar and bass techniques and applies them to this instrument, as well as traditional viola styles. In recent years her music has evolved to incorporate elements of R&B and electronic music.

== Early life ==
Rossi spent most of her childhood living in rural farming towns throughout the American Midwest. At age 4 she began violin lessons and around age 5 or 6 she started learning to play classical piano. Her first public performance was in church with her grandmother, who was a church organist in Marine on St Croix, Minnesota.

Rossi attended the Perpich Center for Arts Education in Golden Valley and graduated in 2004. She went on to study performance and composition at California Institute of the Arts (CalArts) alongside Julia Holter, John Maus and Ariel Pink. After leaving CalArts, Rossi relocated to Chicago and became a member of L.A. artist Carla Bozulich's touring band.

Rossi teaches piano, violin and vocal training in Williamsburg, Brooklyn. She also hosts workshops and mini songwriting camps, called ‘Rhymes’, and has been a guest lecturer at Brown University and Montclair State University speaking about her creative process.

== Career ==
Anni Rossi's debut album, Scandia, was released in 2005 by Folktale Records. It was recorded at various locations in Los Angeles while Rossi was attending CalArts. John Wood of The Black Keys played organ and performance artist Corey Fogel played drums on the record. The album is named after Scandia, the city in Washington County, Minnesota where Rossi lived during her high school years.

After touring with Electrelane in 2007, Rossi was signed to London independent record label Too Pure, who released her 7” single "Wheelpusher". This was followed by a six track EP titled Afton, consisting of reworked versions of previously released tracks, including MySpace previews and the 7" single "Wheelpusher". Afton was released in October 2008 through 4AD Records. The majority of Afton was recorded at Bomb Shelter Studios in Los Angeles by Ben Tierney.

Rossi recorded her debut album Rockwell with Steve Albini at Electrical Audio in Chicago. The album was released in March 2009 through 4AD Records. The album is named after Rockwell Street in Chicago, where Rossi was living at the time. Rockwell includes a cover of Ace of Bases’ "Living In Danger".

An appearance at the South by Southwest (SXSW) music festival and a west coast tour followed in late winter/early spring of 2009. Later that year Rossi toured with Noah and the Whale, Camera Obscura, the Ting Tings and Micachu and the Shapes. Rossi later wrote an essay about her love of Micachu and the Shapes for BOMB magazine.

Rossi's second album, Heavy Meadow, was initially self-released in September 2010, and was later released in May 2011 via UK label 3 Syllables. The song “Land Majestic” later featured in Episode 56 (season 3 episode 6) of the American crime drama The Good Wife. “Crushing Limbs” featured in Episode 6 of UK comedy series Sirens.

On March 5, 2011, MTV Hive posted a streaming link to Anni Rossi performing Rihanna's "Rude Boy". The recording later featured in season 12, episode 1 of the American medical drama Grey's Anatomy.

After a six-year absence, Rossi released a mixtape of RnB demos, voice recordings and prank phone calls titled HER. It was self-released on April 1, 2017. Several songs were composed after it was suggested Rossi write music for former Destiny's Child member Kelly Rowland. The songs were never used by Rowland and instead became the foundation of Rossi's experimental mixtape. “H.O.R. Remix” is used as the theme song for writer Chelsea Beck's Ménage à Mo podcast.

In October 2017, Rossi was a guest speaker and performer at the Monthly Music Hackathon NYC hosted by Spotify. Her talk was tilted ‘Log Lady: Re-wilding the viola as an electric guitar'.

== Collaborations ==
In 2007, Rossi released a CDr with Canadian multi-instrumentalist Ora Cogan. The two track CDr, titled Peep Creek, was housed in packaging fashioned out of recycled LP jackets, sheets of fancy paper and gold star confetti.

In 2009, Folktale Records released Anni Rossi & Whitman, a collaboration between Rossi and Los Angeles artist and Folktale Records founder Chris Payne. It was released as a pressing of 500 10-inch records (300 on black vinyl and 200 on burgundy vinyl).

In 2013, Rossi collaborated with anthropologist Michael Taussig for his theater piece titled "The Berlin Sun Theater". Rossi is credited as a composer and performer of the piece. The work premiered at The Whitney Museum on Feb 23, 2013. Later that year Taussig and Rossi performed the work at Berlin's Haus der Kulturen der Welt, and in October 2014 they performed the work at Brown University.

Rossi offers the female voice for the majority of Simon Doom's record "Babyman", which was released on May 19, 2017.

In 2017, Rossi produced Alex Rose's record ‘Arcadian Pages’ at Dandy Sounds Studio in Dripping Springs, TX.

Rossi plays with Molly Klauber, Molly Shea, Sam Mason and MGMT’s Will Berman and James Richardson in the band Acrylics.

== Discography ==
Albums:

- Rockwell (2009)
- Heavy Meadow (2011)

EPs:

- Scandia (2005)
- My Grandmother Was A Church Organist (2007 limited edition tape only)
- Afton (2008)

Mixtapes:

- HER (2017)
- Yultide x Rossi (2017)

Collaborations:

- Peep Creek (2007)
- Anni Rossi & Whitman (2009)
- With Anni Rossi (2019, Shahzad & Thor (Shahzad Ismaily & Thor Harris), on Joyful Noise Recordings)

== Awards ==
Independent Music Awards 2012: "Crushing Limbs" - Best Film/TV Song
