= Shearwater (band) =

American indie rock band

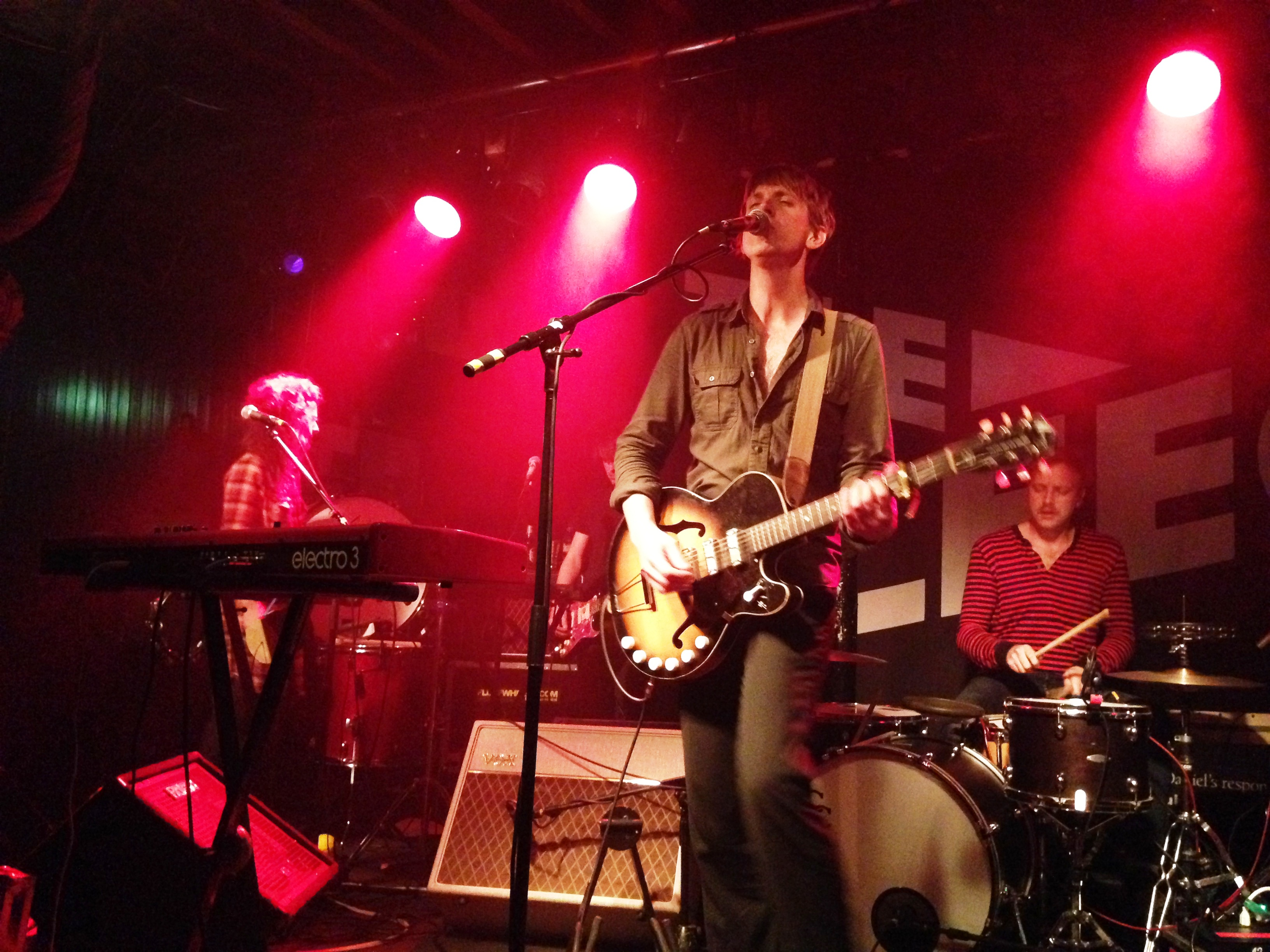
- Shearwater in 2014

Background information
- Origin: Austin, Texas, U.S.
- Genres: Indie rock, psychedelic folk, folk rock
- Years active: 1999–present
- Labels: Misra, Matador, Sub Pop
- Members: Jonathan Meiburg; Lucas Oswald; Emily Lee; Sadie Powers; Josh Halpern
- Past members: Kimberly Burke; Thor Harris; Will Sheff; Christiaan Mader; Mitch Billeaud; Howard Draper; Adam Cormack; Jordan Geiger; Kevin Schneider; Danny Reisch; Abram Shook; Jesca Hoop
- Website: shearwatermusic.com

Shearwater is an American indie rock band from Austin, Texas, led by multi-instrumentalist and lead singer Jonathan Meiburg, a singer-songwriter. The band's music is notable for its imagery based in nature, cerebral yet intimate melodic songs, as well as Meiburg's vocals.

== History ==
=== Early years ===
In 1999, Okkervil River band members Jonathan Meiburg and Will Sheff founded Shearwater as an outlet for quieter songs on which they were collaborating. The band's name comes from the shearwater, a tribe of seabirds related to petrels and albatrosses. Meiburg, who holds a master's degree in geography with a focus on ornithology, picked the name mostly for the sound of the word.

Shearwater's debut, The Dissolving Room, introduced Kim Burke on upright bass; shortly after, drummer and vibraphonist Thor Harris joined the band. The addition of multi-instrumentalist Howard Draper plus tours and support dates with The Mountain Goats, Akron/Family and Blonde Redhead brought them exposure. Shearwater continued to produce music under this lineup in Everybody Makes Mistakes (2002) and Winged Life (2004), as well as the Thieves EP (2005).

In May 2006, Shearwater released Palo Santo, their fourth full-length album and last to be released on Misra Records, to much acclaim from critics and fans. The song "Red Sea, Black Sea," was featured as an NPR Song of the Day. NPR's Stephen Thompson subsequently named Palo Santo as the best album of 2006. Although Sheff appeared as an instrumentalist for the recording of Palo Santo, the album's songs were composed and sung entirely by Meiburg, as the band felt that the songs that Meiburg had written were best suited for the project. Sheff then left the band to concentrate on other projects.

=== Matador Records ===
Midway through the tour for Palo Santo, the band was notified by Misra Records that they would be unable to continue to distribute Shearwater's music. Meiburg personally emailed the owner of Matador Records, Gerard Cosloy, who subsequently signed Shearwater to a multi-album deal. On April 10, 2007, Shearwater released a two-disc edition of Palo Santo which featured five re-recorded tracks, remastered versions of the other six tracks, as well as a bonus disc of outtakes from the original sessions. Meiburg had felt that the original Palo Santo suffered from "murkiness", and could be improved upon in the studio.

Matador Records released the album Rook on June 3, 2008. On the tour that followed, Shearwater opened for Clinic and later Coldplay. Additional touring accompanists were added at that time: Jordan Geiger of Hospital Ships and Minus Story (on cornet, synthesizer, and percussion) and Kevin Schneider of Black Before Red (on keyboard, bass, and guitar) replaced Howard Draper.

In November, 2009, Shearwater was the just the ninth artist featured on NPR's Tiny Desk Concerts, with NPR's Stephen Thompson calling it a "glorious four-song set that was at once pristine and ramshackle", referring to the featured a set of unusual instruments including "banjos and auto parts to go with Harris' homemade 'waterphone' and hammered dulcimer".

On February 23, 2010, Shearwater released their sixth album, The Golden Archipelago, which the band produced with John Congleton. The band toured extensively behind the record in 2010, with an international tour in the spring (with Wye Oak and Hospital Ships opening) and additional U.S. dates in the fall (with special guest Damien Jurado). The Golden Archipelago concluded the band's Island Arc trilogy, a project also encompassing Palo Santo and Rook.

On November 6, 2010, the band released an instrumental album, Shearwater is Enron, via Bandcamp. The album was recorded in the spring of 2010 and includes live material recorded at a performance under the pseudonym "Enron." It introduces some textures not traditionally associated with the band, such as electronic drum tracks and squalling guitar rock. Members of Wye Oak and Hospital Ships assist on the live tracks.

=== Sub Pop Records ===
In February 2012, a new full-length album called Animal Joy was released. It was Shearwater's first record with Sub Pop Records. The record signaled a new chapter for the band after the conclusion of the Island trilogy, as the album included more rock elements. Following the release of the album, the band opened for the North American tour of Sharon Van Etten.

In 2013, Fellow Travelers was released on Sub Pop, a Shearwater album consisting entirely of cover songs by bands that Shearwater had toured with. Each band that was covered on the album was also invited to play on the album, under the condition that they could not play on their own song.

The record Jet Plane and Oxbow was released on Sub Pop January 22, 2016. Frequent collaborator, producer Danny Reisch, worked on the album, as did composer Brian Reitzell, Wye Oak's Jenn Wasner, drummer Cully Symington, Howard Draper, and regular band members Jesca Hoop, Lucas Oswald, and Abram Shook.

=== Jet Plane and Oxbow tour and self-releases ===
The band toured the Jet Plane and Oxbow album in 2016. The lineup for the tour was considerably different than the studio album, retaining Meiburg and Oswald but adding Emily Lee on keyboards, Sadie Powers on bass and Josh Halpern on drums. During the tour, it was customary for the band to play several covers from the David Bowie album Lodger as an encore. On March 25, 2016, the entire album was covered at Chicago's Schuba's Tavern, followed by a subsequent recording for the AV Club the next day. This was released as a limited edition vinyl and digital download and would eventually lead to a performance of the entire Berlin Trilogy at Brookfield Place, New York for WNYC in October 2018. The live recording was released as a limited digital download in 2019.

During the tour, Meiburg became impressed with openers Cross Record. Meiburg and Cross Record's Emily Cross and Dan Duszynski went on to form a side-project, Loma, which has released three albums on Sub Pop: the self-titled Loma (2018), Don't Shy Away (2020) and How Will I Live Without a Body? (2024).

In 2020, Shearwater began production of a crowdfunded studio album, but the recording was disrupted as a result of the COVID-19 lockdowns. In response, Meiburg enlisted Dan Duszynski to produce the ambient Quarantine Music series, released digitally through Bandcamp. The new studio album, The Great Awakening, was released in June 2022.

== Discography ==
=== Albums ===
- 2001: The Dissolving Room (Grey Flat)
- 2002: Everybody Makes Mistakes (Misra Records)
- 2004: Winged Life (Misra Records)
- 2006: Palo Santo (Misra Records)
- 2007: Palo Santo: Expanded Edition (Matador Records)
- 2008: Rook (Matador Records)
- 2010: The Golden Archipelago (Matador Records)
- 2010: Shearwater Is Enron (self-released)
- 2011: Excerpts from The Island Arc Live (self-released)
- 2012: Animal Joy (Sub Pop)
- 2013: Fellow Travelers (Sub Pop)
- 2014: Missing Islands: Demos and Outtakes 2007–2012 (self-released)
- 2016: Jet Plane and Oxbow (Sub Pop)
- 2016: Shearwater Plays Lodger (self-released; a song-for-song performance of David Bowie's 1979 album Lodger)
- 2016: Rook: Live at Florence Gould Hall (self-released)
- 2016: Live in St. Malo 2010 (self-released)
- 2017: The Sky Is a Blank Screen: Live Recordings 2016 (self-released)
- 2019: Shearwater Plays Bowie's Berlin Trilogy (self-released; live recording of David Bowie's entire Berlin Trilogy)
- 2022: The Great Awakening (Polyborus Records)
- 2026: The New World (Polyborus Records)

=== Splits ===
- 2004: Sham Wedding/Hoax Funeral by Shearwater/Okkervil River (Jound)
- 2013: Stop Draggin' My Heart Around/A Wake for the Minotaur by Shearwater & Sharon Van Etten
- 2014: Stay/Novacane by Low/Shearwater

=== EPs ===
- 2005: Thieves (Misra Records)
- 2008: The Snow Leopard (Matador Records)
- 2020: Quarantine Music Vols. 1-8 (Bandcamp)
