= Rook (album) =

Studio album by Shearwater
- Released: June 3, 2008
- Recorded: November 2007, Echo Lab, Argyle, Texas
- Genre: Indie rock
- Length: 38:18
- Language: English
- Label: Matador Records
- Producer: Jonathan Meiburg

Shearwater chronology
Palo Santo (2006)	Rook (2008)	The Golden Archipelago (2010)

Rook is the fifth studio album by American indie rock band Shearwater. It was released on June 3, 2008, on the Matador Records label. The track "Rooks" was the first single from the album. The album was previewed on May 5, 2008, and May 29, 2008, at two special concerts in Manhattan and Austin, Texas. The band toured in support of the album later in 2008. The album gained the band a spot on Entertainment Weekly's "Must List" on May 28.

Shearwater released the album on both CD and vinyl, with the vinyl version having a bonus track called "North Col". The cover art is by Kahn & Selesnick.

Co-founder Jonathan Meiburg said he chose the title for the sound of the word and the fact that it has multiple meanings. The theme of birds recurs frequently with the band, from their name to titles of songs and albums (for example, "Sing, Little Birdie" and Winged Life). Meiburg is an ornithologist.

== Music ==
The album features harp, glockenspiel, woodwind and a hammer dulcimer among more conventional instruments such as guitar and piano.

== Lyrics ==
The lyrics of Rook are mainly focused on themes of nature and fairy tale.

== Critics ==
Professional ratings
Aggregate scores
Source	Rating
Metacritic	85/100
Review scores
Source	Rating
AllMusic	4.5/5 stars
The Austin Chronicle	4/5 stars
The A.V. Club	A−
Blender	4/5 stars
MSN Music (Consumer Guide)	C−
Pitchfork	8.0/10
PopMatters	9/10
Slant Magazine	4/5 stars
Spin	3.5/5 stars
Uncut	4/5 stars

The response from critics has been very positive. At Metacritic, which assigns a normalized rating out of 100 to reviews from mainstream critics, the album has received an average score of 85 - indicating "Universal Acclaim" - based on 20 reviews. Pitchfork called it "impressive and uniformly gorgeous" and gave it an 8 out of 10 rating.

== Track listing ==
All tracks are written by Jonathan Meiburg.

No.	Title	Length
1.	"On the Death of the Waters"	3:08
2.	"Rooks"	3:21
3.	"Leviathan, Bound"	2:52
4.	"Home Life"	7:15
5.	"Lost Boys"	2:24
6.	"Century Eyes"	2:18
7.	"I Was a Cloud"	5:12
8.	"South Col"	2:35
9.	"The Snow Leopard"	5:08
10.	"The Hunter's Star"	4:00
Total length:		38:18

== Singles ==
- "Rooks" (May 27, 2008), 7" vinyl
1. "Rooks" – 3:21
2. "The Rainbow" (Talk Talk cover; recorded live at the Crocodile Cafe, Seattle) – 9:47
- The Snow Leopard EP (October 14, 2008), digital download
1. "The Snow Leopard" – 5:02
2. "So Bad" (Baby Dee cover) – 4:55
3. "North Col" – 2:17
4. "Henry Lee" (Nick Cave cover; recorded live from KUT) – 5:00
5. "Rooks" (live from Radio K) – 3:14
6. "I Was a Cloud" (live from Radio K) – 4:48
7. "South Col" / "The Snow Leopard" (live at Florence Gould Hall, NYC) – 5:56
