= Jet Plane and Oxbow =

Studio album by Shearwater
- Released: January 22, 2016
- Genre: Indie rock
- Length: 52:00
- Label: Sub Pop
- Producer: Danny Reisch

Shearwater chronology
Animal Joy (2012)	Jet Plane and Oxbow (2016)

Jet Plane and Oxbow is a studio album by the Austin, Texas, band Shearwater. It was released on January 22, 2016, under the Sub Pop label. Jonathan Meiburg has said that he wanted to "...try and make a protest record that wasn't dumb or preachy."

== Critical reception ==
Professional ratings
Aggregate scores
Source	Rating
AnyDecentMusic?	7.6/10
Metacritic	82/100
Review scores
Source	Rating
AllMusic	4.5/5 stars
The Guardian	4/5 stars
Pitchfork Media	7.5/10

The album has been generally well received. It holds an 82 average rating on Metacritic indicating "universal acclaim".

== Track listing ==
No.	Title	Length
1.	"Prime"	3:38
2.	"Quiet Americans"	3:33
3.	"A Long Time Away"	4:10
4.	"Backchannels"	4:45
5.	"Filaments"	6:10
6.	"Pale Kings"	4:13
7.	"Only Child"	4:31
8.	"Glass Bones"	3:39
9.	"Wildlife in America"	5:09
10.	"Radio Silence"	6:38
11.	"Stray Light at Clouds Hill"	5:39

== Demos and Outtakes 2013 ==
In a July 19, 2022 Bandcamp post, Jonathan Meiburg advised fans that the demos for Jet Plane and Oxbow had been digitally located and would be accessible to Patreon subscribers for one week. He wrote that the tracks could not be made available on Bandcamp for contractual reasons. No further future release was mentioned, however the wav format files were accompanied by full back and front cover artwork. Four of the songs were developed and included on the album, whilst an additional seven did not survive beyond demo stage. Meiburg: "They're more like sketches than paintings, but you can hear what they're going to be, or might have been."

No.	Title	Length
1.	"Prime (2013 demo)"	3:33
2.	"A Long Time Away (2013 demo)"	5:13
3.	"Lalibela (2013 demo)"	3:24
4.	"White Diamond (2013 demo)"	3:14
5.	"Yalla Yalla (2013 demo)"	3:44
6.	"Wildlife In America (2013 demo)"	4:07
7.	"Evidence (2013 demo)"	3:46
8.	"Family No More (2013 demo)"	2:31
9.	"Husking A Shadow (2013 demo)"	2:58
10.	"Munich (2013 demo)"	3:29
11.	"Stray Light at Clouds Hill (2013 demo)"	5:43

== Charts ==
Chart (2016)	Peak position
Belgian Albums (Ultratop Flanders)	81
