= Jaimie Branch =

American jazz trumpeter and composer (1983–2022)

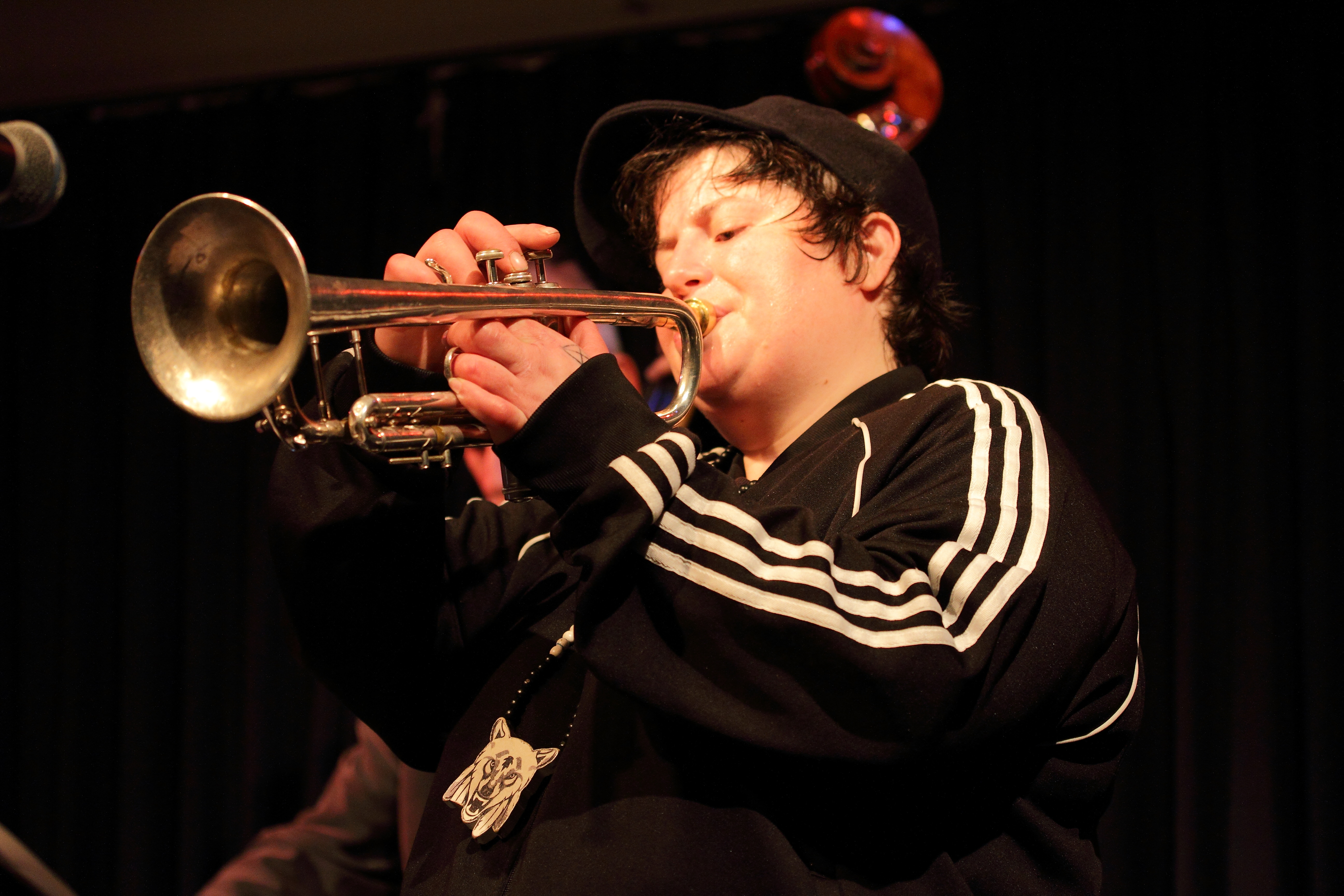
- Branch at Club W71

Background information
- Born: June 17, 1983; Huntington, New York, U.S.
- Died: August 22, 2022 (aged 39) Brooklyn, New York, U.S.
- Genre: Jazz
- Occupation: Musician
- Instrument: Trumpet
- Years active: 2006–2022
- Label: International Anthem

Jaimie "Breezy" Branch (June 17, 1983 – August 22, 2022) was an American jazz trumpeter and composer.

== Life and career ==
Branch was born in Huntington, New York, on June 17, 1983. She started playing trumpet at age nine. At age 14, she moved to Wilmette, a suburb of Chicago, where she attended New Trier High School. She attended the New England Conservatory of Music. In her teen years, Branch played trumpet in jazz, classical, and rock settings.

After graduating, Branch moved back to Chicago, working as a musician, organizer, and sound engineer on the local music scene, including with Jason Ajemian (on The Art of Dying, 2006), Keefe Jackson's Project Project (on Just Like This, 2007), Tim Daisy's New Fracture Quartet (on 1000 Lights, 2008), Anton Hatwich, and Ken Vandermark. She performed in Chicago and New York with her trio Princess, Princess (with bassist Toby Summerfield and drummer Frank Rosaly) and in trios with Tim Daisy and Daniel Levin.

In 2012 Branch moved to Baltimore, where she worked toward a master's degree in Jazz performance from Towson University. At this time she also founded the record label Pionic Records, which released the music of her group Bomb Shelter. After two years, she dropped out of Towson, and six months later she moved to New York to seek treatment for heroin addiction.

In the spring of 2015 Branch moved to Brooklyn, where she began working with Fred Lonberg-Holm, Mike Pride, Luke Stewart, Jason Nazary, Tcheser Holmes, and many more. In addition, she performed on albums with the independent rock groups Never Enough Hope, Local H and The Atlas Moth. As of 2016, she worked in a quartet with Chad Taylor (drums), Jason Ajemian (bass) and Tomeka Reid (cello), as well as with Mike Pride, Shayna Dulberger and Weasel Walter, and with Yoni Kretzmer and Tobey Cederberg. In 2017 she released her debut solo album, Fly or Die, with Tomeka Reid, Jason Ajemian, Chad Taylor, Matt Schneider, Ben LaMar Gay, and Josh Berman.

Fly or Die was chosen as one of NPR Music's Top 50 Albums of 2017.

Branch cited Don Cherry, Axel Dörner, Booker Little, Miles Davis, and Evan Parker among her musical influences.

Branch died at home in the Red Hook section of Brooklyn on August 22, 2022, at the age of 39, from an accidental drug overdose. Following her death, Branch was memorialized by her musician peers.

== Discography ==
=== Albums as bandleader ===
- Fly or Die (International Anthem, 2017)
- Fly or Die II: Bird Dogs of Paradise (International Anthem, 2019)
- Fly or Die Live (International Anthem, 2021)
- Fly or Die Fly or Die Fly or Die (World War) (International Anthem, 2023)

=== With Anteloper ===
Duo with Jason Nazary

- 2018: Kudu (International Anthem)
- 2020: Tour Beats Vol. 1 (International Anthem)
- 2022: Pink Dolphins (International Anthem)

=== Collaborations ===
- Keefe Jackson's Project Project (with Dave Rempis, Guillermo Gregorio, Anton Hatwich, Jason Stein, James Falzone, Frank Rosaly, Josh Berman, Jeb Bishop, Nick Broste, Marc Unternährer), Just Like This (Delmark Records, 2007)
- New Fracture Quartet (with Nate McBride, Tim Daisy, Dave Miller), 1,000 Lights (Multikulti Project, 2008)
- Predella Group (with Nate McBride, Fred Lonberg-Holm, Tim Daisy, Jeff Parker, Ken Vandermark, Jeb Bishop), Strade D ' Acqua / Roads of Water (Multikulti, 2010)
- Bullet Hell (with Jakob Kart and Theodore Representerer), Smart Bombs (Pionic, 2013)
- Beyond All Things (with Chris Welcome and others), Live at the Bushwick Series (gaucimusic, 2018)
- Party Knüllers X Jaimie Branch, Live at la Casa (2019)
- Ig Henneman, Jaimie Branch & Anne La Berge, Dropping Stuff and Other Folk Songs (Relative Pitch, 2019)
- An Unruly Manifesto (James Brandon Lewis and others), An Unruly Manifesto (Relative Pitch, 2019)
- Medicine Singers, Medicine Singers (Stone Tapes & Joyful Noise, 2022)
- Dave Gisler Trio (with Jaimie Branch), Zurich Concert (Intakt, 2020)
- Dave Gisler Trio (with Jaimie Branch and David Murray), See You Out There (Intakt, 2022)
