= Animal Joy =

Studio album by Shearwater
- Released: February 28, 2012
- Genre: Indie rock
- Length: 43:05
- Label: Sub Pop

Shearwater chronology
The Golden Archipelago (2010)	Animal Joy (2012)	Jet Plane and Oxbow (2016)

Animal Joy is the seventh studio album by the Austin, Texas, band Shearwater. It was released on February 28, 2012, under the Sub Pop label.

== Track listing ==
All songs written by Jonathan Meiburg

No.	Title	Length
1.	"Animal Life"	3:38
2.	"Breaking the Yearlings"	3:08
3.	"Dread Sovereign"	3:50
4.	"You as You Were"	3:42
5.	"Insolence"	6:24
6.	"Immaculate"	2:26
7.	"Open Your Houses (Basilisk)"	3:24
8.	"Run the Banner Down"	2:50
9.	"Pushing the River"	4:32
10.	"Believing Makes It Easy"	4:11
11.	"Star of the Age"	5:01
12.	"I'm So Glad (bonus track)"	3:24
