= Etchemin language =

Language

Etchemin
- Native to: United States
- Region: Maine
- Extinct: 17th century
- Language family: Algic: Algonquian; Eastern Algonquian; Etchemin

Language codes
- ISO 639-3: etc
- Glottolog: etch1234

Etchemin was a language of the Algonquian language family, spoken in early colonial times on the coast of Maine. Little survives of Etchemin beyond a word list and it is unknown how different the language is from others in the Eastern Algonquian family.

== Name ==
The word Etchemin has many possible sources. One possibility is that it is a French alteration of an Algonquian word for 'canoe' chiman. It may also be a translation of skicin, the native word for people in use by the inhabitants of the St. John and St. Croix Rivers. Linguist Peter Bakker has even argued that the origin of Etchemin is from the Basque words etxe-pinu 'houses of pine' since Samuel de Champlain's scout noted they lived in long houses.

== History ==
The Etchemin people inhabited the region from Kennebec River to the St. John River. They called their homeland ketakamigwa which literally means 'the big land on the sea coast'.

In the 17th-century, the Etchemins allied themselves with the Abenakis under the Mawooshen Confederacy. Following an epidemic and the death of their leader Bashabas, the dwindling communities became more intertwined. The Abenaki language gradually fell into favor over Etchemin, although it is possible some Etchemin words remained in use.

The only known record of the Etchemin language is a list of the numbers from one to ten recorded by Marc Lescarbot in the early 17th century and published in his book The History of New France (1609). The numerals in the list match those of Malecite-Passamaquoddy, Eastern Abenaki, as well as languages of southern New England such as Wampanoag, but as a set they do not match any other Algonquian language. The Etchemin language disappeared not long after Lescarbot's visit, and it is unknown what became of the tribe. All other language records called 'Etchemin', under more detailed analysis, appear to be the neighboring Malecite-Passamaquoddy language.

== Sample words ==
Other words known include remoose 'dog', kesus 'sun/moon', and shamogoon 'water'.

Numbers 1-5
Etchemin	English
bechkon	one
nich	two
nach	three
iau	four
prenchk	five
