= Rob Halverson =

American songwriter

- Genres: Rock; lo-fi; blues; jazz
- Occupations: Songwriter; album producer; musician; engineer
- Instruments: Guitar; theremin; bass; violin; keyboards
- Years active: 1981–present
- Website: www.RobHalverson.com

Rob Halverson is an American record producer, songwriter and studio engineer, who lives in Austin, Texas. He is also a film composer.

The Austin Chronicle claims Halverson "a low-key but nonetheless very important figure in Austin music since 1989". He has performed tours of Australia twice, and has toured in Europe and UK numerous times. He has released two solo records, and six instrumental albums with Thor Harris. Halverson has recorded or produced over 100 albums.

== Discography ==
partial

- 1999: Fields of Innards w/ An Ocean of Despair by Thor & Rob Halverson (self-released)
- 2009: Drums and Drunken Circuit Bender by Thor & Rob Halverson (self-released)
- 2010: Fields of Innards II by Thor & Rob Halverson (self-released)
- 2011: R.O.A.R. by Thor & Rob Halverson (self-released)
