= Fly or Die Fly or Die Fly or Die (World War) =

Studio album by Jaimie Branch
- Released: August 25, 2023
- Recorded: April 2022
- Studio: Bemis Center for Contemporary Arts, Omaha, Nebraska
- Genre: Punk jazz
- Length: 46:00
- Label: International Anthem
- Producer: Jaimie Branch

Jaimie Branch chronology
| Fly or Die Live (2021) | Fly or Die Fly or Die Fly or Die (World War) (2023) |

Fly or Die Fly or Die Fly or Die (World War) (Note: Stylized as Fly or Die Fly or Die Fly or Die ((world war))) is the posthumous third studio album by American jazz trumpeter Jaimie Branch, released through International Anthem Recording Company on August 25, 2023. It was recorded by Branch in April 2022 at the Bemis Center for Contemporary Arts in Omaha, Nebraska. Mixes were completed by Branch's quartet Fly or Die and her family after her death in August 2022. The album received universal acclaim from critics.

== Critical reception ==
Professional ratings
Aggregate scores
| Source | Rating |
|---|---|
| Metacritic | 95/100 |
Review scores
| Source | Rating |
| AllMusic | 4.5/5 stars |
| Mojo | 5/5 stars |
| The Observer | 5/5 stars |
| Paste | 9.0/10 |
| Pitchfork | 8.5/10 |
| Uncut | 9/10 |

Fly or Die Fly or Die Fly or Die (World War) received a score of 95 out of 100 on review aggregator Metacritic based on ten critics' reviews, indicating "universal acclaim". Pitchfork gave it their "Best New Album" distinction, with Andy Cush calling it "a heartbreaking glimpse of where [Branch] might have gone next, but more importantly, it's a joy to hear". Cush also wrote that while "it is tempting to hear the album as a requiem, or a grand finale for her brief but impactful career", "further listening" makes it feel "less like an ending than a blossoming cruelly cut short". Uncut stated that "what should have been the next step in Branch's innovative career became a tragically beautiful final document that captured an artist cresting a peak", and Mojo felt that the album "finds her super-brassy, minimally-tooled groove machine in peak form".

AllMusic's Matt Collar found there to be "a psychedelic rock quality to much of the album" as Branch "takes all of what came before and pushes it to the limit, crafting a dynamic punk-jazz album underpinned by the groups' textured acoustic chamber group improv and joyous street-party energy". Giovanni Russonello of The New York Times described it as "just as electrifying as the group's first two LPs, but with a wider sonic horizon and more parts in motion. And there's a triumphant streak running through it that only heightens the pain of Branch's demise". Kitty Empire of The Observer called it a "testament to [Branch's] inventiveness and commitment to 'make music into the void'" and felt there is a "punk disposition" in its tracks, "immolating assumptions around the j-word. Fly or Die III (for brevity) rocks, rolls and generally throws itself around".

Pitchfork ranked it the 28th best album of 2023, while The Guardian ranked it 48th.

== Track listing ==
Fly or Die Fly or Die Fly or Die (World War) track listing
| No. | Title | Length |
|---|---|---|
| 1. | "Aurora Rising" | 1:58 |
| 2. | "Borealis Dancing" | 7:01 |
| 3. | "Burning Grey" | 9:10 |
| 4. | "The Mountain" (featuring Jason Ajemian) | 4:56 |
| 5. | "Baba Louie" | 9:07 |
| 6. | "Bolinko Bass" | 4:32 |
| 7. | "And Kuma Walks" | 1:59 |
| 8. | "Take Over the World" | 4:58 |
| 9. | "World War (Reprise)" | 3:06 |
| Total length: | | 46:00 |

== Personnel ==
- Jaimie Branch – trumpet, voice, keyboard, percussion, cover art, editing
- Lester St. Louis – cello, voice, flute, marimba, keyboard, liner notes
- Jason Ajemian – double bass, electric bass, voice, marimba, liner notes
- Chad Taylor – drums, mbira, timpani, bells, marimba, liner notes
- David M. Allen – mastering, mixing
- Dave Vettraino – mixing, engineering, editing
- Kate Branch – editing
- Craig Hansen – design, layout
- John Herndon – cover art
- Damon Locks – cover design
- Ben Semisch – photography

== Charts ==
Chart performance for Fly or Die Fly or Die Fly or Die (World War)
| Chart (2023) | Peak position |
|---|---|
| UK Independent Albums (Official Charts) | 20 |
