= Loma (band) =

American indie rock band

- Origin: Dripping Springs, Texas, U.S.
- Genres: Indie rock; art rock; ambient pop
- Years active: 2016–present
- Label: Sub Pop
- Members: Emily Cross; Jonathan Meiburg; Dan Duszynski

Loma is an American indie rock band formed in 2016 in Dripping Springs, Texas, by singer and visual artist Emily Cross, multi-instrumentalist Jonathan Meiburg and musician and producer/engineer Dan Duszynski. The group formed after Cross Record (Cross and Duszynski) toured with Meiburg's band Shearwater, leading the three to collaborate. They released their self-titled debut album on Sub Pop in 2018, followed by Don't Shy Away (2020) and How Will I Live Without a Body? (2024).

== History ==
=== Formation and debut album (2016–2018) ===
Loma formed in 2016 in Dripping Springs, Texas, after Shearwater frontman Jonathan Meiburg began working with Cross Record members Emily Cross and Dan Duszynski following a shared tour. The trio recorded their self-titled debut album at Duszynski's home studio, Dandy Sounds, a rammed earth house whose acoustics and surrounding wildlife contributed field recordings incorporated into the music. During the sessions, they developed a signature vocal approach in which Cross's voice was subtly pitched down, described by the band as a "sonic mask” that became a recurring feature of their work. Loma was released by Sub Pop in 2018.

=== Don’t Shy Away (2019–2021) ===
Meiburg and Duszynski began developing new material at Duszynski's Texas studio while Cross was touring her solo project, with Cross joining later to select and refine the songs. Don’t Shy Away was released in 2020 on Sub Pop and recorded largely at the same studio. The album broadened the group's sound with programmed electronics, horns, free jazz-influenced textures and extensive field recordings. Meiburg wrote most of the lyrics, Cross shaped vocal and structural choices, and Duszynski oversaw engineering and mixing. The group discovered Brian Eno was a fan after he praised the album track "Black Willow" on BBC Radio, which led to their inviting him to collaborate on the track "Homing."

=== How Will I Live Without a Body? (2022–present) ===
Following Don't Shy Away, the members of Loma lived in different countries—Cross in Dorset, Meiburg in Germany and Duszynski at Dandy Sounds in Texas—and began work on a third album remotely before reconvening in England to record in the stone house where Cross works as an end-of-life doula and in a nearby chapel used for natural reverb. The album title comes from AI-generated text trained on Laurie Anderson's work, elements of which appear in "How It Starts" and "Affinity." How Will I Live Without a Body? was released by Sub Pop on June 28, 2024.

== Discography ==
=== Studio albums ===
- Loma (2018, Sub Pop)
- Don’t Shy Away (2020, Sub Pop)
- How Will I Live Without a Body? (2024, Sub Pop)
