= Heavy Meadow =

Studio album by Anni Rossi
- Released: August 10, 2010
- Genre: Alternative rock, lo-fi, electronica
- Length: 36:59
- Label: Self-released
- Producer: Steve Albini

Anni Rossi chronology
Rockwell (2007)	Heavy Meadow (2010)

Heavy Meadow is a solo album by Anni Rossi, initially released in 2010 on iTunes after a split with the 4AD record label. In 2011, the album was released in the UK via 3 Syllables records.

== Track listing ==
All songs were written by Anni Rossi.

1. Candyland
2. Crushing Limbs
3. Hatchet
4. Sandstorm
5. Switchblade
6. Texan Plains
7. Land Majestic
8. Frame Me Right
9. The Fight
10. Cha Cha Cha
11. Safety Of Objects
