= Rockwell (album) =

Studio album by Anni Rossi
- Released: March 9, 2009
- Genre: Alternative rock, lo-fi
- Length: 26:15
- Label: 4AD
- Producer: Steve Albini

Anni Rossi chronology
Afton (EP) (2007)	Rockwell (2009)	Heavy Meadow (2010)

Professional ratings
Aggregate scores
Source	Rating
Album of the Year	71/100
Metacritic	70/100
Review scores
Source	Rating
Drowned in Sound	7/10
The Line of Best Fit	79%
musicOMH	4/5 stars
NME	2/5 stars
Pitchfork	8/10
PopMatters	7/10 stars
Prefix	7/10
Salt Lake City Weekly	4/5 stars
The Skinny	4/5 stars
Urb	3/5 stars

Rockwell is the debut solo album by Anni Rossi, released on March 9, 2009 via 4AD records. It was recorded by Steve Albini at Electrical Audio in Illinois.

== Track listing ==
All songs were written by Anni Rossi.

1. "Machine" – 2:31
2. "Ecology" – 1:55
3. "Las Vegas" – 3:38
4. "The West Coast" – 2:36
5. "Deer Hunting Camp 17" – 2:49
6. "Living In Danger" – 2:30
7. "Venice" – 2:36
8. "Glaciers" – 2:07
9. "Wheelpusher" – 3:12
10. "Air Is Nothing" – 2:19
