= The Golden Archipelago =

Studio album by Shearwater
- Released: February 23, 2010
- Recorded: 2009, Sonic Ranch, El Paso, Texas; Public Hi-Fi, Austin, Texas; Elmwood, Dallas, Texas; Halversonics Recording, Austin, Texas
- Genres: Indie rock, progressive rock
- Length: 38:11
- Language: English
- Label: Matador Records
- Producers: John Congleton and Shearwater

Shearwater chronology
Rook (2008)	The Golden Archipelago (2010)	Animal Joy (2012)

The Golden Archipelago is the sixth studio album by American indie rock band Shearwater. It was released on February 23, 2010, on the Matador Records label. The track "Black Eyes" is the first single from the album.

Shearwater released the album on both CD and vinyl. The first pressing of the CD includes a 50-page booklet with lyrics, as well as collected photographs from the "Golden Dossier," featuring images, maps and texts of island exploration themes.

== Music ==
The album was produced by John Congleton and Shearwater.

== Reception ==
Professional ratings
Review scores
Source	Rating
Allmusic	3.5/5 stars
The Austin Chronicle	3.5/4 stars
BBC Music	(positive)
Chicago Tribune	3.5/4 stars
Clash	(7/10)
Drowned in Sound	(8/10)
The Fly	4.5/5 stars
The Generalista	(favorable)
Gigwise	3.5/5 stars
The Irish Times	3/5 stars
The List	3/5 stars
Mojo	3/5 stars
MusicOMH	3.5/5 stars
NME	(8/10)
Paste	(82/100)
Pitchfork Media	(7.9/10)
Prefix Magazine	(6.5/10)
Q Magazine	3/5 stars
The Skinny	4/5 stars
Slant Magazine	4.5/5 stars
Spin	2.5/5 stars
Sputnik Music	4.5/5 stars
Tiny Mix Tapes	4/5 stars
Uncut	3/5 stars
Virgin Music	(7/10)

The album has so far received moderately positive reviews, garnering an aggregate score of 74 out of 100 on Metacritic, based on 23 reviews. Some critics noted its softer sound, compared to the grandeur of previous albums like Rook and Palo Santo. Allmusic compared it to 1970s Peter Gabriel and Pink Floyd's The Final Cut, saying it lacked many of Rook's "more muscular moments."

Music critics also lauded Shearwater's commitment to the album format in the age of MP3s, making a cohesive, conceptual work of progressive rock, rather than simply a collection of singles.

== Track listing ==
1. "Meridian" – 3:37
2. "Black Eyes" – 3:40
3. "Landscape at Speed" – 4:33
4. "Hidden Lakes" – 3:47
5. "Corridors" – 2:46
6. "God Made Me" – 4:23
7. "Runners of the Sun" – 2:53
8. "Castaways" – 3:16
9. "An Insular Life" – 3:09
10. "Uniforms" – 3:49
11. "Missing Islands" – 2:18

== Singles ==
- "Black Eyes" (January 19, 2010)
