= Glyne Piggott =

Canadian linguist

Glyne Piggott is an emeritus professor of linguistics at McGill University in Montreal, Canada. During his four decades at McGill, he served terms as associate dean of the faculty of arts, as well as director of undergraduate studies, graduate program director, and chair of the department of linguistics. He was the vice-president and president-elect of the Canadian Linguistic Association from 2002 to 2003.

To commemorate his retirement in 2010, a conference entitled "Phonology in the 21st Century: In Honour of Glyne Piggott" was hosted by McGill University.

== Contribution to linguistics ==
A celebrated scholar in the fields of phonology and morphology, Piggott completed his graduate studies at the University of Toronto with a focus on Amerindian languages, particularly Ojibwa. His research on Ojibwa phonology has been instrumental to the analysis of nasal vowels in that language. Further research on syllabification and stress assignment has established a dichotomy between languages whose syllabification relies on the use of codas and those whose right-edge constituents are best analyzed as the onsets of empty-headed syllables.

Piggott has been on the editorial board of journals such as The Linguistic Review, member of the advisory board for numerous conferences including the Manchester Phonology Meeting, and an evaluator on departmental review committees, such as for the Linguistics Department of Memorial University in Newfoundland.

== Educational outreach ==
Born and educated in Barbados, Piggott has been an outspoken supporter of universal education in the Caribbean. His contribution to scholarship, education, and the Barbadian community was celebrated at the 30th-anniversary ceremony of the Modernite Association of Toronto in 2014. He is a special advisor for the Superkutz Scholarship Foundation, a not-for-profit organization providing scholarships for Montreal youth who lack the funds to pursue higher education, and a member of the board of directors and scholarship selection committee for the Quebec Black Medical Association.

== Bibliography ==
- Piggott, Glyne. 2000. Against featural alignment. Journal of Linguistics 36.1: 85-129.
- Piggott, Glyne. 1999. At the right edge of words. The Linguistic Review 16.2: 143-185.
- Kessler, Martine and Glyne Piggott. 1999. Prosodic features of familial language impairment: constraints on stress assignment. Folia Phoniatrica et Logopaedica 51: 55-69.
- Piggott, Glyne. 1998. Foot form and the parsing of weightless syllables. In M. Gruber, D. Higgins, K. Olson and T. Wysocki, eds., Papers from the 34th Regional Meeting of the Chicago Linguistic Society (CLS 34, Main Session),315-332. Chicago: Chicago Linguistics Society.
- Humbert, Helga and Glyne Piggott. 1997. Representations and constraints: The case of Guarani Nasal harmony. In Geert Booij and Jeroen van de Weijer, eds., HIL Phonology Papers III, 219-256. The Hague: Holland Academic Graphics.
- Piggott, G. and A. Grafstein (1983) An Ojibwa lexicon. Ottawa: National Museum of Canada
- Piggott, Glyne L. (1980), Aspects of Odawa morphophonemics (Published version of PhD dissertation, University of Toronto, 1974), New York: Garland, ISBN 0-8240-4557-2
- Piggott, Glyne L. (1980) 'Implications of linguistic change for concrete phonology'. Canadian Journal of Linguistics 25:1, 1-19
