= Director (Yonatan Gat album) =

Studio album by Yonatan Gat
- Released: March 3, 2015
- Genre: Punk rock; improvisation; avant garde; free jazz; psychedelic rock
- Label: Joyful Noise Recordings
- Producer: Chris Woodhouse

Yonatan Gat chronology
Iberian Passages EP (2014)	Director (2015)	Universalists (2018)

Director is Yonatan Gat's debut full-length studio-album released in 2015 on Joyful Noise Recordings. Gal Lazer plays drums, and Sergio Sayeg is on bass. The album was recorded live by Chris Woodhouse (Ty Segall, Thee Oh Sees) in less than 3 days during a US tour. According to Gat, the band went into the studio with just a few songs and ideas. Though effectively composed of "hours upon hours" of mixed-down, in-studio improvisations spliced together with field recordings that Gat had taken during his travels, the album's sound takes its inspiration from soundtrack virtuosos like Ennio Morricone and Nino Rota.

Stylistically the album samples a wide-variety of global traditions "touch[ing] on everything from bossa nova to soukous, Tortoise-style jazz-rock to the head-swimming spazz-outs of Ponytail," and fuses, "the psych-jazz improv fusion of late-period Miles Davis, weirdo Middle Eastern surf-rawk and Western African complexities with raging punk rock intensity."

== Track listing ==
1. East to West - 5:06
2. Casino Café - 2:09
3. Canal - 1:28
4. Gold Rush - 3:15
5. Theme from a Dark Party - 1:50
6. North to South - 5:48
7. Boxwood - 1:19
8. Gibraltar - 3:23
9. Underwater Prelude - 0:58
10. L'Atlantis - 2:07
11. Tanto Que Nem Tem - 1:53
