= The Dissolving Room =

Studio album by Shearwater
- Released: February 20, 2001
- Genre: Indie Rock
- Label: Grey Flat

Shearwater chronology
The Dissolving Room (2001)	Everybody Makes Mistakes (2002)

Professional ratings
Review scores
Source	Rating
Allmusic	3/5 stars

The Dissolving Room is Shearwater's first full-length album, released on February 20, 2001, by Grey Flat Records.

== Track listing ==
1. "Mulholland" (Jonathan Meiburg) - 3:27
2. "Ella is the First Rider" (Will Sheff) - 3:38
3. "Grey Lining" (Will Sheff) - 3:25
4. "Angelina" (Jonathan Meiburg) - 2:39
5. "Sung into the Street" (Will Sheff) - 3:15
6. "Little Locket" (Will Sheff) - 3:12
7. "Military Clothes" (Jonathan Meiburg) - 2:17
8. "The Left Side" (Will Sheff) - 2:59
9. "Not Tonight" (Will Sheff) - 3:52
10. "If You Stay Sober" (Jonathan Meiburg) - 2:49
11. "Long Ride" (Will Sheff) - 1:32
12. "This Confiscated House" (Jonathan Meiburg) - 2:59
