= Massachusett phonology =

The phonology of the Massachusett language was re-introduced to the Mashpee, Aquinnah, Herring Pond and Assonet tribes that participate in the Wôpanâak Language Reclamation Project, co-founded by Jessie Little Doe Baird in 1993. The phonology is based regular sound changes that took place in the development of Proto-Eastern Algonquian from Proto-Algonquian, as well as cues in the colonial orthography regarding pronunciation, as the writing system was based on English pronunciation and spelling conventions in use at the time, keeping in mind differences in late seventeenth century English versus today. Other resources included information from extant Algonquian languages with native speakers.

The Massachusett language is an eastern branch Algonquian language within the Algic language family. It was historically spoken by the Massachusett people of Greater Boston, the Pawtucket of southernmost Maine, coastal New Hampshire and the lower Merrimack River watershed, the Wampanoag of southeastern Massachusetts but specifically Cape Cod and the Islands and portions of Rhode Island, the Nauset (possibly a Wampanoag sub-group) of the outer Cape and the Coweset of north-western Rhode Island, and likely spread as a common second language to many Nipmuc and Pennacook speaking groups. In a simplified Pidgin form, it was a common medium of intertribal communication across most of New England and Long Island.

The historical phonology of the language is hampered by the dormancy of the language with the death of the last speakers at the end of the nineteenth century as well as dialect leveling. Since the Bible and most of the missionary translations were based on the dialect of the Massachusett people, specifically its Natick variety, that form gained prestige. The use of Natick as a training center for Indian missionaries and teachers, who were literate and often drawn from Natick's local families, helped spread the prestige of the particular variety, so that most dialectal differences were quickly lost. Dialects certainly existed given the diversity of peoples that used it and its broad distribution.

== Vowels ==
	Front	Central	Back
Close	iː		uː
Mid		ə	
Open	aː, aːj		ã

Massachusett vowels can be subdivided into two categories, the short vowels /a/ and /ə/ and the long vowels /aː/, /ã/, /iː/, and /uː/—although /ã/ is sometimes considered in its own category of nasal vowel. The sequence /aːj/ is prevalent in inanimate intransitive verbs that translate as 'it is X', and in the colonial orthography it had unitary spellings like ⟨i⟩, e.g. PA *wapyawi > PEA *wa·pe·yɘw > PSNEA *wąpa·yɘw > Massachusett wompi (wôpay) /wãpaːj/, ('it is white.')

=== Vocalic allophones ===
The exact values and ranges for allophonic variation of the vowels is unknown, given the death of the last native speakers a century and a quarter in the past, but given that the colonial orthography was based on English values as spoken in the seventeenth century, some clues are provided. The short vowel /a/ before /h/ was often replaced by ⟨u⟩ in colonial documents. Given that open front unrounded /a/ before /h/ was often syncopated, it is likely this allophone approached [ə]. Dialectal variation aside, it is likely that /a/ may have also backed to [ɑ] in some environments.

The long vowel /iː/ was often written with ⟨i⟩ in colonial documents before /sk/ or /ʃk/, indicating it may have shortened to [i] in these environments. A similar process also occurs in Abenakian languages. In the development of Massachusett from Proto-Eastern Algonquian, historical *ī weakened to [ə], which triggers k-palatization and vowel affection in certain environments, processes described further down in the article.

The long vowel /aː/ is written in a myriad of ways, which may just be the difficulty in rendering the vowel according to English spelling rules as used in the colonial orthography. It is likely that most instances were generally [aː], but it most likely backed [ɑː] or [ɔː].

The long, nasal vowel /ã/ (possibly better represented by /ãː/ to indicate length in addition to nasality) may also frequently approach the mid-open nasal [ɔ̃ː]. Before /h/, colonial writers used ⟨u⟩, possibly indicating an allophone [ə̃ː] before /h/. The colonial orthography assigns vowels with a circumflex to write them, but this was not done consistently. A silent ⟨m⟩ (before /p/) and ⟨n⟩ (elsewhere) was often used to indicate nasality, but writers often confused usage of the circumflex, to mark nasality, and the acute accent, to mark stress and length.

The long vowel /uː/, represented in the colonial orthography by ⟨ꝏ⟩ or ⟨oo⟩ and ⟨8⟩ in the modern one, was often written with ⟨o⟩ in the earliest colonial writings, suggesting a change from a mid-back vowel or close-mid vowel [oː] to a close-back [uː], which can be reconstructed from development. For example, 'snake' is askꝏk (ask8k) /askuːk/ and descends from Proto-Algonquian *aθko·ka and Proto-Eastern Algonquian *axko·k. Eliot created a letter ⟨ꝏ⟩ represented in the modern Wampanoag script as ⟨8⟩ to distinguish the long 'oo' from the short 'oo,' but noted that the vowel he was trying to represent was between the two. Just as /oː/, represented in Algonquian linguistics as ⟨*o·⟩, shifted to /uː/, a similar process occurred in English just a few generations before Eliot's time during the Great Vowel Shift, and both book and mood would have rhymed with the current pronunciations of poke and mode; even in the Early Modern English of Eliot's time, mood and book shared the same vowel.

== Consonants ==
	Labial	Alveolar	Palatal/ Postalveolar	Velar	Glottal
Nasal	m	n			
Plosive	p	t	tʲ	k	
Affricate			tʃ		
Fricative		s	ʃ		h
Approximant	w		j		

Massachusett has thirteen consonant phonemes, not including possible allophones. They are divided into the affricate /tʃ/; plosive /p/, /t/, /k/, /kʷ/ and the voiceless alveolo-palatal stop /tʲ/; the voiceless affricates /s/, /ʃ/ and /h/ and the voiced continuants, which comprises the voiced nasal /m/ and /n/ and the voiced approximants /w/ and /j/. The stop consonants were particularly difficult for early English missionaries to record with the Latin alphabet because Massachusett did not make phonemic distinctions of voicing with these consonants, and these consonants likely had voiced allophones of [b, d, ɡ, ɡʷ, dʲ], dependent upon word environment, dialect, or speaker. In addition, Massachusett consonants probably lacked distinctions based on aspiration for these consonants. In English, the equivalent stop consonants are aspirated in stressed and in final positions, but not in consonant clusters after /s/ (for example, English spin is pronounced [spɪn] while pin is pronounced [pʰɪn]).

As a result of these differing phonologies, the colonial orthography can be separated into unvoiced/voiced pairs that do not change meaning, such as ⟨c⟩/⟨k⟩/⟨g⟩, ⟨p⟩/⟨b⟩, ⟨q[u]⟩/⟨g[w]⟩, ⟨s⟩/⟨z⟩ and ⟨d⟩/⟨t⟩, which correspond to ⟨k⟩, ⟨p⟩, ⟨q⟩, ⟨s⟩ and ⟨t⟩, respectively, in the modern orthography. Eliot and the other colonial missionaries often switched between the unvoiced-voiced pairs, and it is possible that the consonants themselves had allophones dependent on word position and dialect.

The phonetic value of /s/ in clusters probably approached [s̪], given the alteration of /hs/ and /hʃ/ and /sk/ and /ʃk/ in representation in the colonial orthography. As /s/ and /ʃ/ had merged in Proto-Southern New England Algonquian, restoration of /ʃ/ in consonants, especially in clusters with /h/, indicates that the allophone of /s/ in these environments was generally [s̪], which sounds closer to /ʃ/ and generally represented by ⟨sh⟩ in the WLRP new orthography.

As a result of borrowings, English-language religious, technical, agricultural, legal, societal, cultural, and governmental terminology was adopted by the Indians. Foreign sounds, or recognition of the preferred allophone, led to the adoption of /b/, /d/, /f/, /ɡ/, /dʒ/, /ʒ/, /θ/, /ð/ and /ŋ/ as phonemes in these English loanwords. However, it is likely that only bilingual speakers or those exposed to English speakers pronounced these words more akin to their English values, whereas monolingual Massachusett speakers and those further from English contact would have likely used native approximantions. For example, colonial-era documents include both preserved Frenchmenog (possibly [frɛntʃmənak]) vs. nativized panachmanog (possibly [pənãtʃmənak]). In addition, anecdotal evidence from accounts of English colonists indicate that the Massachusett or related N-dialect speakers had trouble with English /r/ and /l/, even though they existed in related languages, since they pronounced English words sleep and lobster as sneep and nobstah. However, final /r/ goes unnoticed as English in New England developed non-rhotically.

Although the revived dialect of the Wampanoag continues to use some loan words from English (such as pâyum-, /paːjəm/ from English pay), most borrowings are eschewed for native equivalents, neologisms coined from known Massachusett radicals and adoption of terms from cognate, extant Algonquian languages since the new speakers of the language are all bilingual or more proficient in English. For example, the colonial-era Indians adopted the English calendrical system, and adopted all the terms for units of time and names for the days and months. Thus, 'Thursday' and as well as its alternate Early Modern English form Y^{urſday} existed along the lesser-used Massachusett coinage nappanatashikquinishonk (nôpanatahshuquneehshôk) /nãpanatahʃəkʷəniːhʃãk/, which can be translated as 'that which goes five days long' (after the [original] Sabbath). However, nappanatashikquinishonk is created from Massachusett radicals by the Indians, even if it referred to a Western cultural introduction.

== Phonotactics ==
Few consonant clusters, especially in relation to Proto-Eastern Algonquian and Proto-Algonquian, are permitted in the Massachusett language; however, syncopation, i.e., deletion of /a/, /ə/ or /iː/ when they fall in weak or weaker stress positions in a word, increased the number of possible clusters in the rare Massachusett dialects that employed it. Clusters also tend to occur at the end of a root word before a following suffix, often restoring etymological /ʷ/ and /ʲ/ or even entire syllables, which were dropped at the end of consonants as early as Proto-Eastern Algonquian, but are common enough that they have to be learned. For example, annum (anum, 'dog,') but annúmmwag (anumwak, /anəmwak/, 'dogs'). Also, additional morphemes attached to the root word often begin with consonants themselves, thus increasing their likelihood at these junctures.

Massachusett uses /hk/, /hkʷ/, /hp/, /hpw/, /hs/, /hsw/, /hʃ/, /hʃw/, /htʲ/, /htʃ/, /htw/, /hw/, /mw/, /nw/, /pw/, /sk/, /skʷ/, /sp/ and /ʃk/. In the rare dialects that permitted syncopation, combinations such as /kskʷ/, /ths/, /skʷ/, /ks/, /kʷs/, /skʷh/ and /mʃ/ have been recorded in the literature, although some examples from translations of the Book of Psalms that were intended to be sung were forcibly altered to fit the meter of the music. The Massachusett word, wussuhquohhonk (wusuhqahôk /wəsəhkʷahɔ̃k/, 'writing' or 'book') was altered to wussukwhonk (*wusuhqhôk /wəsəhkʷhãk/), yielding a cluster /hkʷh/.

== Prosody ==
Stress in the language is unknown, but Massachusett likely had a stress system similar to extant languages, such as Ojibwe, Algonquin, Mi'kmaq, Munsee and Unami. In Ojibwe, the rule is as follows: A metrical foot consists of two syllables, ideally with the stress on the second syllable. All long vowels are stressed, and when they occur in the weaker syllable of a metrical foot, the syllable that contains them is counted as its own foot and counting begins on the next syllable pair, and the last syllable is always stressed.

In M'ikmaq, Unami and Munsee, languages that are more closely related to Massachusett, the rules are a little more complex. In these languages, metrical feet consist of two syllables or morae, forming either strong right-foot iambs or strong left-foot trochees. Primary stress generally falls on either the rightmost (iambic) or leftmost (trochaic) syllables, but there are numerous exceptions. Unlike the Ojibwe system, these Eastern Algonquian languages allow for word-final unstressed syllables. Long vowels tend to be stressed, but may be shortened when long vowels fall in the weaker position. Long vowels and short syllables in the strong part of the foot receive secondary stress. Stressed words, especially the primary stress, are pronounced louder and at a higher pitch, with secondary stress the effects less so. Because Massachusett, generally, does not undergo vowel syncope, weak vowels can receive secondary stress and entire words can consist of weak, short vowel syllables as in Mi'kmaq and Unami.

- weyaus (weeyâws) /ˈwiː ˌjaːws/, ('flesh')
- sépꝏ (seepuw) /ˈsiːp ˌəw/, ('river')
- sábahég (sâpaheek) /ˈsaːp aˌhiːk/, ('soup')
- wampanoag (wôpanâak) /ˌwãp an ˈaː ak/, ('Wampanoag')
- keen (keen) /ˈkiːn/, ('you')
- askꝏk (ask8k) /ask ˈuːk/, ('snake')
- mishoon (muhsh8n) /ˈməhʃ ˌuːn/, ('canoe')
- kuttuntantamummin (kutunantamumun) /ˌkə tə ˈnan ˌtam əm ˌən/, ('we (inclusive) think')
- peyaumꝏash (peeyômuwash) /ˌpiː ˈjãm ˌəw ˌaʃ/, ('they come' or 'they are coming')
- ohkeomꝏs (âhkeeôm8s) /ˌaːhk ˈiː ˌãm ˌuːs/, ('bee')
- waskétop (waskeetôp) /ˈwask ˌiː ˌtãp/, ('man')
- mockus (mahkus) /ˈmahk əs/, ('shoe')

== Phonological processes ==
=== Vowel affection ===
A /j/ is inserted before vowels that follow /n/, /ht/, /t/ or /h/, only when these consonants in turn come after the vowels /iː/ or /ə/ This /j/ is written with a single ⟨e⟩ in both the colonial and modern orthographies of the Massachusett language. This is not triggered in every instance, but it generally occurs when the short vowel /ə/ is the weakened form of Proto-Algonquian *i· and *i (both of which merged into Proto-Eastern Alqonquian *i before weakening in Proto-Southern New England Algonquian) or /iː/ which did not undergo weakening.

- nepitt (neeput) /niːpət/, ('my tooth') and nepitteash (neeputeash) /niːpətjaʃ/, ('my teeth') from PA *ni·piči (singular) via PEA *nīpītar (plural).
- sekeneam or sekunyam (seekuneam) /siːkənjam/ ('she/he refuses to') from PEA *sīnkīnam.
- wuskannemunneash (wuskaneemuneash) /wəskaniːmənjaʃ/ ('seeds') from PA *[weškin]imi·ni (singular) via PEA *wəθkanīmīnar (plural).
- ogquenneoquss (aquneôqus) /akʷənjãkʷəs/ ('to resemble').

=== Palatization of /k/ ===
Unique to Southern New England Algonquian, the same processes that trigger vowel affection also bring about palatization. When /k/ is followed by an /ə/ that is etymologically a weakened form of PEA *ī, which is in turn followed by either /hp/, /p/, /m/, /hk/ or /k/, the consonant shifts to /tʲ/. Palatization is also triggered when /k/ is followed by /aː/, which derives from PEA *ē, and /əw/, which remains unchanged from PEA *əw. The palatization of /k/ followed by /ə/ is common, but in Massachusett, /k/ is often restored before /aː/ and /əw/ by analogy to prevent excessive alteration of forms. In the colonial orthography, this was represented by ⟨ch⟩, ⟨dj⟩, ⟨j⟩, ⟨te⟩, ⟨ti⟩, ⟨ty⟩, or simply ⟨t⟩ before ⟨u⟩. In the modern orthography, ⟨ty⟩ represents /tʲ/, the palatization of ⟨k⟩, and ⟨te⟩ represents /t/ followed by the /j/ of the following affected vowel, or /t/ + /j/[vowel]; this has the same pronunciation, but is distinguished for etymological reasons.

- wetu (weetyuw), /wiːtʲəw/ ('home') from PA *wi·kiwa·ʔmi, but week[u] (weekuw) /wiːkəw/, ('it is her/his home').
- sachem (sôtyum) /sãtʲəm/ ('chief') from PA *sa·kima·wa but sonksquaw (sôkusqâ) /sãkəskʷaː/, ('female chief').
- keteau (keetyâw) /kiːtʲaːw/ ('he/she recovers') from PEA *kīkēw.
- pittu (putyuw) /pətʲəw/, ('pitch' or 'gum') from PEA *pəkəw.
- -uhpeteog[un] (-uhpeetyâk[an]) /əhpiːtʲaːk[an]/, ('rib') from PA *spike·kani.

== Historical phonology ==
Consonant and consonant cluster development from PA
PA	PEA	PSNEA	Mass.
*p		*p	/p/
*mp		*p	/p/
*t		*t	/t/
*nt		*t	/t/
*č		*č	/tʃ/
*nč		*č	/tʃ/
*hč	*hč		/htʃ/
*ˀč	*hč		/htʃ/
*k		*k, *ty	/k/, /tʲ/
*nk		*k	/k/, /tʲ/
*s	*s	*s	/s/
*x	*s	*s	/s/
*š		*s	/s/
*nš		*s	/s/
*ns		*s	/s/
*ç	*r	*s	/s/
*m		*m	/m/
*ˀm	*hm	*m	/m/
*hm	*hm	*m	/m/
*l	*r	*r, *š	/n/, /ʃ/
*θ	*r	*r, *š	/n/, /ʃ/
*w			/w/
*kw			/kʷ/
*hk		*hk	/hk/
*hx		*hk	/hk/
*xh		*hk	/hk/
*čk	*sk	*hk	/hk/
*θk	*xk	*sk	/sk/
*šk		*sk	/sk/
*çk	*rk	*sk	/sk/
*hp		*hp	/hp/
*xp		*hp	/hp/
*šp	*šp	*sp	/sp/
*čp	*šp	*sp	/sp/
*θp	*šp	*sp	/sp/
*çp	*rp	*sp	/sp/
*ht	*ht		/ht/
*ˀt	*ht		/ht/
*hs	*hs		/hs/
*ˀs	*hs		/hs/
*hš	*hš	*hš	/hʃ/
*ˀš	*hš	*hš	/hʃ/
*ˀl	*hr	*hš	/hʃ/
*nl	*hr	*hš	/hʃ/
*nθ	*hr	*hš	/hʃ/
*hl	*hx	*hš	/hʃ/
*hθ	*hx	*hš	/hʃ/
*ˀθ	*hx	*hš	/hʃ/
*nl	*h, *hr	*r, *h, *š	/n/, /h/, /ʃ/

The most ancient reconstructed ancestor of the Massachusett language is Proto-Algic, believed to have been spoken circa 5000 BC in what is now the Northwest Plateau region, such as the inland regions of the Pacific Northwest along the Columbia River separated from the coast by rugged mountains. Movements of people and competition for resources, shifts to other languages that developed or arrived in the region pushed the Algic languages out of their original homeland. The only known non-Algonquian Algic languages are Yurokan and Wiyotan, known only from the current languages Yurok and Wiyot, which despite sharing cultural similarities and inhabiting adjacent areas of the northernmost coastal area of California, their languages are relics of a historically more widespread group of languages which diverged in the very distant past.

From an unknown Algic ancestor, Proto-Algonquian emerged sometime around 1000 BC, posited to have been spoken anywhere from the foothills of the Rocky Mountains of Montana or an area just west of the Great Lakes. The Algonquian languages spread, covering southern Canada and the northern half of the United States from the Rocky Mountains to the Atlantic Ocean. Around 1000 AD, Proto-Eastern Algonquian emerged, probably somewhere in southern Ontario about the Great Lakes region, and spread from the Maritimes to the Carolinas and separated by speakers of Iroquoian languages. The Eastern languages, which are the only genetic grouping to have emerged from Algonquian, can be further differentiated.

Proto-Eastern Algonquian had a daughter language, Proto-Southern New England Algonquian, which is the ancestor of all the languages of southern New England and most of Long Island. This includes related languages such as Nipmuc, Mohegan-Pequot, Niantic, Narragansett and Quiripi-Naugatuck. The timeline for the development of PSNEA is unclear, but it might be linked to the local adoption of corn, beans and squash agriculture slowly introduced from the south. When Massachusett emerged as a spoken language is unclear, but by the 1400s, cultural practices and peoples would probably be recognizable to the Pilgrims and Puritans that encountered their descendants two centuries later.

=== Consonant development ===
The most striking feature in the development of Proto-Eastern Algonquian was the collapse of PA *θ and *l into PEA *r. As a result, reconstructed PA *aθemwa ('dog') and **e·likwa ('ant') become PEA *arəm and *e·ri·kw, respectively. This is in contrast to Arapaho heθ (he3, 'dog'), which preserves PA *θ and the 'Illu' dialects of western Montagnais (Innu) eylig and the 'Irru' dialect of the Atikamekw eyrig (since PA *l was most likely realized as [r] in most Algonquian languages, or a fricative [ɬ] that was somewhere between [θ] and [l]). Note that PSNEA inherited *arəm unaltered, but either reduplication or an unknown prefix, PA *e·ri·kw yields Massachusett anuneks or annuncks (possibly */aː[nə]nəkw[ee]s/ with diminutive suffix) instead of expected PSNEA *a·nəkw.

In consonant clusters, however, PA *θ and *l behave very differently. Proto-Algonquian *Cθ generally yields *Cx, save PA *nθ which develops into PEA *hr. In clusters of PA *θC, most merge into PEA *sC with the exception of PA *θp which is realized as PEA *šp. Very few PA clusters of *Cl are permitted. The development of PA *ˀl to PEA *hr is expected, but PA *hl falls into PEA *hx and PA *nl is even more erratic. Under normal development, *nl would yield PEA *hr, but it morphs into *h in transitive inanimate singular imperatives. Furthermore, PA *ˀl, *nl and *nθ > PEA *hr, *PA *hl, *hθ and *ˀθ > PEA *hx.

Other general mergers include the collapse of PA *hC and *ˀC into PEA *hC. For example, PA *ht and *ˀt > PEA **ht and PA *ht, PA *hp and *ˀp > PEA **hp and *hč and *ˀč > PEA **hč. With the exception of *nl and *nθ, all instances of PA *nC are retained in PEA. Proto-Algonquian *ç develops into *r in PEA even in clusters. PA *č before *p and *k altered to PEA *š and *s, respectively. Also, PA *x and *s merge into PEA *s. Proto-Eastern Algonquian also prefers to drop PA *w and *y after consonants and clusters in PEA, but these are often restored by analogy when there are inflectional endings. For example, PA *maθkwa > PEA *maxk > PSNEA *mask > Massachusett mosk (masq) /mask/, but Massachusett mosgquak (masqash) /maskʷash/.

In the development of Proto-Southern New England Algonquian, several notable developments take place, especially in regards to PEA *r. In PEA, all instances of *r that descend from PA *ç must have been unstable or had a unique treatment in PEA as they all shifted to PSNEA *s, e.g., PA *ç > PEA *r > PSNEA *s, PA *çk > PEA *rk > PSNEA *sk and PA *çp > PEA *rp > PSNEA *sp. Clusters from PEA with *r also show the same instability. Whereas PEA *r yields PSNEA *r, in final positions, it becomes PSNEA *š, most noticeable in treatments of inanimate plurals. For example, PA *meçkw- > PEA *mərkw- > PSNEA *məskw- > Massachusett musqu (mushq-), 'red.' But also PA *mehθo·θši > PEA *məhxo·r > PSNEA *məhšo·r > Massachusett mishoon (muhsh8n) /məhʃuːn/.

In a similar vein, PEA *hr, *hš and *hx all merge into PSNEA *hš. As a result of these mergers, the sound of /ʃ/ was preserved in PSNEA, since PEA *s and *š merge in PSNEA as *s. Even PEA *nš and *šp yield PSNEA *s and *sp, respectively. For example, PA *le·hle- > PEA *re·hxe- > PSNEA *ra·hš > Massachusett náhsh- (nâhsh-) /naːhʃ/ and PEA *wi·nkwe·hre·w > PSNEA *wi·kwahš > Massachusett wégquosh (weeqahsh) /wiːkʷaːʃ/

A major development is the palatization of PEA *k. As described in other sections, this causes a shift to PSNEA *ty in restrictive environments. For example, PA *kakakiwa > PEA *kakakiw > PSNEA *kąkątyəw > Massachusett kôkontu (kôkôtyuw) /kãkãtʲəw/, 'crow.' Furthermore, PEA *sk undergoes palatization to PSNEA *hč. For example, PA *niswineθke·k > PEA *ni·sinǝxke·k (northern PEA *ni·sinǝške·k and possibly even *ni·sinǝske·k in New England PEA) > PSNEA *ni·sǝnǝhča·k > Massachusett nesnehchag (neesnuhchâk) /niːsnəhtʃaːk/, 'twenty' (literally 'two [pairs of] hands'). Otherwise, the typical development of PA *θk is PSNEA *sk.

In the development of Massachusett from PSNEA, a few noticeable differences arise. Mainly, PSNEA *r is /n/ in Massachusett dialects, but within the SNEA languages, there are varieties that have replaced PSNEA *r with /l/ (Nipmuc), /j/ (Niantic), /n/ (some Narragansett dialects) or retained historical /r/ (Quiripi). For instance, PSNEA *arəm ('dog') was Massachusett anum, Narragansett ayimp, Nipmuc alum, and Quiripi arum. Massachusett preserves final PEA *r as /ʃ/ and the general merger of PSNEA merger of *s and *š, but [ʃ] re-appears as an allophone of /s/, probably due to the influence of emerging /hʃ/ and /ʃ/ in other environments, but the alteration may have varied by dialect or perhaps imparted some unknown semantic meaning.

The instability of PA *nl is also preserved. While it tends to follow that it evolves into PEA *hr and then it should yield PSNEA *hš, however, it seems to have, in certain words, evolved into PEA *r or *h, especially in transitive inanimate second person imperative verbs but appears in Massachusett as /n/, /s/ or /ʃ/ (and not /hʃ/), however, words in this category seem to have been altered by analogy to other words, such as PA *no·nle·waki > PEA *no·hre·wak > PSNEA *no·ra·wak > Massachusett nꝏnáog (n8nâwak) /nuːnaːwak/, 'she suckles them' or 'she nurses them', or appears as /h/ or /s/.

=== Vowel development ===
Vowel development from Proto-Algonquian
PA	PEA	PSNEA	Mass.
*i	*i·	*i·, *ə	/iː/, /ə/
*i·	*i·	*i·, *ə	/iː/, /ə/
*e	*ə		/ə/
*e·		*a·	/aː/
*a			/a/
*a·		*ą	/ã/
*o	*o·		/uː/
*o·	*o·		/uː/

The vowels of Proto-Algonquian were very symmetric, comprising short vowels *a, *e, *i and *o followed by their long counterparts *a·, *e·, *i· and *o·. These remained relatively intact in some of the Central Algonquian languages, but were radically restructured in most of the Plains Algonquian languages and Eastern Algonquian languages.

Both PA *i and *o are lost and merge into their long counterparts in PEA, e.g., PA *i and *i· > PEA *i· and PA *o and *o· > PEA *o·. Proto-Algonquian *e alters to PEA *ə but PA *a, *a· and *e· remain unchanged. This left PEA Algonquian with two short vowels *a and *ə and four long vowels *a·, *e·, *i· and *o·.

Proto-Southern New England Algonquian kept the PEA vowels *a, *ə and *o· unaltered. Proto-Eastern Algonquian *e· shifted to PSNEA *a·. However, PEA *a· was lost, instead it was altered to the PSNEA nasal vowel *ą. Although this appears to be diagnostic of the SNEA languages, the intrusive nasal is possibly a feature shared with Algonquian. The PEA long vowel *i· underwent some alteration. When not in the initial syllable of a word, and probably in an unstressed position often shortened to PSNEA *ə, a process that may also trigger vowel affection and /k/ palatization.

The vowel inventory of PSNEA *a, *a·, *ą, *ə, *i· (which are equivalent to their Massachusett phonological representation /a/, /aː/, /ã/, /ə/ and /iː/, respectively) is retained, but PSNEA *o· becomes *uː or /uː/. This is reflected by the double-o ligature ⟨ꝏ⟩ or the digraph ⟨oo⟩ in the colonial-era documents and ⟨8⟩ in the modern orthography implemented by the WLRP. Eliot claimed that the double o ligature was pronounced like English book and mood, both of which were also pronounced /oː/ before shifting to /uː/, but the word book was probably still pronounced closer to [buːk] than current [bʊk] in Eliot's time, as the effects of the Great Vowel Shift in English were still going on, and may reflect Eliot's use of ⟨o⟩ in his earliest Massachusett writings, whereas the majority use ⟨ꝏ⟩. Eliot also used ⟨ꝏ⟩ for what has been reconstructed as /əw/, especially word-medial or word-final positions, and /wə/ or /ə/ word initially. However, in the modern orthography, ⟨8⟩ is only used for what can be traced back to developments from Proto-Algonquian *o·.

=== Development examples ===
Development from Proto-Algonquian
English	PA	PEA	PSNEA	Massachusett (Eastern)	Ojibwe (Central)	Arapaho (Plains)
'woods,' 'thickets'	*meˀtekwari	*məhtəkwar	*məhtəkwaš	mehtugquosh (muhtuqash) /məhtəkʷaʃ/	mitigwakiwan	neeyeici
'worm'	*o·xhwe·wa	*o·xhw	*o·hkw	ꝏhk (8hq) /uːhk/	ookwe ('maggot')	hi'iiisoo ('maggot')
'fox'	*wa·kwehsa	*wa·kwəhs	*wąkwəhs	wonquiss (wôquhs), /wãkʷəhs/	-waagosh (compounds)	beexouu
'snake'	*aθko·ka	*axko·k	*asko·k	askꝏk (ask8k), /askuːk/	ginebig (unrelated)	siisiiyei
'fish'	*name·ˀsa	*name·hs	*nama·hs	namohs (namâhs) /namaːhs/	namens (Alberta dialects)	neb
'three'	*neˀθw-	*nəhxw-	*nuhšw-	nushw- (nuhshw-) /nəhʃw/	niswi	neeso
'strawberries'	*wete·himiniari	*wəte·hi·mi·ni·ar	*wəte·hi·mənyaš	wettohimunneash (wutâheemuneash) /wətaːhiːmənjaʃ/	ode`iminan	hiteehibino
'duck'	*ši·ˀši·pa	*ši·hši·p	*si·hsi·p	seaseepe (seehseep) /siːhsiːp/	zhiishiib ('fat flightless duck')	siisiiko
'bowstring'	*aˀta·pya	*ahta·p	*ahtąp	ohtop (ahtôp) /ahtãp/	achaab (Northwest dialects)	beete
'house'	*wi·kiwa·ˀmi	*wi·ki·w[a·hm]	*wi·tyəw	wetu (weetyuw) /wiːtjəw/	wiigiwaam	ho'oowu
'earth,' 'land'	*ačkyi	*aski·	*ahki·	ohke (ahkee) /ahkiː/	aki	ho'oeet ('clay')
