= Everybody Makes Mistakes (Shearwater album) =

Studio album by Shearwater
- Released: October 1, 2002
- Genre: Indie rock
- Label: Misra Records

Shearwater chronology
The Dissolving Room (2001)	Everybody Makes Mistakes (2002)	Winged Life (2004)

Professional ratings
Review scores
Source	Rating
AllMusic	4/5 stars
Pitchfork	6.5/10
Uncut	1.5/5 stars

Everybody Makes Mistakes is Shearwater's second full-length album. It was released on October 1, 2002, on Misra Records.

== Track listing ==
1. "An Accident" (Jonathan Meiburg) – 2:31
2. "Well, Benjamin" (Will Sheff) – 3:15
3. "Soon" (Jonathan Meiburg) – 2:33
4. "Room for Mistakes" (Will Sheff) – 4:30
5. "12:09" (Jonathan Meiburg) – 3:25
6. "Mistakes" (Will Sheff) – 2:17
7. "The Ice Covered Everything" (Jonathan Meiburg) – 3:20
8. "You Took Your Mistakes Too Hard" (Jonathan Meiburg) – 1:48
9. "Wreck" (Will Sheff) – 3:13
10. "Safeway" (Will Sheff) – 3:40
11. "All the Black Days 1" (Jonathan Meiburg) – 1:22
12. "All the Black Days 2" (Jonathan Meiburg) – 4:23
