= Stone Tapes =

End of world music label

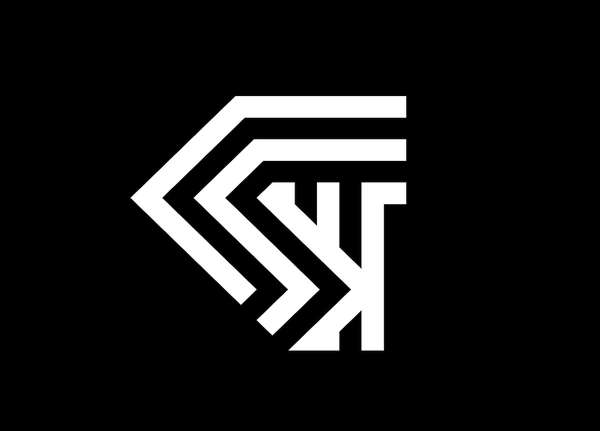
- Founded: 2022
- Founder: Yonatan Gat
- Distributor: Secretly Canadian
- Genre: End of world music, Scorched earth music et al.
- Country of origin: United States, Israel
- Location: Indianapolis, Indiana, New York City
- Official website: stonetapes.com

Stone Tapes is an independent record label, music collective and imprint of Joyful Noise Recordings curated by Yonatan Gat. The label was founded in 2022, branching off of Joyful Noise's artist-in-residence program, and emerged from visions and insights arising in conversations between players, producers, promoters, journalists and other indigenous artistic peers around the eponymously titled Medicine Singer's LP, which ultimately evolved into Stone Tapes' debut release.

== History ==
As Stone Tapes recorded and began to tour its first releases and art projects, collaborators internal to the collective took to calling the new approach "End of World Music" or "Scorched Earth Music."

Stone Tapes was founded to offer indigenous musicians more control over their recordings and careers, in reaction to the perceived failings of the world music genre as practiced by major record labels. Another factor was allegations of white supremacist rhetoric made against factions of the American right during the Trump administration. A new and more collective approach, balancing traditional spirit with radical new forms of musical experimentation would be the mission of Stone Tapes. As Daryl Black Eagle Jamieson said, reflecting on the Medicine Singers release, "I think it's a completely new realm of music."

In the summer of 2022, The New York Times printed a feature about Indigenous artists, whether affiliated with Stone Tapes or not. Discussed were Joe Rainey Sr. of Niineta and unaffiliated (Pulitzer prize winning composer of "Voiceless Mass"; Raven Chacon (Diné), Laura Ortman (White Mountain Apache); Suzanne Kite (Lakota); Warren Realrider (Pawnee); Nathan Young (Delaware Tribe/Kiowa/Cherokee Nation); Postcommodity, Ajilvsga, and others). The articles includes a meditation on the shift in tone from one of the Medicine Singers' Daryl Black Eagle Jamieson, a member of the unrecognized Pocasset Wampanoag Tribe of the Pokanoket Nation, appearing at a climax in the cycle of reflections included in the article that recalled a conversation with the mentor who taught him elements of the Wampanoag and Algonquian dialects among other things:

"...Jamieson, worried [that the experimental approach] might bend those historic sounds until they broke. A 62-year-old Air Force veteran who learned the Massachusett language only as an adult, Jamieson asked his mentor, Donald Three Bears Fisher, to approve the lyrics for “Daybreak,” the album’s first single and an ecstatic aubade with pounding drums. 'He said, I want it played everywhere,' Jamieson remembered... Fisher died in 2020. 'So that’s what I’m doing.'"

Other releases from the first year of the Stone Tapes label/collective include releases by Maalem Hassan BenJaafar "Moroccan gnawa master of Innov Gnawa fame", Mamady Kouyaté "Guinean guitar legend, formerly of Bembeya Jazz", Yonatan Gat's American Quartet "featuring Mikey Coltun of Mdou Moctar, Greg Saunier of Deerhoof, and Curt Sydnor", and the legendary (and occasionally "exiled") Israeli punk band Monotonix.

== See also ==
- List of record labels
