= Not Yet (Monotonix album) =

Studio album by Monotonix
- Released: January 25, 2011
- Recorded: January, April, July 2010
- Genre: Garage rock
- Label: Drag City
- Producer: Steve Albini

Monotonix chronology
Where Were You When It Happened? (2009)	Not Yet (2011)

Not Yet is the second full-length album by Israeli band Monotonix released January 25, 2011 on Drag City records. It was recorded by Steve Albini in Electrical Audio studio in Chicago over 3 sessions in January, April and July 2010.

At the time of the album's release critics were halved by the primitive aesthetics, punk minimalism, and Albini's raw production, with the likes of Pitchfork and Spin Magazine expressing disappointment, but Prefix Magazine claiming "they now seem concerned with commanding your respect just as much as your hips" and Zaptown naming it an "iconic punk album for the times". PopMatters went as far as "The romance and mystery in Gat's guitar set 'em apart. Monotonix trust their rock chops enough to let in some beauty and softness along the way, and that's what makes them, but make no mistake, they'll still flatten everyone in the room."

== Track listing ==
1. "Nasty Fancy" - 3:08
2. "Everything That I See" - 2:30
3. "Before I Pass Away" - 2:49
4. "Blind Again" - 4:02
5. "Fun Fun Fun" - 2:05
6. "Give Me More" - 3:03
7. "You and Me" - 4:28
8. "Try Try Try" - 2:43
9. "Late Night" - 5:27
10. "Never Died Before" - 2:30

== Reviews ==
- PopMatters Review
- Consequence of Sound Review
- Prefix Review
