= Palo Santo (Shearwater album) =

Studio album by Shearwater
- Released: May 9, 2006
- Genre: Indie rock
- Label: Misra Records

Shearwater chronology
Thieves (EP) (2005)	Palo Santo (2006)	Rook (2008)

2007 Re-release Cover

Professional ratings
Review scores
Source	Rating
AllMusic	3.5/5 stars
The Guardian	2/5 stars
Pitchfork	(7.6/10)
Prefix	(8.0/10)

Palo Santo is an album by Shearwater, released in 2006 on Misra Records. The album was re-released in an expanded, partly re-recorded, fully remastered and repackaged edition in 2007 on Matador Records. The album was inspired by the life and death of the singer Nico; Jonathan Meiburg mentions this on the album The Island Arc Live (Excerpts), in a recording from Shearwater's January 15, 2011, performance at Austin's Central Presbyterian Church.

== Critical reception ==
The New York Times wrote that "this is one of the year's best indie-rock albums ... These 11 flickering — and hummable — songs tell a desperate but not quite decipherable story." NME called the album "both magnificent and bewildering," writing that "meandering piano and plucked banjo laments wind towards dramatic crescendos, songs fracture and split as if powered by dream logic."

== Track listing ==
All tracks composed by Jonathan Meiburg (except "Special Rider Blues").

=== 2006 release ===
1. "La Dame et la Licorne" – 5:19
2. "Red Sea, Black Sea" – 2:58
3. "White Waves" – 4:21
4. "Palo Santo" – 3:45
5. "Seventy-four, Seventy-five" – 3:21
6. "Nobody" – 3:02
7. "Sing, Little Birdie" – 3:10
8. "Johnny Viola" – 2:30
9. "Failed Queen" – 5:51
10. "Hail, Mary" – 5:11
11. "Going Is Song" – 3:41

=== 2007 re-release ===
The release includes new versions of the tracks "La Dame et la Licorne," "Red Sea, Black Sea," "Seventy-four, Seventy-five," "Johnny Viola," and "Hail Mary," remastered versions of the other tracks retained from the original 2006 release, and a bonus CD containing demos and miscellaneous tracks.

==== Disk 1 ====
1. "La Dame et la Licorne" – 5:27
2. "Red Sea, Black Sea" – 3:09
3. "White Waves" – 4:20
4. "Palo Santo" – 3:48
5. "Seventy-four, Seventy-five" – 3:24
6. "Nobody" – 3:01
7. "Sing, Little Birdie" – 3:10
8. "Johnny Viola" – 2:29
9. "Failed Queen" – 5:50
10. "Hail, Mary" – 6:16
11. "Going Is Song" – 3:42

==== Disk 2 ====
1. "My Only Boy" - 4:39
2. "Every Hook, Every Eye" - 2:20
3. "Special Rider Blues" (Skip James Cover) - 5:21
4. "Sing, Little Birdie" (Demo) - 3:05
5. "Palo Santo" (Demo) - 3:45
6. "Discontinuities" - 3:41
7. "Red Sea, Black Sea" (Demo) - 3:10
8. "Failed Queen" (Demo) - 6:27
