= Winged Life =

Studio album by Shearwater
- Released: March 16, 2004
- Genre: Indie rock
- Label: Misra

Shearwater chronology
Everybody Makes Mistakes (2002)	Winged Life (2004)	Thieves (EP) (2005)

Professional ratings
Review scores
Source	Rating
Allmusic	4/5 stars

Winged Life is Shearwater's third full-length album, released on March 16, 2004, on Misra Records.

== Track listing ==
1. "A Hush" (Jonathan Meiburg) – 4:17
2. "My Good Deed" (Will Sheff) – 5:52
3. "Whipping Boy" (Jonathan Meiburg) – 4:42
4. "The Kind" (Jonathan Meiburg) – 2:50
5. "A Makeover" (Will Sheff) – 5:00
6. "St. Mary's Walk" (Jonathan Meiburg) – 3:15
7. "Wedding Bells Are Breaking up That Old Gang of Mine" (Will Sheff) – 6:26
8. "(I've Got a) Right to Cry" (Jonathan Meiburg) – 3:38
9. "The World in 1984" (Jonathan Meiburg) – 3:01
10. "The Convert" (Will Sheff) – 2:45
11. "Sealed" (Jonathan Meiburg) – 3:48
12. "The Set Table" (Will Sheff) – 6:40
