= William Schaff =

American artist and musician

William J. Schaff Jr. is an American artist and musician based in Warren, Rhode Island and Oakland, California. He is known for artwork for the bands Okkervil River, Songs: Ohia, Godspeed You! Black Emperor, and The Mighty Mighty Bosstones.

== Art ==
Much of Schaff's art deals with death and loss, as well as the consequences of, and responses to, human violence. Stories from the Old Testament and scenes from The Holocaust are recurrent in his art. Schaff works in paintings, drawings, collages, scratchboards, mail art, motion pictures, and comics.

A graduate of the Maryland Institute College of Art, Schaff has exhibited and lectured at numerous institutions, including the United States Air Force Academy, the Rhode Island School of Design, Amherst College, and East Carolina University.

=== Music-related art ===
Schaff is a prolific artist for musicians and is best known for producing all the art for the Jagjaguwar releases of Okkervil River. In 2009, he was the subject of Pitchfork's "Take Cover" feature, which discusses notable album art. In 2012, a book of Schaff's artwork, featuring introductions by John Darnielle of The Mountain Goats, Will Sheff of Okkervil River, and Darren Jackson of Kid Dakota, was published by Graveface Records. It includes a vinyl recording of previously unreleased songs by Jason Molina.

==== Art discography ====
- 2026: Magnolia & Johnson Electric Co. (with MJ Lenderman), Live in Ashville
- 2025: Chris Welch, Discarded Lives, Forgotten Names
- 2025: Magnolia & Johnson Electric Co, The Big Beast
- 2024: Mark Ciani, Four Stages
- 2024: Sentiments, If This Is What You Want
- 2024: Blankslate, Lookout Mountain Charley
- 2023: The Pines of Rome, The Unstruck Bell
- 2023: AJJ, Disposable Everything
- 2023: Nesting, Drag all the Lights Inside
- 2022: Michael Tarbox, Kingdom Come Blues
- 2022: Mark Ciani, King of Death Returns
- 2022: Mark Ciani, King of Death
- 2022: Social Caterpillar, When You Woke Up to Dances of Light
- 2021: Halfgrass, Raw Hackles
- 2021: Viking Jesus, Before the Mutation
- 2021: Zeb Gould, Destroyer Deliver
- 2020: Jason Molina, Eight Gates
- 2019: Stone Irr, Performance
- 2019: Strand of Oaks, map insert for Pope Kildragon reissue
- 2018: M. Lockwood Porter, Communion in the Ashes
- 2018: Okkervil River, vinyl label decals for In the Rainbow Rain
- 2018: Goshen Electric Co., The Gray Tower/Ring the Bell 7"
- 2017: Waxahatchee/Kevin Morby, Farewell Transmission/The Dark Don't Hide It 7"
- 2017: The Low Cards, The Low Cards
- 2017: Jason Molina, The Black Sabbath Covers 7"
- 2017: Gian Luca & The Oak, Flowers Never Grown
- 2017: Andrew Cohen & Light Coma, Unreality
- 2016: What Cheer? Brigade, You Can't See Inside of Me
- 2016: Tyler Daniel Bean, On Days Soon to Pass
- 2016: The Casket Girls, Night Machines
- 2016: Jason Molina, I'll Be Here in the Morning/Tower Song 7"
- 2015: Brown Bird, Axis Mundi
- 2015: Heather Aubrey Lloyd, A Message in the Mess, Volume One EP
- 2014: Swearing at Motorists, While Laughing, the Joker Tells the Truth
- 2014: Okkervil River, The Silver Gymnasium
- 2014: O'Death, Out of Hands We Go
- 2014: The Wooly Moon, The Mountain 7"
- 2014: Guy Capecelatro III, Scatter the Remains
- 2013: Allysen Callery, Mumblin' Sue
- 2013: Junior Varsity Arson, Waiver
- 2013: Six Star General, Hair Supply
- 2013: Assembly of Light Choir, Assembly of Light Choir
- 2013: The Casket Girls, The Casket Girls EP
- 2013: Brown Bird, Fits of Reason
- 2013: Dan Baker, Pistol in My Pocket
- 2012: John 3:16, Visions of the Hereafter - Visions of Heaven, Hell and Purgatory
- 2012: Our Orthodox, We Are Not the Only Ones
- 2012: Brown Bird/Joe Fletcher, I Love You and I Miss You (Dan Blakeslee tribute album)
- 2011: Okkervil River, Your Past Life As a Blast 7"
- 2011: Okkervil River, Rider 7"
- 2011: Okkervil River, Wake and Be Fine 7"
- 2011: Brown Bird, Salt for Salt
- 2011: Okkervil River, Mermaid 12"
- 2011: Kid Dakota, Listen To The Crows As They Take Flight
- 2011: Okkervil River, I Am Very Far
- 2010: Our Orthodox, Our Orthodox
- 2010: Monster Movie, Everyone Is a Ghost
- 2010: Dreamend, So I Ate Myself, Bite By Bite
- 2009: The Mighty Mighty Bosstones, Pin Points and Gin Joints
- 2008: Okkervil River, Lost Coastlines 7"
- 2008: Kid Dakota, A Winner's Shadow
- 2008: Okkervil River, The Stand Ins
- 2007: Okkervil River, The Stage Names
- 2006: Okkervil River, Overboard & Down EP
- 2006: Monster Movie, All Lost
- 2005: Okkervil River, Black Sheep Boy Appendix
- 2005: Dreamend, Maybe We're Making God Sad and Lonely
- 2005: Okkervil River, For Real (There's Nothing Quite Like the Blinding Light)
- 2005: Okkervil River, Black Sheep Boy
- 2004: Gravenhurst, Black Holes in the Sand
- 2004: Kid Dakota, The West Is the Future
- 2004: Sharron Kraus, Songs of Love and Loss
- 2003: Songs: Ohia, The Magnolia Electric Co.
- 2003: Gravenhurst, Flashlight Seasons
- 2003: Kitchen Cynics, Parallel Dog Days
- 2003: Kid Dakota, Get Her Out of My Heart 7"
- 2003: Alec K. Redfearn and the Eyesores, Every Man for Himself and God Against All
- 2003: Okkervil River, Down the River of Golden Dreams
- 2002: Alec K. Redfearn and the Eyesores, Bent at the Waist
- 2002: Okkervil River, Don't Fall in Love with Everyone You See
- 2000: Godspeed You! Black Emperor, Lift Your Skinny Fists Like Antennas to Heaven
- 1999: Alec K. Redfearn and the Eyesores, May You Dine on Weeds Made Bitter by the Piss of Drunkards

== Music ==
Schaff led two acts as vocalist and songwriter, Reformation and Noel the Coward, and was part of the musical ensemble I Love You and I Miss You. He also played guitar and percussion with The Eyesores, The Iditarod, and Black Forest/Black Sea. Most recently, he was the drumming ape "Dead Chop Chop" in the What Cheer? Brigade.

== Fort Foreclosure ==
Schaff lives and works in a house that he bought with a modest amount of money left to him by his father after his passing. The house has been in foreclosure multiple times and has been nicknamed "Fort Foreclosure" by Schaff and its other residents. In an attempt to raise funds to solve the problem, Schaff launched a partially-successful Indiegogo fundraising campaign in March 2014.
