= I Am Very Far =

- Cover Art by William Schaff

Studio album by Okkervil River
- Released: May 10, 2011
- Genre: Indie rock, folk rock
- Length: 50:59
- Label: Jagjaguwar
- Producer: Will Sheff

Okkervil River chronology
The Stand Ins (2008)	I Am Very Far (2011)	Golden Opportunities 2 (2011)

Singles from I Am Very Far
- 1. "Mermaid"; 2. "Rider"; 3. "Wake and Be Fine"; 4. "Your Past Life as a Blast"

I Am Very Far is the sixth album by Okkervil River, released on May 10, 2011. It was produced primarily in Austin, Connecticut and Brooklyn by lead singer Will Sheff with John Congleton and Phil Palazzolo.

== Recording and production ==
I Am Very Far marked a distinct break from the polished, hyper-literary folk-rock that Okkervil River had explored on their previous two albums, The Stage Names and The Stand Ins. In the words of songwriter Will Sheff, "I found myself wanting to not be accessible and not be crowd pleasing and basically be self-pleasing and follow what I thought was really interesting." This is the first Okkervil River album that Sheff produced, following his production of Roky Erickson's 2010 album True Love Cast Out All Evil. From this experience, Sheff attests to gaining "a kind of chaotic, powerful energy that swirls around Roky that I started to feel infecting my own writing and my own sonic ideas and desires."

In the studio, the band experimented with various recording methods in each session, including fastforwarding and rewinding a cassette tape and then doubling the noises on electric guitar, tearing off strips of duct tape for percussion, singing while strolling around the room, and hurling file-cabinets across the studio. Some songs had input from a vast number of session musicians playing in the same room, such as "Rider" or "We Need a Myth", the latter of which opens with the strumming of 45 classical guitars.

Lyrically, I Am Very Far is also a sharp departure from their previous work. Whereas previous albums were often composed of highly literate take on rock legends and tropes, this album's lyrics tend to portray dark and indistinct dreamscapes. Sheff explained that "interiority is a really important thing to me, and a lot of this record did come from a subconscious, unconscious place, and I wanted it to respond to that corresponding place in listeners... I wanted it to really feel like it was operating on a subterranean level."

== Reception ==
Professional ratings
Aggregate scores
Source	Rating
Metacritic	79/100
Review scores
Source	Rating
AllMusic	4/5 stars
The A.V. Club	A−
Drowned in Sound	9/10
The Guardian	4/5 stars
NME	6/10
Pitchfork Media	7.9/10
PopMatters	8/10
Slant	4.5/5 stars
Spin	8/10
Under the Radar	9/10 stars

I Am Very Far has received mostly positive reviews. On the review aggregate site Metacritic, the album has a score of 80 out of 100, indicating "Generally favorable reviews".

Sputnikmusic wrote "I Am Very Far is certainly a more enthralling listen than The Stand Ins was; though it may lack some of the emotional impact of Down the River of Golden Dreams, or especially Black Sheep Boy, the album remains a welcomed addition into the work of a band who commands great quality-control." Jim Scott of Under the Radar called the album "...one of the best records of the year," writing "I Am Very Far makes a strong case for Sheff to be considered one of the very best writers in music today." Scott concluded: "...looking at this stretch of recordings with such a finite lens is doing them a disservice: this is music to cherish forever." Some reviewers praised the band for pursuing a new sound on the album, with Erik Adams of The A.V. Club writing "It's no longer the Okkervil River of The Stage Names or Black Sheep Boy, and that's a plus: I Am Very Far signals that the band's gifts with song and sentiment were never tied to specificity." Slant Magazine's Jaymie Baxley also gave the album a positive review, writing "Fans who approach I Am Very Far carrying expectations informed by the group's earlier releases will no doubt find this to be Okkervil River's most challenging work to date, but it's also the group's most grandiose, thrilling, and brilliant."

Tiny Mix Tapes, on the other hand, was less receptive to the band's new sound, writing "But rather than serve as a radical departure for Okkervil River, I Am Very Far treads familiar ground with a superficial extroversion that can't match the emotional particularity of the rest of the band's back catalog." In another mixed review, Philip Cosores of One Thirty BPM called I Am Very Far Okkervil River's "...weakest album to date." Cosores continued: "I Am Very Far is often a noisy album, seeming experimental, but ultimately just poorly edited, with the songs overly busy and taking the focus away from the songwriting and lyrics that are Sheff's strengths."

== Track listing ==
All tracks are written by Will Sheff.

No.	Title	Length
1.	"The Valley"	3:50
2.	"Piratess"	4:00
3.	"Rider"	4:25
4.	"Lay of the Last Survivor"	3:51
5.	"White Shadow Waltz"	4:26
6.	"We Need a Myth"	4:38
7.	"Hanging from a Hit"	5:16
8.	"Show Yourself"	5:20
9.	"Your Past Life as a Blast"	5:32
10.	"Wake and Be Fine"	3:25
11.	"The Rise"	6:16

== Personnel ==
The following people contributed to I Am Very Far:

Okkervil River

- Will Sheff - vocals, acoustic guitars, Wurlitzer electric piano, cassette deck, glockenspiel, electric guitar (6), additional electric guitar (3,4,6,9,11), piano (1), additional drums (1), sampler (1,4,5,9), file cabinet
- Scott Brackett - cornet, Juno synthesizer, manipulated samples, vibraphone, second piano (3,6,10,11)
- Brian Cassidy - vocals, second electric guitar (2,3,9,10), fourth acoustic guitar (6), string arrangements
- Lauren Gurgiolo - electric guitars, third acoustic guitar (6)
- Jonathan Meiburg - vocals, angklung
- Patrick Pestorius - vocals, bass
- Justin Sherburn - piano, pump organ, Farfisa, Rhodes and Helpinstill electric piano, accordion, Arp synthesizer, second electric guitar (8), horn arrangements
- Cully Symington - drums, percussion

Guest musicians

- Joy Askew - vocals (3,7,11)
- Nicole Atkins - vocals (3,7,11)
- Stephen Belans - tympani, second drum kit (3,6,10)
- Mike Booher - vocals (9)
- William Braun - cello
- Alexis Buffum - violin
- Audrey Easley - flute
- Jeanene Ioppolo Johnson - clarinet
- Jeff Johnston - second acoustic guitar (3,6,10)
- Ben Kalb - cello (3,9)
- Paul Klemperer - saxophone, clarinet (2)
- Justin Kurys - viola
- Sharon Lacey - oboe
- Ben Lance - third electric guitar (3,10), fifth acoustic guitar (6)
- Will Landin - tuba
- Ephraim Owens - trumpet
- Phil Palazzolo - duct tape, whistling, additional electric guitar (5), additional piano (5), sampler (10)
- Sarah Pizzichemi - violin
- Brendan Ryan - piano (5,11), accordion (5)
- Sara Scurry - bassoon
- Zachary Thomas - second bass (3,6,10)
- Raul Vallejo - trombone
- Beth Wawerna - vocals (3,4,7,11)

== Charts ==
Chart (2011)	Peak position
Norwegian Albums (VG-lista)	23
Swedish Albums (Sverigetopplistan)	51
UK Albums (OCC)	66
US Billboard 200	32
US Independent Albums (Billboard)	5
US Top Alternative Albums (Billboard)	6
US Top Rock Albums (Billboard)	10
US Indie Store Album Sales (Billboard)	8
