= Sham Wedding / Hoax Funeral =

Studio album by Okkervil River and Shearwater
- Released: April 2004
- Recorded: 2004
- Genre: Indie rock, folk rock
- Label: Jagjaguwar
- Producer: Okkervil River, Shearwater

Okkervil River chronology
Down the River of Golden Dreams (2003)	Sham Wedding / Hoax Funeral (2004)	Sleep and Wake-Up Songs (2004)

Shearwater chronology
Winged Life (2004)	Sham Wedding / Hoax Funeral (2004)	Thieves (2005)

Sham Wedding/Hoax Funeral is a split CD featuring Austin, Texas "brother bands" Okkervil River and Shearwater. It was first available only at North American tour dates in the spring and summer of 2004, but fans later were able to purchase it online. The tracks include demos, unreleased songs and old standards. Mark Pedini, former drummer of Okkervil River, provided the artwork for the album cover.

The song "Murderess" was later released in different form as "Piratess" on Okkervil River's 2011 album I Am Very Far.

== Track listing ==
Sham Wedding by Okkervil River

1. "See See Rider" (Ma Rainey, Lena Arant) – 4:56
2. "Murderess" – 5:02
3. "Moonshiner" – 1:59
4. "Willow Tree" – 3:53
5. "Unravel" (Björk, Guy Sigsworth) – 4:42

Hoax Funeral by Shearwater

1. "All the Pretty Horses" (traditional) – 4:26
2. "Happy Song for My Friends" – 2:47
3. "Cool My Blood" – 4:46
4. "Mountain Laurel" – 2:22
5. "Trouble in Mind" (Richard M. Jones) – 3:47
6. "Never Come Again" – 3:44
