= A Dream in the Dark: Two Decades of Okkervil River Live =

Live album by Okkervil River
- Released: September 18, 2020
- Recorded: October 9, 2006 – July 19, 2019
- Genre: Indie rock
- Label: ATO Records

Okkervil River chronology
In the Rainbow Rain (2018)	A Dream in the Dark: Two Decades of Okkervil River Live (2020)

A Dream in the Dark: Two Decades of Okkervil River Live is a live box set by American rock band Okkervil River. The box set was released by ATO Records on October 30, 2020, composed of 24 tracks (on 4 discs). It was released electronically on 18 September 2020. Like other Okkervil River albums, the accompanying artwork is the work of artist William Schaff, and references several other Okkervil River album covers. The title refers to a line from "Unless It's Kicks".

== Background ==
In April 2019, Okkervil River announced A Dream in the Dark, a series of twelve live albums, digitally recorded from throughout the band's history, to be released monthly to subscribers. In September 2020, it was announced that a condensed version including highlights from the series was to be released as a single album.

== Track listing ==
All tracks are written by Will Sheff.

LP One
No.	Title	Location	Length
1.	"Westfall" (October 13, 2006)	Iron Horse Music Hall, Northampton, Massachusetts	6:17
2.	"No Key, No Plan" (October 9, 2006)	Blind Pig, Ann Arbor, Michigan	7:19
3.	"Kansas City" (October 13, 2006)	Iron Horse Music Hall, Northampton, Massachusetts	7:41
4.	"Listening to Otis Redding at Home During Christmas" (April 21, 2007)	Hogg Memorial Auditorium, Austin, Texas	7:30
5.	"For Real" (April 21, 2007)	Hogg Memorial Auditorium, Austin, Texas	7:07
6.	"It Ends With a Fall" (April 16, 2008)	Toad's Place, Richmond, Virginia	5:16
Total length:			41:10

LP Two
No.	Title	Location	Length
1.	"Our Life is Not a Movie or Maybe" (April 16, 2008)	Toad's Place, Richmond, Virginia	6:42
2.	"Unless It's Kicks" (August 9, 2008)	Haldern Pop, Rees-Haldern, Germany	6:22
3.	"It Was My Season" (November 1, 2013)	First Avenue (nightclub), Minneapolis, Minnesota	5:44
4.	"Down Down the Deep River" (29 October 2013)	The Filling Station, Bozeman	6:44
5.	"Lost Coastlines" (October 29, 2013)	The Filling Station, Bozeman	6:33
6.	"A Stone" (November 22, 2015)	Bowery Ballroom, New York, New York	5:39
Total length:			37:44

LP Three
No.	Title	Location	Length
1.	"Another Radio Song" (November 23, 2015)	Bowery Ballroom, New York, New York	5:27
2.	"Okkervil River R.I.P." (November 8, 2016)	Le Botanique, Brussels, Belgium	7:15
3.	"Judey on a Street" (November 8, 2016)	Le Botanique, Brussels, Belgium	9:39
4.	"So Come Back, I am Waiting" (November 8, 2016)	Le Botanique, Brussels, Belgium	8:03
5.	"Okkervil River Song" (May 6, 2017)	The Triple Door, Seattle, Washington	5:45
6.	"The Surgeon Above the Arbor" (May 6, 2017)	The Triple Door, Seattle, Washington	9:08
Total length:			45:17

LP Four
No.	Title	Location	Length
1.	"Skiptracer" (September 24, 2018)	Debaser Medis, Stockholm, Sweden	8:00
2.	"Black" (October 10, 2018)	The Garage, London, England	5:34
3.	"Pink-Slips" (September 24, 2018)	Debaser Medis, Stockholm, Sweden	3:56
4.	"External Actor" (July 19, 2019)	The Sinclair, Cambridge, Massachusetts	6:17
5.	"Mary on a Wave" (July 15, 2019)	The Hamilton Live, Washington, DC	8:50
6.	"Your Past Life as a Blast" (July 19, 2019)	The Sinclair, Cambridge, Massachusetts	8:23
Total length:			41:00
