= The Stand Ins =

- Cover Art by William Schaff

Studio album by Okkervil River
- Released: September 9, 2008
- Genre: Indie rock
- Length: 40:12
- Label: Jagjaguwar
- Producer: Brian Beattie

Okkervil River chronology
| Golden Opportunities Mixtape (2007) | The Stand Ins (2008) | I Am Very Far (2011) |

The Stand Ins is the fifth full-length studio album by American indie rock band Okkervil River, released on September 9, 2008. The album is the second half of The Stage Names, a planned double album. The title comes from the term 'stand-in', a person who substitutes for the actor before filming for technical purposes. If the cover art for The Stage Names is placed above that of The Stand-Ins, a complete picture is formed. The album charted at #42 with 11,000 copies sold, according to the Billboard 200.

Shearwater's Jonathan Meiburg and guitarist Charles Bissell of The Wrens contributed to the album.

== Overview ==
Conceived as a companion piece to The Stage Names, The Stand Ins continued the band's preoccupation with pop culture, celebrity suicide, and life as a musician. The track "Lost Coastlines", which features a duet with Shearwater's Jonathan Meiburg, deals with trying to keep the band together despite the band's constant touring. "Starry Stairs" depicts the life and suicide of porn star Shannon Wilsey. The final track on The Stand Ins, "Bruce Wayne Campbell Interviewed on the Roof of the Chelsea Hotel, 1979," details the career and disillusionment of glam rock musician Bruce Wayne Campbell (better known as Jobriath).

== Reception ==
Professional ratings
Aggregate scores
| Source | Rating |
|---|---|
| Metacritic | 78/100 |
Review scores
| Source | Rating |
| AllMusic | 3.5/5 stars |
| Drowned in Sound | 8/10 |
| Entertainment Weekly | A |
| Pitchfork | 8.0/10 |
| PopMatters | 9/10 stars |
| Robert Christgau | (3-star Honorable Mention) |
| Rolling Stone | 3/5 stars |

The Stand Ins has received positive reviews. The album currently has a score of 78 out of 100 on the review aggregate site Metacritic, indicating "generally favorable reviews".

PopMatters' Joseph Carver praised the album's narrative, writing "Once again, a record made up of relatively unlikeable characters becomes a fixture in your psyche thanks to Will Sheff's ability to find the humanity in their stories." Pitchfork also praised the album's lyrics, with reviewer Stephen Deusner calling Sheff "...one of the best lyric-writers going in indie rock." Deusner continued: "Song for song, he can jerk a tear with a carefully observed detail or turn of phrase... but it's the way those songs talk to one another that makes Okkeril River albums so durable and fascinating."

In a less positive review, Melanie Haupt of The Austin Chronicle criticized the album for being unpolished and unfocused, writing "The Stand Ins doesn't really figure out what it wants to be until its second half." In another mixed review, Magnet's Chris Barton also criticized the album for being unfocused, writing "Okkervil River can deliver terrific songs when ambitions are kept in balance, but this uneven record is in dire need of an editor."

== Track list ==
All tracks are written by Will Sheff.

| No. | Title | Length |
|---|---|---|
| 1. | "Stand Ins, One" | 0:47 |
| 2. | "Lost Coastlines" | 5:31 |
| 3. | "Singer Songwriter" | 3:49 |
| 4. | "Starry Stairs" | 4:01 |
| 5. | "Blue Tulip" | 6:18 |
| 6. | "Stand Ins, Two" | 0:31 |
| 7. | "Pop Lie" | 3:12 |
| 8. | "On Tour with Zykos" | 4:54 |
| 9. | "Calling and Not Calling My Ex" | 4:21 |
| 10. | "Stand Ins, Three" | 0:54 |
| 11. | "Bruce Wayne Campbell Interviewed on the Roof of the Chelsea Hotel, 1979" | 5:54 |

== Personnel ==
The following people contributed to The Stand Ins:

Okkervil River

- Will Sheff – Casio, composer, acoustic, electric and rhythm guitar, keyboards, photography, vocals
- Charles Bissell – electric guitar
- Scott Brackett – audio engineer, cornet, editing, engineer, Hammond B3, Mellotron, Hammond organ, percussion, synthesizer, vocals
- Brian Cassidy – arranger, electric guitar, mandolin, pedal steel, string arrangements, vocals
- Jonathan Meiburg – banjo, piano, vocals, Wurlitzer
- Justin Sherburn – carillon, Hammond B3, Mellotron, piano, vocals
- Travis Nelsen – claves, clavinet, drums, maracas, sleigh bells, tambourine, vocals
- Patrick Pestorius – bass, melodica, vocals
- Zachary Thomas – mandolin

Technical personnel

- Brian Beattie – audio production, engineer, electric guitar, Mellotron, percussion, producer, synthesizer
- Felix Beattie – audio engineer
- Brad Bell – audio engineer, engineer
- Roger Seibe; – mastering
- Stuart Sullivan – audio engineer, engineer
- Paul Mahern – audio engineer, engineer

Additional musicians

- Caitlin Bailey – cello
- Mike Hoffer – trombone, trumpet
- Scott Jackson – violin
- David Lobel – alto and baritone saxophone
- Katie Nott – viola
- Kathleen Pittman – violin
- Sarah Pizzichemi – violin
- Francesca Smith – French horn
- Will Thothong – viola
- Tammy Vo – violin

Additional personnel

- Daniel Murphy – layout design
- William Schaff – artwork
- Tatyana Tolstaya – author

== Charts ==
| Chart (2007) | Peak position |
|---|---|
| Norwegian Albums (VG-lista) | 23 |
| Swedish Albums (Sverigetopplistan) | 57 |
| US Billboard 200 | 42 |
| US Independent Albums (Billboard) | 5 |
| US Top Alternative Albums (Billboard) | 9 |
| US Top Rock Albums (Billboard) | 14 |
| US Indie Store Album Sales (Billboard) | 3 |
