= The Stage Names =

- Cover art by William Schaff

Studio album by Okkervil River
- Released: August 7, 2007
- Genre: Indie rock
- Length: 41:46
- Label: Jagjaguwar
- Producer: Brian Beattie

Okkervil River chronology
Overboard and Down (2006)	The Stage Names (2007)	Golden Opportunities Mixtape (2007)

The Stage Names is the fourth full-length studio album by American indie rock band Okkervil River, released on August 7, 2007. The album was recorded in Austin, Texas, with longtime Okkervil producer Brian Beattie, and with mixing from Spoon drummer and producer Jim Eno. Like other Okkervil River albums, the accompanying artwork is the work of artist William Schaff. The cover refers to a line from "Unless It's Kicks". The record was also released as a limited-edition 2-CD set that included a second disc of solo acoustic demos. A newly recorded version of "Love to a Monster", which appeared in rough demo form on the band's tour EP, Overboard and Down, was originally intended to appear on the album, but didn't make it on, and appears as a bonus track when the album is purchased through eMusic. "Shannon Wilsey on the Starry Stairs", described by lead singer and songwriter Will Sheff as "kind of a sequel to 'Savannah Smiles' and kind of a sister song to "John Allyn Smith Sails'", is included as a bonus track when the album is purchased through iTunes.

== Overview ==
The Stage Names was originally conceived as a double album. Sheff said about the inspiration for the album,

"There's this idea of living in a world of pop culture history, high art history and low art history, full of images that are extremely common and meaningful to people but are essentially empty and disembodied. I wanted the record to exist in a universe of reference of signals, signs and bullshit."

An official music video was created for "Our Life Is Not a Movie or Maybe" directed by Margaret Brown.

"A Hand to Take Hold of the Scene" describes the television shows in which Okkervil River's music has been featured. These include a 2006 episode of Cold Case ("One Night") and an episode of Breaking Bonaduce.

"Savannah Smiles" is a song that deals with the life and death of Shannon Wilsey, a pornographic actress known by her stage name, Savannah, which was taken from the 1982 film, Savannah Smiles. The bonus track, "(Shannon Wilsey on the) Starry Stairs," is intended to be a sequel to "Savannah Smiles."

"Plus Ones" references several other songs with numerical titles by adding 1 to them. These include ? and the Mysterians' "96 Tears," Nena's" 99 Luftballons," Paul Simon's "50 Ways to Leave Your Lover," The Byrds' "Eight Miles High," R.E.M.'s "7 Chinese Bros.," David Bowie's "TVC15," The Zombies' "Care of Cell 44," Commodore's "Three Times a Lady," and The Crests' "Sixteen Candles." The term is also used in reference to guest-lists at rock concerts.

"You Can't Hold the Hand of a Rock and Roll Man" makes a passing reference to The Bride Stripped Bare By Her Bachelors, Even by Marcel Duchamp. The title itself is taken from a line in the Joni Mitchell song, "Blonde in the Bleachers."

The song name "Title Track" is an openly self-reflexive gesture. The song also references Kenneth Anger's book Hollywood Babylon.

"John Allyn Smith Sails" concerns the life and suicide of confessional poet John Berryman (originally John Allyn Smith). The song ends by reworking the traditional folk song "Sloop John B", likening death to a journey back home.

In addition to these specific allusions, several songs on the album have subjects like television, film, and the experience of being in a rock band.

Will Sheff has stated that he originally intended the album to be a double album and that he wrote twice as many songs for it than were used, many of which were completed or nearly completed. He had also stated that the band intended to release an EP of the unused material similar to Black Sheep Boy's companion EP Black Sheep Boy Appendix; however enough material existed for a full-length LP called The Stand Ins, which was released on September 9, 2008.

== Reception ==
Professional ratings
Aggregate scores
Source	Rating
Metacritic	82/100
Review scores
Source	Rating
AllMusic	4/5 stars
Alternative Press	4.5/5 stars
The A.V. Club	B+
Entertainment Weekly	B+
The Guardian	4/5 stars
Mojo	4/5 stars
NME	7/10
Pitchfork	8.7/10
Q	4/5 stars
Spin	3.5/5 stars

Reviews have been largely positive with Pitchfork labeling The Stage Names "Okkervil River's most emotionally devastating record yet, and without doubt one of the year's best" and placing it at No. 22 in their list of the best albums of 2007. The Stage Names has a Metacritic rating of 82. The album debuted at number 62 on the Billboard 200 with 10,000 copies sold. Harp Magazine listed the CD as the best of 2007 and the UK's now-defunct Teletext music magazine Planet Sound listed the album at No. 6 in their best albums of 2007. "Our Life is not a Movie or Maybe" was No. 81 on Rolling Stone's list of the 100 Best Songs of 2007.

== Track listing ==
All tracks are written by Will Sheff.

No.	Title	Length
1.	"Our Life Is Not a Movie or Maybe"	4:23
2.	"Unless It's Kicks"	4:38
3.	"A Hand to Take Hold of the Scene"	3:59
4.	"Savannah Smiles"	3:38
5.	"Plus Ones"	3:43
6.	"A Girl in Port"	6:36
7.	"You Can't Hold the Hand of a Rock and Roll Man"	4:53
8.	"Title Track"	5:22
9.	"John Allyn Smith Sails"	4:33

=== Bonus tracks ===
- "(Shannon Wilsey on the) Starry Stairs" – 3:54

Bonus track available on iTunes

- "Love to a Monster" – 4:54

Bonus track available on eMusic

== Musicians ==
- Will Sheff - Vocals, Acoustic Guitar, Electric Guitar, Xylophone, Piano
- Scott Brackett - Coronet, Hammond Organ, Synthesizer, Mellotron, Percussion
- Brian Cassidy - Vocals, Electric Guitar, Pedal Steel, Xylophone
- Jonathan Meiburg - Vocals, Piano, Wurloutzer, Pump Organ, Mellotron, Electric Guitar
- Travis Nelsen - Drums, Maracas, Tambourine, Shells
- Patrick Pestorius - Bass, Piano, Woodblocks
- Zachary Thomas - Mandolin
- Caitlin Bailey - Cello
- Scott Jackson - Violin
- Katie Nott - Viola
- Kathleen Pittman - Violin
- Sarah Pizzicheni - Violin
- Frances Smith - French Horn, Clarinet
- Will Thothong - Viola
- Tammy Vo - Violin

== Charts ==
Chart (2007)	Peak position
French Albums (SNEP)	179
US Billboard 200	62
US Independent Albums (Billboard)	5
US Top Alternative Albums (Billboard)	19
US Top Rock Albums (Billboard)	17
US Indie Store Album Sales (Billboard)	4
