= Away (album) =

Studio album by Okkervil River
- Released: September 9, 2016
- Genre: Indie rock
- Length: 57:13
- Label: ATO
- Producer: Will Sheff

Okkervil River chronology
Golden Opportunities 3 (2013)	Away (2016)	In the Rainbow Rain (2018)

Away is the eighth studio album by American rock band Okkervil River, released on September 9, 2016. This album is the band's second release on ATO Records, following their previous studio album The Silver Gymnasium.

The album features a number of guest artists, including Marissa Nadler, former band member and current Shearwater frontman Jonathan Meiburg, and classical music ensemble yMusic. The album was recorded in New York and mixed by Jonathan Wilson.

The recording of the album came in the wake of a number of professional and personal changes in frontman Will Sheff's life, including changes in backing band members and the death of his grandfather. Sheff described the recording process and the resulting music as follows: "Eventually, I realized I was kind of writing a death story for a part of my life that had, buried inside of it, a path I could follow that might let me go somewhere new."

A video for the album's opening track 'Okkervil River R.I.P' was released on July 6, 2016. The video was directed by Will Sheff and shot in upstate New York.

The album artwork is taken from artist Tom Uttech's painting Nin Maminawendam.

== Reception ==
Professional ratings
Aggregate scores
Source	Rating
Metacritic	79/100
Review scores
Source	Rating
AllMusic	3.5/5 stars
The Austin Chronicle	4/5 stars
Consequence of Sound	B+
The Guardian	3/5 stars
Pitchfork	7.0/10
Slant Magazine	3/5 stars
Under the Radar	8.5/10

Away received mostly positive reviews. On Metacritic, the album has a score of 79 out of 100 based on 17 critics, indicating "generally favorable reviews".

Slant Magazine's David Sackllah called the album "a tremendous achievement that captures sentiments of loss, isolation, and searching for a belonging in a way that only a writer with a keen eye and empathetic nature as Sheff's could fully articulate." John Everhart of Under the Radar also gave the album a positive review, writing "Away is a comeback album for a band that never really went away, a gorgeous collection of ballads that is the Okkervil River of your dreams." In a mixed review, The Guardian's Harriet Gibsone wrote "A fragmented, frustrated mindset has contributed to a sprawling, inconsistent album with brief flourishes of verdant beauty."

== Track listing ==
No.	Title	Length
1.	"Okkervil River R.I.P."	6:41
2.	"Call Yourself Renee"	7:07
3.	"The Industry"	4:31
4.	"Comes Indiana Through the Smoke"	4:45
5.	"Judey on a Street"	7:16
6.	"She Would Look for Me"	7:03
7.	"Mary on a Wave"	5:11
8.	"Frontman in Heaven"	7:44
9.	"Days Spent Floating (In the Halfbetween)"	6:55
Total length:		55:53

== Charts ==
Chart (2016)	Peak position
Belgian Albums (Ultratop Flanders)	132
New Zealand Heatseekers Albums (RMNZ)	10
Scottish Albums (OCC)	62
US Americana/Folk Albums (Billboard)	13
US Independent Albums (Billboard)	22
US Top Alternative Albums (Billboard)	22
US Top Rock Albums (Billboard)	28
US Indie Store Album Sales (Billboard)	8
US Vinyl Albums (Billboard)	16
