= So Pretty =

So Pretty may refer to:

- So Pretty (song), a 1968 song by Leonard Bernstein
- So Pretty (album), a 2002 album by Kid Dakota, or the title song
- So Pretty, a 1962 album by Herbie Steward
- So Pretty, a 2004 EP by The Charms
