= Don't Fall in Love with Everyone You See =

Studio album by Okkervil River
- Released: January 22, 2002
- Recorded: 2001
- Genres: Indie rock, folk rock
- Length: 46:13
- Label: Jagjaguwar
- Producer: Okkervil River

Okkervil River chronology
| Stars Too Small to Use (1999) | Don't Fall in Love with Everyone You See (2002) | Down the River of Golden Dreams (2003) |

Professional ratings
Review scores
| Source | Rating |
|---|---|
| AllMusic | 3/5 stars |
| Pitchfork Media | 7.2/10 |

Don't Fall in Love with Everyone You See is the first full-length studio album from alternative folk-rock group Okkervil River. Released on January 22, 2002 on the label Jagjaguwar, it contains the single "Kansas City". Artist William Schaff, not to be confused with lead singer Will Sheff, designed the cover art. The album features an array of instruments including violin, pedal steel, mellotron, banjo, string and horn sections.

The mandolin murder ballad "Westfall" stems from Sheff's recollections of the Yogurt Shop Murders, four grotesque murders of teenage girls in Austin, Texas by college students, and the subsequent trials. The song was written around the lines "They're looking for evil / Thinking they can trace it / But evil don't look like anything."

== Track listing ==
All tracks are written by Will Sheff.

| No. | Title | Length |
|---|---|---|
| 1. | "Red" | 3:40 |
| 2. | "Kansas City" | 5:45 |
| 3. | "Lady Liberty" | 3:41 |
| 4. | "My Bad Days" | 6:21 |
| 5. | "Westfall" | 5:54 |
| 6. | "Happy Hearts" (featuring Daniel Johnston) | 4:17 |
| 7. | "Dead Dog Song" | 3:59 |
| 8. | "Listening to Otis Redding at Home During Christmas" | 6:36 |
| 9. | "Okkervil River Song" | 5:56 |

== Personnel ==
Okkervil River

- Jonathan Meiburg – Bass, accordion, tambourine, wurlitzer
- Will Sheff – Vocals, guitar, mellotron, harmonica, organ ("Dead Dog Song")
- Zachary Thomas – Mandolin, bass (electric), vocals, string bass
- Seth Warren – Drums, vocals, spoons, taragat

Guest musicians

- Alex Arcone – Saxophone ("Red")
- Ethan Azarian – Banjo
- Brian Beattie – Organ, organ (Hammond)
- Scott Blesner – Violin
- Michael Crow – Trumpet ("Lady Liberty")
- Peter Elliot – Trumpet ("Lady Liberty")
- Daniel Johnston – Vocals ("Happy Hearts")
- Channing Lewis – Saxophone ("Lady Liberty")
- Gary Newcomb – Pedal steel
- Ashley Rath – Violin ("Listening to Otis Redding at Home During Christmas")
- June Rhee – Violin ("Listening to Otis Redding at Home During Christmas")
- Alice Spencer – Vocals
- Brian Standefer – Cello ("Listening to Otis Redding at Home During Christmas")

Technical personnel

- Brian Beattie – Producer, engineer, mixing
- Mark Pedini – Layout design
- William Schaff – Artwork, layout design
- Will Sheff – Layout design
- Billy Stull – Mastering
