= In the Rainbow Rain =

Studio album by Okkervil River
- Released: April 27, 2018
- Length: 48:49
- Label: ATO Records
- Producer: Will Sheff

Okkervil River chronology
| Away (2016) | In the Rainbow Rain (2018) | A Dream in the Dark: Two Decades of Okkervil River Live (2020) |

Professional ratings
Aggregate scores
| Source | Rating |
|---|---|
| AnyDecentMusic? | 6.5/10 |
| Metacritic | 68/100 |
Review scores
| Source | Rating |
| AllMusic | 3/5 stars |
| Drowned in Sound | 7/10 |
| Exclaim! | 6/10 |
| God Is in the TV | 7/10 |
| The Line of Best Fit | 6.5/10 |
| MusicOMH | 3/5 stars |
| Paste | 7.8/10 |
| Pitchfork | 6.9/10 |
| PopMatters | 7/10 |
| Slant Magazine | 2.5/5 stars |

In the Rainbow Rain is the ninth studio album by American indie band Okkervil River. The album was released on ATO Records on April 27, 2018.

== Release ==
On February 12, 2018, Okkervil River announced the release of their new album for April 27, 2018, alongside the first single "Don't Move Back to L.A.". On March 20, 2018, the second single "Pulled Up The Ribbon" was released, along with a music video. The music video features Sarah Pedinotti. On April 11, 2018, the band released the music video for "Don't Move Back to L.A.". The third single "Famous Tracheotomies" was released on April 16, 2018.

== Critical reception ==
In the Rainbow Rain was met with "generally favorable" reviews from critics. At Metacritic, which assigns a weighted average rating out of 100 to reviews from mainstream publications, this release received an average score of 68, based on 18 reviews. Aggregator Album of the Year gave the release a 66 out of 100 based on a critical consensus of 16 reviews.

== Track listing ==
Standard edition
| No. | Title | Writer(s) | Length |
|---|---|---|---|
| 1. | "Famous Tracheotomies" | Will Sheff; Ray Davies | 4:55 |
| 2. | "The Dream and the Light" | Sheff | 6:49 |
| 3. | "Love Somebody" | Sheff; Benjamin Lazar Davis; Will Graefe | 4:13 |
| 4. | "Family Song" | Sheff | 5:10 |
| 5. | "Pulled up the Ribbon" | Sheff | 4:11 |
| 6. | "Don't Move Back to L.A." | Sheff | 4:38 |
| 7. | "Shelter Song" | Graeffe; Sheff | 4:59 |
| 8. | "How It Is" | Sheff | 3:34 |
| 9. | "External Actor" | Sheff | 4:08 |
| 10. | "Human Being Song" | Sheff | 6:12 |
| Total length: | | | 48:49 |

== Personnel ==
Okkervil River

- Benjamin Lazar Davis – bass guitar (tracks 1, 2, 5–10), vocals (3, 6–9), Moog synthesizer (3, 4); ARP synthesizer, drum programming (3); piano (9)
- Will Graefe – electric guitar (all tracks), vocals (tracks 3, 6–9), acoustic guitar (8)
- Jeremy Gustin – congas (tracks 1, 4, 7), percussion (1, 7), finger cymbals (9)
- Sarah Pedinotti – RMI keyboard (tracks 1, 3, 7, 10), Waldorf synthesizer (1, 10), Oberheim synthesizer (2, 3, 7), Moog synthesizer (2, 8), vocals (3–10), piano (4, 8), Roland synthesizer (4, 9); Mellotron, Wurlitzer (5); Hammond organ (7), ARP synthesizer (8, 10)
- Will Sheff – vocals, production, additional engineering (all tracks), drum programming (tracks 1, 4, 7, 8), piano (1, 10), acoustic guitar (2–6, 9, 10), Roland synthesizer (3, 5, 7, 8, 10), upright piano (3), Mellotron (4, 5, 9, 10), electric guitar (5, 10), Wurlitzer (6), artwork
- Cully Symington – drums (all tracks), shaker (1), percussion (2, 3, 5, 6, 8)

Additional musicians

- Brittany Anjou – glockenspiel (track 3), vibraphone (7)
- Simone Appleby – backing vocals (tracks 1–3, 7, 10)
- Leslie Gardner – backing vocals (1–3, 7, 10)
- Cole Kamen–Green – trumpet (tracks 2, 8, 9), mellophone (2, 9), vocals (8)
- Chris Kyle – electric guitar (tracks 1, 10)
- Frank LoCrasto – Wurlitzer (tracks 1, 3); grand piano, tack piano (3); Fender Rhodes (4, 7, 10), ARP synthesizer (7)
- Joe McGinty – synthesizer programming
- Jonathan Meiburg – vocals (tracks 1–3, 6, 8)
- Rob Moose – string arrangements, violin, viola (tracks 1, 10)
- David Nagler – Roland 2000 synthesizer (track 1)
- Clinton Newman – electric guitar (track 1)
- Phil Palazzolo – piano (track 4)
- Jared Samuel – piano (track 2), Hammond organ (5, 6)
- A Snaggletooth Tiger – horn arrangements
- Alex Spiegelman – saxophone (tracks 2, 4, 8), flute (2, 4, 9), vocals (8), clarinet (9)
- Saundra Williams – backing vocals (tracks 1–3, 7)

Technical

- Rich Bennett – additional engineering
- William Bigwood – additional engineering
- Charles Burst – additional engineering
- Shawn Everett – mixing
- Bob Ludwig – mastering
- Matt Murphy – additional engineering
- Sam Griffin Owens – additional engineering
- Phil Palazzolo – engineering
- Oliver Straus – additional engineering
- Ivan Wayman – additional engineering, mixing assistance

Visuals

- A Horse with No Name – photography
- Jeremy Miranda – cover painting
- Daniel Murphy – design

== Charts ==
Chart performance for In the Rainbow Rain
| Chart (2018) | Peak position |
|---|---|
| US Top Album Sales (Billboard) | 93 |
| US Independent Albums (Billboard) | 15 |
| US Vinyl Albums (Billboard) | 16 |
