= Vicious Vicious =

- Origin: Minneapolis, Minnesota, U.S.
- Genres: Indie pop, soul, R&B, electro-rock
- Years active: 2002–present
- Labels: Twentyseven, The Redemption Recording Company, Plexippus
- Spinoffs: The Hopefuls, Tapes 'n Tapes
- Website: viciousvicious.com

Vicious Vicious is an American indie pop and electro-rock musical band based in Minneapolis, Minnesota, led by musician and producer Erik Appelwick. The band is known for a sound that blends synth-pop, soul, and R&B influences with falsetto vocals. Since its inception in 2002, Vicious Vicious has released seven full-length studio albums.

== Formation and early years (2002–2004) ==
Erik Appelwick founded Vicious Vicious as a solo project in 2002 after moving to Minneapolis from South Dakota. Prior to this, Appelwick had performed as a guitarist and bassist in local acts including Kid Dakota, Camaro, and Alva Star. The project's debut album, Blood and Clover, was recorded largely on a four-track recorder and released independently in 2002 before being picked up by Twentyseven Records in 2003. The debut earned a nomination for Best Rock Album at the Minnesota Music Awards. During early live performances, the project featured a rotating lineup that included drummer Martin Dosh, keyboardist Alex Oana, and musician Darren Jackson.

== Awards and Tapes 'n Tapes (2005–2011) ==
In 2005, Vicious Vicious released the album Don't Look So Surprised via The Redemption Recording Company and Plexippus Records. Appelwick wrote and recorded the material while living in a rehearsal space, focusing on a more upbeat sound compared to his previous work. The album won the Minnesota Music Award for "Locally Released Recording" in September 2005. One of the tracks, "Here Come Tha Police," was later highlighted by The Atlantic as a "Track of the Day" in 2015.

In early 2006, Appelwick joined the band Tapes 'n Tapes as their bassist, shortly before that group achieved international success and signed with XL Recordings. Despite a heavy touring schedule with Tapes 'n Tapes, Appelwick released the third Vicious Vicious album, Parade, in 2007. Parade was listed among the "Top CDs of 2007" by the Minnesota Public Radio station The Current and featured collaborations with drummer Adrian Suarez and bassist Heath Henjum.

== Hiatus and later releases (2012–present) ==
After a five-year gap between recordings, a self-titled fourth album was released in 2012. This album featured a more serious and "earnest" tone, moving away from the "tongue-in-cheek" style of earlier records. The recording sessions included drummer Martin Dosh and bassist James Buckley.

Following a period of relative inactivity, the project returned with the album Gravity in 2020, followed by Paradise in 2022. In February 2025, Vicious Vicious released its seventh studio album, titled I Think We've Got a Situation. Appelwick described the newer material as being influenced by contemporary psychedelic pop artists like Tame Impala while maintaining the project's signature focus on danceable rhythms and soul-inflected bass lines.

== Musical style ==
The music of Vicious Vicious has been described by critics as "skating rink soul" and "feel-good music" that incorporates elements of funk, psychedelia, and lo-fi electronic production. Appelwick frequently utilizes falsetto vocals and hip-hop-influenced beats, a style he initially conceived as mixing contemporary rhythms with "roller-skating music." Reviewers have noted a tension in the music between "primal pop urges" and "shadowy atmospherics."

== Awards and nominations ==
Year	Award	Category	Nominated work	Result	Ref.
2003	Minnesota Music Awards	Best Rock Album	Blood and Clover	Nominated	
2005	Minnesota Music Awards	Locally Released Recording	Don't Look So Surprised	Won	

== Discography ==
- Blood and Clover (2002)
- Don't Look So Surprised (2005)
- Parade (2007)
- Vicious Vicious (2012)
- Gravity (2020)
- Paradise (2022)
- I Think We've Got a Situation (2025)
