= Golden Opportunities 3 =

Studio album by Okkervil River
- Released: December 18, 2013
- Genre: Indie rock, folk rock
- Length: 20:44

Okkervil River chronology
The Silver Gymnasium (2013)	Golden Opportunities 3 (2013)	Away (2016)

Golden Opportunities 3 is a free downloadable EP by indie rock band Okkervil River, containing the covers of five songs. It was released as a free download from the band's website on December 18, 2013. It is a sequel to their 2011 album, Golden Opportunities 2.

Will Sheff's solo acoustic cover of Don Henley's song "The End of the Innocence" created controversy after Henley and his lawyers requested the song be removed from the album. Sheff responded to Henley's remarks in a Rolling Stone article by referring to a tradition of American songwriters such as Bob Dylan and Nina Simone covering and modifying other folk songs.

== Track listing ==
No.	Title	Writer(s)	Length
1.	"Dance Hall Days"	Jack Hues	4:14
2.	"Give Me the Night"	Rod Temperton	3:52
3.	"Money Changes Everything"	Tom Gray	3:48
4.	"Seven Year Ache"	Rosanne Cash	3:34
5.	"The End of the Innocence"	Don Henley	5:16
