= The Silver Gymnasium =

Studio album by Okkervil River
- Released: September 3, 2013
- Genre: Indie rock, folk rock
- Length: 49:04
- Label: ATO
- Producer: John Agnello

Okkervil River chronology
Golden Opportunities 2 (2011)	The Silver Gymnasium (2013)	Golden Opportunities 3 (2013)

The Silver Gymnasium is the seventh album by American indie rock band Okkervil River, released on September 3, 2013. It is the band's first release after signing to ATO Records, and their first album not released through Jagjaguwar.

== Overview ==
The Silver Gymnasium was first announced in June 2013, its name revealed letter-by-letter via the band's website. The record is a concept album which takes place in lead-singer Will Sheff's home-town of Meriden, New Hampshire in 1986. Sheff conceived the album as a tribute to the spirit of pre-adolescence, meant to evoke the nostalgic feeling of, in his words "an action figure you found in the woods." The album's title is taken from the Charles Lewis Silver Memorial Gymnasium found in Meriden's Kimball Union Academy, the boarding school that Sheff attended.

== Reception ==
Professional ratings
Aggregate scores
Source	Rating
AnyDecentMusic?	7.4/10
Metacritic	78/100
Review scores
Source	Rating
AllMusic	4/5 stars
Alternative Press	4/5 stars
American Songwriter	4/5 stars
The A.V. Club	B+
The Guardian	4/5 stars
Mojo	3/5 stars
NME	7/10
Pitchfork	6.8/10
Q	4/5 stars
Uncut	8/10

The album has been given a Metacritic rating of 78 out of 100 based on 32 critics, indicating generally favorable reviews. At Alternative Press, Chris Parker called the album "Often dark, but strangely triumphant."

The album charted at No. 66 on Billboard 200, and No. 7 on the Billboard Tastemaker album chart, selling 5,800 copies in the first week. The album has sold 22,000 copies in the United States as of August 2016.

== Track listing ==
All tracks are written by Will Sheff.

No.	Title	Length
1.	"It Was My Season"	4:26
2.	"On a Balcony"	3:04
3.	"Down Down the Deep River"	6:32
4.	"Pink-slips"	3:39
5.	"Lido Pier Suicide Car"	5:31
6.	"Where the Spirit Left Us"	3:47
7.	"White"	3:06
8.	"Stay Young"	4:19
9.	"Walking Without Frankie"	5:00
10.	"All the Time Every Day"	4:36
11.	"Black Nemo"	4:58

=== Bonus tracks ===
- "Do the Crawl (CBS October 22, 1988)" – 4:43 Vinyl exclusive
- "From a Cutlass Cruiser" – 3:40 Vinyl exclusive

== Charts ==
Chart (2013)	Peak position
US Billboard 200	66
US Top Alternative Albums (Billboard)	15
US Top Rock Albums (Billboard)	20
US Top Tastemaker Albums (Billboard)	7
