= Golden Opportunities 2 =

EP by Okkervil River
- Released: November 28, 2011
- Genre: Indie rock, folk
- Label: Jagjaguwar

Okkervil River chronology
I Am Very Far (2011)	Golden Opportunities 2 (2011)	The Silver Gymnasium (2013)

The Golden Opportunities 2 is a free downloadable EP by indie rock band Okkervil River, containing the covers of five songs – the product of a one-day studio session, recorded onto a two track tape by Danny Reisch at Premium Recording in Austin, Texas. It was released as a free download from the band's website on November 28, 2011. It is a sequel to their 2007 album, Golden Opportunities Mixtape. After self-releasing the first part, Golden Opportunities 2 has been released with the backing of their label, Jagjaguwar.

== Track listing ==
No.	Title	Writer(s)	Length
1.	"It is So Nice to Get Stoned"	Ted Lucas	5:43
2.	"U.F.O."	Jim Sullivan	3:25
3.	"One Soul Less on your Fiery List"	David McComb	4:46
4.	"Plan D"	Bill Fay	3:11
5.	"Dry Bones"	Traditional	5:03
