= Stars Too Small to Use =

EP by Okkervil River
- Released: Summer 1999
- Recorded: 1998
- Genre: Indie rock
- Length: 31:23
- Label: Jound
- Producer: Okkervil River

Okkervil River chronology
| Bedroom EP (1998) | Stars Too Small to Use (1999) | Don't Fall in Love with Everyone You See (2002) |

Professional ratings
Review scores
| Source | Rating |
|---|---|
| Austin Chronicle | 3/5 stars |

Stars Too Small to Use is Okkervil River's second EP, released in mid-1999. It was recorded live over a span of three days in 1998 when the band was still forming. Three of the tracks appeared revised on later recordings: "He Passes Number Thirty-Three" on the 2003 split EP Julie Doiron / Okkervil River, "The Velocity of Saul at the Time of His Conversion" on the 2003 album Down the River of Golden Dreams, and "For the Captain" on the 2005 EP Black Sheep Boy Appendix (as "Another Radio Song").

== Track listing ==
1. "Kathy Keller" - 3:30
2. "The Velocity of Saul at the Time of His Conversion" - 4:27
3. "Oh, Precious" - 5:03
4. "For the Captain" - 5:34
5. "Auntie Alice" - 2:57
6. "Whole Wide World" - 4:07
7. "He Passes Number Thirty-Three" - 5:45
