= Golden Opportunities Mixtape =

Studio album by Okkervil River
- Released: December 12, 2007
- Genres: Indie rock, Folk
- Label: Self Released

Okkervil River chronology
The Stage Names (2007)	Golden Opportunities Mixtape (2007)	The Stand Ins (2008)

The Golden Opportunities Mixtape is a free downloadable EP by indie rock band Okkervil River. It contains eight covers and one live version of an original. It was released without any press as a free download from the band's website on December 12, 2007. It was listed as a Must Have Download in the 1044th Issue of Rolling Stone.

Austin Powell, writing for The Austin Chronicle, praised the album as "marvelous", complete with principal songwriter Will Sheff's personal translation of Serge Gainsbourg's "I Came Here to Say I'm Going Away". When Sheff writes his songs and sing he does it from a "kind of character-based" perspective, "trying to put myself in a different frame of mind than my own. Even in these love songs written by women, I'm trying to retain their point of view."

== Track listing ==
No.	Title	Writer(s)	Length
1.	"April Anne"	John Phillips	4:14
2.	"Simon Smith and the Amazing Dancing Bear"	Randy Newman	2:29
3.	"I Want to Know"	Charles F. Olsen, Ed Sanders	2:57
4.	"Do What You Gotta Do"	Jimmy Webb	3:04
5.	"I Came Here to Say I'm Going Away"	Serge Gainsbourg; translated by Will Sheff	4:33
6.	"The Blonde in the Bleachers"	Joni Mitchell	3:02
7.	"Antarctica Starts Here"	John Cale	2:43
8.	"Listening to Otis Redding at Home During Christmas"	Will Sheff	7:11
9.	"Solo"	Sandy Denny	3:45

== Personnel ==
- Will Sheff - Vocals, Acoustic Guitar, Harmonica
- Scott Brackett - Cornet, Keyboards, Piano on "April Anne"
- Brian Cassidy - Electric Guitar, Pedal Steel, Piano on "Listening to Otis Redding at Home During Christmas"
- Jonathan Meiburg - Vocals, Piano, Accordion
- Travis Nelsen - Drums
- Patrick Pestorius - Bass
- Justin Sherburn - Keyboards on "I Came Here to Say I'm Going Away"
