= Okkervil =

River in Russia

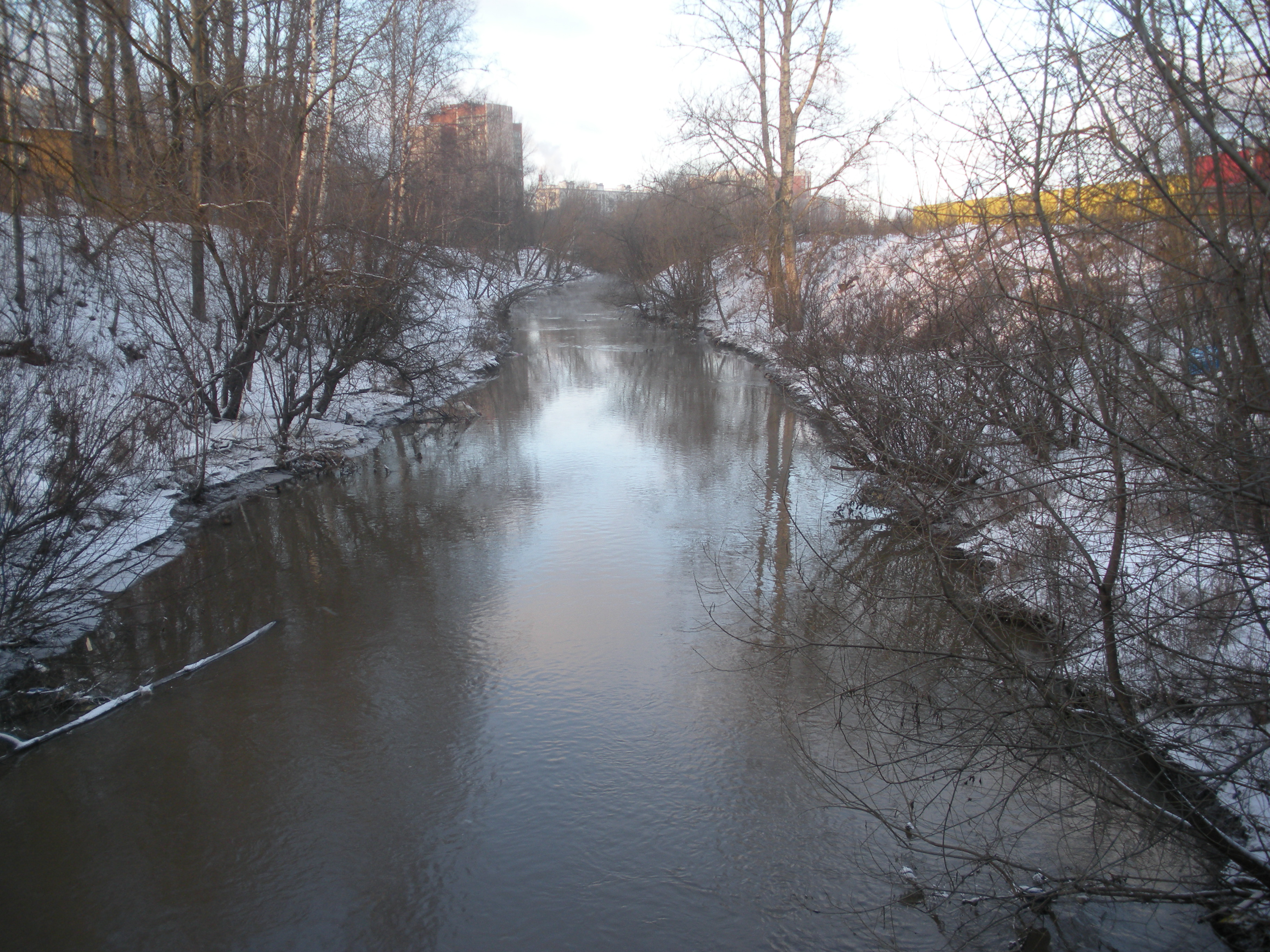

Location
- Country: Russia

Physical characteristics
- Mouth: Okhta
  - coordinates: 59°56′4″N 30°25′17″E
- Length: 18 km (11 mi)

Basin features
- Progression: Okhta→ Neva→ Gulf of Finland

The Okkervil (Russian: Оккервиль) is a river in Leningrad Oblast and the eastern part of the city of Saint Petersburg, Russia. It is the largest left tributary of the Okhta. It is 18 kilometres (11 mi) long and 1.5 to 25 metres (4.9 to 82.0 ft) wide.

The name Okkervil appeared in the 17th century, after the Swedish colonel who owned an estate on the bank. On some ancient maps of Saint Petersburg, the river is called Little Okhta (Russian: Малая Охта) as opposed to Big Okhta. Yet other times it is called Porkhovka (Russian: Порховка).

"Okkervil River" is the title of a well-known short story by Tatyana Tolstaya. The Austin, Texas-based indie rock band named Okkervil River takes its name from the story.

== Bridges ==
There are ten bridges across Okkervil River:

- Utkin Bridge
- Zanevsky Bridge
- Yablonovsky Bridge
- Rossijsky Bridge
- Kollontay Bridge
- Podvoisky Bridge
- Tovarischesky Bridge
- Dybenko Bridge
- Ice Bridge
- Klochkov Bridge
