= Overboard & Down =

- Cover Art by William Schaff

EP by Okkervil River
- Released: 2006
- Genre: Indie rock
- Length: 20:21
- Label: Low Transit Industries
- Producer: Okkervil River

Okkervil River chronology
Black Sheep Boy Appendix (2005)	Overboard & Down (2006)	The Stage Names (2007)

Professional ratings
Review scores
Source	Rating
Pitchfork Media	8.1/10

Overboard & Down is the fifth EP by indie band Okkervil River, released for their 2006 Australian tour. It is a mix of new material, an old song recorded live, and a Big Star cover ("O, Dana").

== Track listing ==
No.	Title	Length
1.	"The President's Dead"	2:42
2.	"The Room I'm Hiding In"	3:28
3.	"O, Dana"	3:01
4.	"Love to a Monster"	4:35
5.	"Westfall"	6:32
