= Black Sheep Boy Appendix =

- Cover Art by William Schaff

EP by Okkervil River
- Released: November 22, 2005
- Recorded: 2005; Brian Beattie's Wonder Chamber, Austin, Texas
- Genre: Indie rock
- Length: 35:00
- Label: Jagjaguwar
- Producer: Okkervil River

Okkervil River chronology
Black Sheep Boy (2005)	Black Sheep Boy Appendix (2005)	Overboard and Down (2006)

Professional ratings
Review scores
Source	Rating
AllMusic	3/5 stars
Austin Chronicle	3.5/5 stars
Entertainment Weekly	A−
Pitchfork	8.2/10
PopMatters	9/10
Rolling Stone	3.5/5 stars

Black Sheep Boy Appendix is the fourth EP by indie band Okkervil River, released on November 22, 2005. This mini-album is a continuation of their 2005 release, Black Sheep Boy and is a compilation of unfinished and reworked songs from that album. The disc also includes "Another Radio Song," a re-recorded and lyrically altered version of "For the Captain," a song featured on the band's 1999 debut release, Stars Too Small to Use. "Black Sheep Boy #4" is a re-recorded and lyrically altered version of "Disfigured Cowboy," originally released on the Comes With a Smile issue #11 CD sampler, and was played on an episode ("One Night") of Cold Case.

The definitive double-disc CD version contains a video for "No Key No Plan," directed by Will Sheff.

== Track listing ==
No.	Title	Length
1.	"Missing Children"	3:04
2.	"No Key, No Plan"	3:00
3.	"A Garden"	0:51
4.	"Black Sheep Boy #4"	5:23
5.	"The Next Four Months"	3:50
6.	"Another Radio Song"	4:59
7.	"A Forest"	1:24
8.	"Last Love Song for Now"	6:00

== Personnel ==
- Will Sheff - Vocals, Acoustic Guitar, Electric Guitar, Harmonica, Toy Piano, Toy Guitar, Pump Organ, Wurlitzer, Hammond M1
- Scott Brackett - Trumpet, Tambourine, Handclaps
- Brian Cassidy - Vocals, String Arrangement
- Howard Draper - Bass
- Chris Heinrich - Pedal Steel
- Jonathan Meiburg - Vocals, Pump Organ, Wurlitzer, 12-String Guitar
- Travis Nelsen - Drums, Tambourine, Shaker, Handclaps
- Patrick Pestorius - Bass, Handclaps
- Zachary Thomas - Bass, Handclaps
- Seth Warren - Electronics, Tambourine
- Amy Annelle - Vocals
- Elaine Barber - Harp
- Brian Beattie - Bowed Bass, Hammond Chord Organ
- Jennifer Bourianoff - Violin
- Jonathan Dexter - Cello
- Sara Driver - Viola
- Carrie Miller - Cello
- Michalis Koutsoupides - violin
- Alice Spencer - Mellotron
- Kimberly Burke - Handclaps
- Hot Tub Callahan - Handclaps
- Evan A. Castillo - Handclaps
- David Dalrymple - Handclaps
- Dan Franke - Handclaps
- Eric Katerman - Handclaps
- Renata Limon - Handclaps
- Linda Marie Martinez - Handclaps
- Amy Millangue - Handclaps
- Stacee Millangue - Handclaps
- Elizabeth Thomas - Handclaps
- Graham Thomas - Handclaps
- Heather L. Thompson - Handclaps
