= Storyhill =

American folk duo

- Also known as: Chris and Johnny
- Origin: Bozeman, Montana, United States
- Genres: Folk
- Years active: 1989–1996, 2003–2023
- Labels: Story Hills Records, Red House Records
- Spinoffs: Alva Star, The Hopefuls
- Members: Chris Cunningham; John Hermanson
- Website: storyhill.com

Storyhill is an American folk duo, composed of Chris Cunningham and John Hermanson. The acoustic songwriting duo formed in Bozeman, Montana in 1989 simply as Chris & Johnny. They did not adopt the name Storyhill until 1996. They started performing together in Montana and later Minnesota, creating a strong grass-roots following before surprisingly breaking up in 1997. After this, both Hermanson and Cunningham separately pursued solo and group musical endeavors. Hermanson performed with the band Alva Star and the band The Hopefuls, while Cunningham performed with Sixth Sense and singer-songwriter Justin Roth. Much to their listeners' enjoyment, the pair later happily reunited. After a number of self-produced albums they signed with Red House Records to produce the album Storyhill (2007), which received favorable reviews. The album was voted Best Acoustic Ensemble CD of the year by the Indie Acoustic Music Project. The group is a winner of the 2007 Kerrville New Folk Competition.

A documentary film Storyhill: Parallel Lives, directed by Andrew Zilch, was released in 2008 and is available on DVD.

== Discography ==
=== Studio albums ===
- Chris and Johnny – (as Chris and Johnny, 1989)
- Shapeshifting – (as Chris and Johnny, 1991)
- Different Waters – (as Chris and Johnny, 1992)
- Miles and Means – (as Chris and Johnny, 1994)
- Clearing – (as Chris Cunningham and Johnny Hermanson, 1995)
- This Side of Lost – (1996)
- Dovetail – (2002)
- Duotones: A Tribute to Duos of the '70s – (2005)
- Storyhill – (Red House Records, 2007)
- Shade of the Trees – (Red House Records, 2010)
- Where to Begin – (2019)
- Bethlehem – (2020)

=== Live albums ===
- Live at the Grand – (Chris and Johnny, 1993)
- Storyhill Live – (1997)
- Echoes: The Final Show – (1997)
- Reunion – (2001)

=== EPs ===
- Collage EP – (promotional sampler, 1996)
