= True Love Cast Out All Evil =

2010 album by Roky Erickson

Studio album by Roky Erickson feat. Okkervil River
- Released: 20 April 2010
- Recorded: Unknown
- Genre: Indie rock
- Length: 44:40
- Label: ANTI-
- Producer: Will Sheff

Roky Erickson chronology
Halloween (Live) (2008)	True Love Cast Out All Evil (2010)

True Love Cast Out All Evil is a 2010 album by Roky Erickson, his first album of new material in 14 years. Produced by Okkervil River's Will Sheff, the album also features the members of Okkervil River on most songs as Erickson's backing band. The album also includes field recordings of songs from Erickson's time in a Texas insane asylum. It was released by ANTI- in America and by Chemikal Underground in Europe.

== Critical reception ==
Professional ratings
Aggregate scores
Source	Rating
Metacritic	82/100
Review scores
Source	Rating
AllMusic	4.5/5 stars
American Songwriter	4.5/5 stars
The A.V. Club	A−
Chicago Tribune	3.5/4 stars
Drowned in Sound	9/10
The Guardian	3/5 stars
NME	9/10
Pitchfork	7.4/10
PopMatters	9/10
Record Collector	5/5 stars

The album was well received by critics: according to Metacritic, the album has received an average review score of 82/100, based on 26 reviews, indicating "universal acclaim". PopMatters called the album "a staggeringly life-affirming work that sticks to your soul long after the final notes ring out." A.V. Club reviewer Christopher Bahn, noting that Erickson's difficult personal life had made new recordings from him seem unlikely, said that "it's a triumph merely that this album exists, but True Love's musical richness goes beyond what could reasonably have been expected from even a resurgent Roky." AllMusic's Mark Deming called the album "more than just a comeback, it's the best and most deeply moving album of [Erickson's] solo career."

== Track listing ==
All tracks composed by Roky Erickson

1. "Devotional Number One" – 2:17
2. "Ain't Blues Too Sad" – 1:24
3. "Goodbye Sweet Dreams" – 4:26
4. "Be and Bring Me Home" – 5:36
5. "Bring Back the Past" – 2:02
6. "Please, Judge" – 4:26
7. "John Lawman" – 3:57
8. "True Love Cast Out All Evil" – 4:30
9. "Forever" – 3:58
10. "Think of As One" – 5:21
11. "Birds'd Crash" – 3:59
12. "God Is Everywhere" – 2:41

== Musicians ==
=== Roky Erickson & Okkervil River ===
- Roky Erickson – vocals, acoustic guitar (1, 7, 12), electric guitar (6)
- Scott Brackett – Hammond organ, trumpet, percussion
- Brian Cassidy – electric guitar (3, 5), piano (7), pedal steel (8), string quartet arrangements
- Lauren Gurgiolo – electric guitar
- Jonathan Meiburg – piano (3), electric guitar (7)
- Will Sheff – vocals, acoustic guitar, mellotron, piano (1, 4, 5, 6, 8), electric guitar (1, 3, 9), Hammond organ (1, 2, 8), drums (10), jug
- Justin Sherburn – piano, pump organ, Wurlitzer, Rhodes, horn arrangements
- Travis Nelsen – drums and percussion
- Patrick Pestorius – bass

=== Guests ===
- Caitlin Bailey – cello
- Gilbert Elorreaga – trumpet (4, 7, 10)
- José Galeano – congas, guira
- Mark Gonzalez – trombone
- Josh Levy – baritone saxophone
- Annalise Ohse – violin
- Sarah Pizzichemi – violin
- Stuart Sullivan – chair
- Tara Szczygielski – electric and acoustic violins (1, 3, 6, 8)
- Will Thothong – viola
- Beth Wawerna – vocals (8, 9)
- Unknown Inmate – additional acoustic guitar (1, 10)
