= The Hopefuls =

2000s indie-pop band from Minneapolis

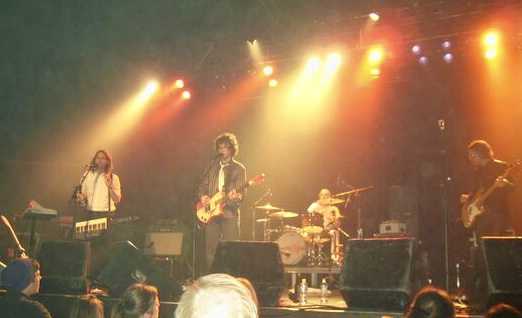
- John Hermanson, Darren Jackson, Eric Fawcett, and Heath Henjum playing First Avenue in June 2009

Background information
- Also known as: Olympic Hopefuls, Camaro
- Origin: Minneapolis, Minnesota
- Genres: indie-pop, power pop
- Years active: 2004-2010
- Labels: 2024 Records; Draw Fire Records
- Spinoffs: Tapes 'n Tapes, Vicious Vicious
- Spinoff of: Alva Star, Kid Dakota, Storyhill, Spymob
- Past members: Darren Jackson; Heath Henjum; John Hermanson; Eric Fawcett; Erik Appelwick; Matt O'Laughlin

The Hopefuls, formerly known as The Olympic Hopefuls, were an indie-pop group from Minneapolis, Minnesota. The Hopefuls won both the Artist of the Year and Best Pop Artist awards at the 2005 Minnesota Music Awards.

== Musical style ==
The Hopefuls' music is peppy, light, and often deliberately corny. They defined their music as "fun music for fun times" and kept their songs upbeat and fast-paced. They often used xylophone fills, synthesizers, and hand claps to, as their webpage said, "keep heads bopping and asses shaking."

On their first album, Jackson and Appelwick switched off writing and singing songs; Appelwick sang the odd-numbered songs and Jackson sang the even-numbered. Their songs were typically about romance and the problems associated with it.

== History ==
Darren Jackson and Erik Appelwick, (of Minnesota bands Kid Dakota and Vicious Vicious, respectively) began recording and performing under the name of Camaro in the early 2000s. As their popularity on the Minneapolis music scene increased, they changed their names to The Olympic Hopefuls and were picked up by 2024 records, a local independent label. They released their debut album, The Fuses Refuse to Burn in 2004.

In 2005 the band was forced to shorten its name to The Hopefuls after being informed that the United States Olympic Committee owned the trademark to the word "Olympic."

The song "Let's Go!" was featured on the second seasons of both The O.C. and Laguna Beach: The Real Orange County.

The song "Drain the Sea" was featured on the first disc of the "For New Orleans" charity cd set produced by "Sugarfoot Music".

In April 2006, Appelwick left The Hopefuls to play bass for Tapes 'n Tapes.

On December 20, 2008, The Hopefuls released their second album Now Playing at the One-Seat Theatre on local independent label Draw Fire Records. Due to their busy schedules, all four band members were never present in the recording studio at the same time during the album's recording. The band's last show was played the following year.

== Band members ==
- Darren Jackson: guitar and vocals.
- Heath Henjum: bass.
- John Hermanson: keyboards, vocals.
- Eric Fawcett: drums.
- Erik Appelwick: guitar and vocals (until 2006).
- Matt O'Laughlin: drums (until 2005).

== Discography ==
The Fuses Refuse to Burn Label: 2024 Records Released: 2004: 1. "Imaginary" (Applewick); 2. "Holiday" (Jackson); 3. "Shy" (Applewick); 4. "Drain the Sea" (Jackson); 5. "Motobike" (Applewick) / 6. "Whisper" (Jackson); 7. "Let's Go!" (Applewick/Jackson); 8. "Trust Fund" (Jackson); 9. "Pretty Bigmouth" (Applewick); 10. "Stoned Again" (Jackson)

Now Playing at the One-Seat Theatre Label: Draw Fire Records Released: Dec. 20, 2008: 1. "Edge of Medicine" (Jackson); 2. "Idaho" (Jackson); 3. "Virgin Wood" (Jackson); 4. "Stacey" (Hermanson/Jackson); 5. "Miss You" (Jackson); 6. "One-Seat Theatre" (Jackson) / 7. "Only Dreaming" (Hermanson); 8. "Red Stain" (Jackson); 9. "What She Wants" (Jackson); 10. "Hold Your Own" (Hermanson/Appelwick); 11. "Love Without a Future (The Director's Cut)" (Jackson)

== Media ==
In 2018, Paul V. Allan released The Hopefuls: Chasing a Rock 'n' Roll Dream in the Minnesota Music Scene, a book about The Hopefuls and many other related bands (Spymob, Storyhill, Kid Dakota, Tapes 'n Tapes, Vicious Vicious, etc.)
