= Sleep and Wake-Up Songs =

- Cover Art by William Schaff

EP by Okkervil River
- Released: November 2, 2004
- Recorded: 2004
- Genre: Indie rock
- Length: 21:58
- Label: Jagjaguwar
- Producer: Okkervil River

Okkervil River chronology
Down the River of Golden Dreams (2003)	Sleep and Wake-Up Songs (2004)	Black Sheep Boy (2005)

Professional ratings
Review scores
Source	Rating
AllMusic	3/5 stars
Pitchfork	7.7/10
PopMatters	8/10

Sleep and Wake-Up Songs is the third EP by Okkervil River, released on November 2, 2004. This interim release was in anticipation of their subsequent full-length album, Black Sheep Boy.

== Track listing ==
No.	Title	Length
1.	"A Favor"	5:59
2.	"You're Untied Again"	3:05
3.	"And I Have Seen the World of Dreams"	4:20
4.	"Just Give Me Time"	4:08
5.	"No Hidden Track"	4:26
