= So Pretty (album) =

Studio album by Kid Dakota
- Released: November 5, 2002
- Genre: Indie rock
- Label: Chairkickers' Union Music

Kid Dakota chronology
So Pretty (2002)	The West Is the Future (2004)

Professional ratings
Review scores
Source	Rating
Dusted Magazine	Favourable

So Pretty is an album by Kid Dakota.

== Track listing ==
All music is composed by Darren Jackson except where noted.

No.	Title	Length
1.	"Crossin' Fingers"	4:23
2.	"Smokestack"	4:53
3.	"Bathroom"	5:19
4.	"So Pretty"	5:05
5.	"Summer Cold" (Written by Brian Roessler and Darren Jackson)	4:59
6.	"Pairin' Off"	1:44
7.	"Coalminer"	6:21
8.	"The Overcoat"	9:55
Total length:		42:39
