= Listen to the Crows as They Take Flight =

Listen To The Crows As They Take Flight

Studio album by Kid Dakota
- Released: October 11, 2011
- Recorded: Minneapolis, United States
- Genre: Indie rock
- Length: 43:36
- Label: Graveface Records

Kid Dakota chronology
A Winners Shadow (2008)	Listen To The Crows As They Take Flight (2011)

Listen To The Crows As They Take Flight is the fourth album by Kid Dakota. It was released on October 11, 2011, by Graveface Records.

== Track listing ==
No.	Title	Length
1.	"Dawn Did Us Part"	4:24
2.	"Interlude"	1:01
3.	"Jay's a Wreck"	4:30
4.	"Phantom Pain"	4:33
5.	"Dreaming of the City"	5:57
6.	"War and Pieces"	4:10
7.	"The Winter Without You"	4:25
8.	"Extra Ordinary"	4:27
9.	"Torn in Two"	5:43
10.	"Fiber Optic Failure"	4:32

== Personnel ==
Kid Dakota

- Darren Jackson - lead vocals, guitar

Production

- Additional contributions from Eliza Blue, Dosh, and Haley Bonar.
