= Brown Bird =

American music group (2003–2014)

- MorganEve Swain and David Lamb (2011)

Background information
- Origin: Portland, Maine; Providence, Rhode Island
- Genres: Americana; gothic country; contemporary folk; indie folk
- Years active: 2003–2015
- Label: Peapod Recordings
- Past members: David Lamb; MorganEve Swain; Jerusha Robinson; Jeremy Robinson; Mike Samos
- Website: www.brownbird.net

Brown Bird was an American music group, originally formed in 2003 in Seattle, Washington as a solo project by David Lamb. Adding and changing its membership over time, the band's final incarnation was the duo of Lamb and his wife MorganEve Swain. The band ceased in 2014 following Lamb's death from leukemia.

== History ==
Lamb formed Brown Bird in 2003 in Seattle, Washington but moved soon thereafter to Portland, Maine. The line-up soon included Jerusha Robinson on cello and her husband Jeremy Robinson on multiple instruments. The Robinsons left the group in 2009, leaving Lamb, MorganEve Swain on fiddle, and Mike Samos on lap steel guitar and dobro in the line-up.

In 2010, with the departure of Samos, the band became a duo.

Brown Bird played the Newport Folk Festival for the first time in 2011 and were based in Providence, Rhode Island at the time. They have toured with The Devil Makes Three.

Brown Bird went on hiatus in early 2013 after David Lamb was diagnosed with leukemia. Lamb died from the disease on April 5, 2014.

In April 2015 Brown Bird released their final album, Axis Mundi, produced by MorganEve Swain. Most of Axis Mundi was written and demoed while David was recuperating at home from his bone marrow transplant. It peaked at #12 on the Billboard Heatseeker Chart. MorganEve continues to record and release music, now under the name The Huntress and the Holder of Hands.

In 2021, Brown Bird's "Bilgewater" was featured as the theme song of the Syfy television series Resident Alien.

== Musical style ==
Brown Bird is influenced by American folk music, Gypsy music, and bluegrass. The band crosses many genres and cites their inspiration as the music they love including Middle-Eastern psych-rock from the ‘60s and ‘70s, intricate post-metal, and the music of the Balkan gypsies. According to Aimsel Ponti of the Portland Press Herald "[t]heir sound is one that lives on the darker side of American folk, ensconced in Eastern European roots music."

== Works ==
- Brown Bird Self Titled (2005)
- Tautology (2007)
- Such Unrest (Spring 2007)
- Bottom of the Sea (2008)
- The Devil Dancing (2009)
- The Sound of Ghosts (EP, March 2011)
- Salt for Salt (October 2011)
- Fits of Reason (April 2013)
- The Teeth of Sea and Beasts - The Poetry of Brown Bird (Book, April 2014)
- The Brown Bird Christmas Album (November 2014)
- Axis Mundi (April 2015)
