= The West Is the Future =

Studio album by Kid Dakota
- Released: October 5, 2004
- Genre: Indie rock
- Label: Chairkickers' Union Music

Kid Dakota chronology
| So Pretty (2002) | The West Is the Future (2004) | A Winner's Shadow (2008) |

Professional ratings
Review scores
| Source | Rating |
|---|---|
| Allmusic | 3/5 stars |
| Pitchfork | (7.2/10) |

The West Is the Future is a 2004 album by Kid Dakota.

== Track listing ==
1. "Pilgrim" (Jackson) – 3:44
2. "Homesteader" (Jackson) – 7:30
3. "Pine Ridge" (Jackson) – 4:24
4. "Ivan" (Jackson) – 3:36
5. "Ten Thousand Lakes" (Jackson) (download) – 5:06
6. "Starlight Motel" (Jackson) – 8:02
7. "Winterkill" (Brain, Jackson) – 6:05
8. "2001" (Jackson) – 9:48
9. "Atomic Pilgrim" (Jackson) – 3:23
