= So Pretty (song) =

Song composed by Leonard Bernstein

"So Pretty" is a 1968 anti-war song (referring to the Vietnam War) by Leonard Bernstein to lyrics by Betty Comden and Adolph Green, contributed to a Broadway for Peace fundraiser on January 21, 1968, at Lincoln Center's Philharmonic Hall. The song was performed by Barbra Streisand dressed in a gingham smock and fisherman's hat and accompanied by the composer at the piano.

== Recordings ==
- Deborah Voigt on All My Heart - Deborah Voigt Sings American Songs Angel Records 2005
- David Daniels on A Quiet Thing - Songs For Voice And Guitar Craig Ogden Virgin Classics 2003
