= For Real (Okkervil River song) =

"For Real (There's Nothing Quite Like the Blinding Light)"

Single by Okkervil River
- A-side: "For Real (There's Nothing Quite Like the Blinding Light)"
- B-side: "The Next Four Months"/"For the Enemy"
- Released: 2005
- Genre: Indie rock
- Length: 18:01
- Songwriter(s): Will Sheff
- Producer(s): Okkervil River

Okkervil River singles chronology
"Split single with South San Gabriel" (2002)	"For Real (There's Nothing Quite Like the Blinding Light)" (2005)	"The President's Dead" (2006)

"For Real (There's Nothing Quite Like the Blinding Light)" is a 2005 single by indie band Okkervil River, released prior to the album Black Sheep Boy. The single features an extended version of "For Real", with "The Next Four Months" and "For the Enemy" as B-sides. "The Next Four Months" is an outtake from Black Sheep Boy, and "For the Enemy" is a live recording, performed while the band members were intoxicated.

== Track listing ==
1. "For Real" – 5:32
2. "The Next Four Months" – 3:31
3. "For the Enemy (Live)" – 8:55
