= Down the River of Golden Dreams =

Studio album by Okkervil River
- Released: September 2, 2003
- Recorded: 2003
- Studios: Tiny Telephone, OTR, and 15th Street, San Francisco, California
- Genres: Indie rock, baroque pop
- Length: 45:58
- Label: Jagjaguwar
- Producer: Okkervil River

Okkervil River chronology
Don't Fall in Love with Everyone You See (2002)	Down the River of Golden Dreams (2003)	Sleep and Wake-Up Songs (2004)

Professional ratings
Review scores
Source	Rating
AllMusic	4/5 stars
Entertainment Weekly	A−
Pitchfork	7.5/10
Sputnikmusic	5/5 stars

Down the River of Golden Dreams is the second full-length studio album by Okkervil River, released on September 2, 2003. William Schaff continued to create artwork for Okkervil River with this release. The record label Jagjaguwar released the album on CD and vinyl under the catalog number JAG54.

== Track listing ==
No.	Title	Length
1.	"Down the River of Golden Dreams"	1:15
2.	"It Ends with a Fall"	3:55
3.	"For the Enemy"	6:09
4.	"Blanket and Crib"	2:51
5.	"The War Criminal Rises and Speaks"	5:11
6.	"The Velocity of Saul at the Time of His Conversion"	4:25
7.	"Dead Faces"	2:36
8.	"Maine Island Lovers"	4:51
9.	"Song About a Star"	3:30
10.	"Yellow"	6:14
11.	"Seas Too Far to Reach"	5:01

== Personnel ==
Okkervil River

- Will Sheff - Vocals, guitar, whirlies
- Jonathan Meiburg - Vocals, piano, Hammond organ, Wurlizter, Rhodes, Mellotron, banjo, tambourine
- Zachary Thomas - Vocals, electric bass, mandolin
- Seth Warren - Vocals, drums, whirlies
- Michi Aceret - Viola
- Geoffrey Hershberger - Cello
- Thomas Heyman - Pedal steel guitar
- Alan Molina - Violin
- John Vanderslice - Bells

The First National Brass

- Katie Curran - Trombone
- Dan Eastwood - Trumpet
- Graham Taylor - Trumpet

Technical personnel

- Okkervil River - Producer
- Scott Solter - Recording
- Billy Stull - Mastering
- Cover art - William Schaff
- Darius Van Arman - Layout and design
