= Okkervil River =

American rock band

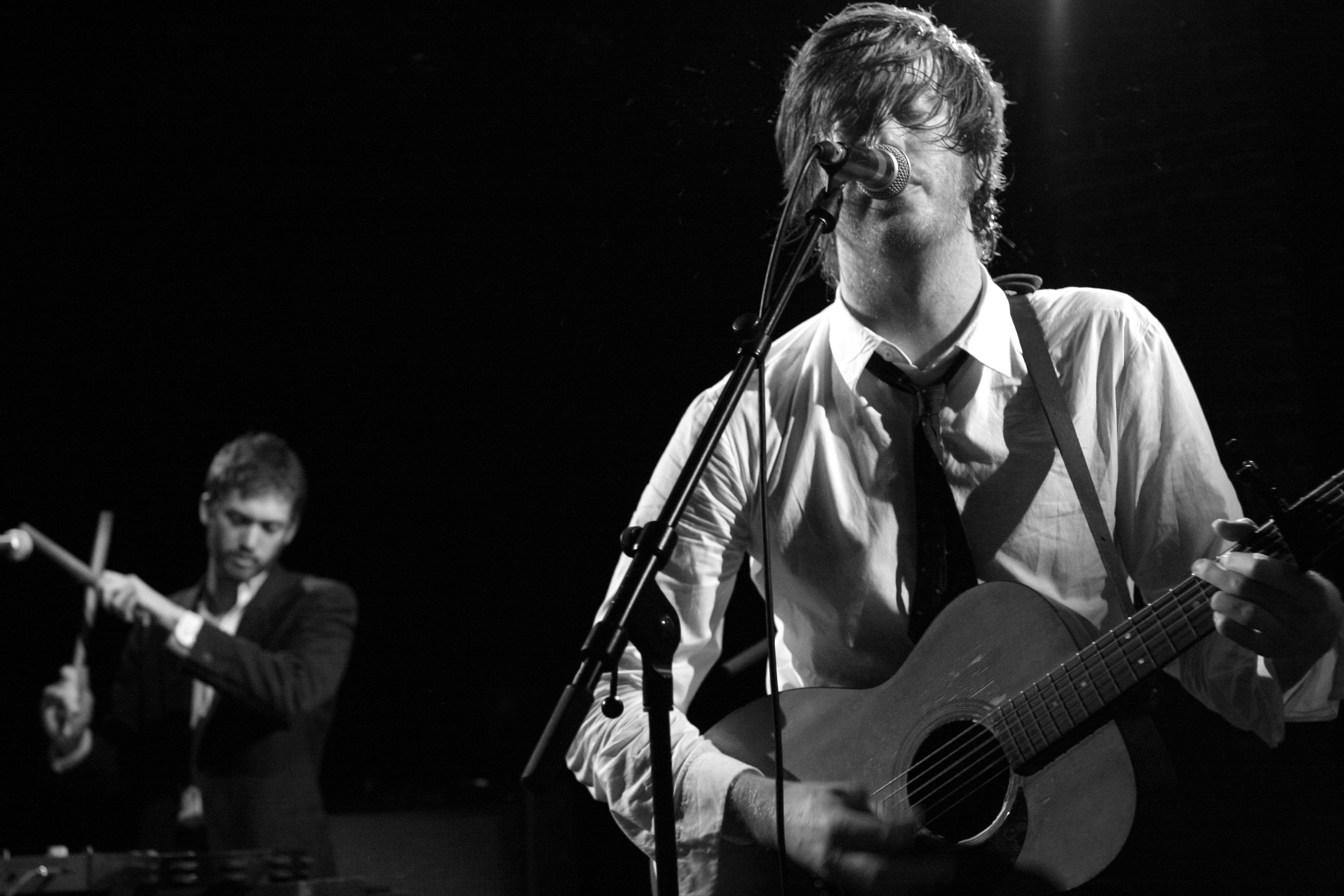
- Okkervil River in 2008

Background information
- Origin: Austin, Texas, U.S.
- Genres: Indie rock; folk rock; alternative rock
- Years active: 1998–present
- Labels: Jagjaguwar, Jound, Virgin, EMI, ATO, MapleMusic (Canada), Low Transit Industries
- Spinoffs: Shearwater
- Members: Will Sheff; Cully Symington; Will Graefe; Benjamin Lazar Davis; Sarah Pedinotti
- Past members: Travis Nelsen; Chris Heinrich; Scott Brackett; Howard Draper; Jonathan Meiburg; Mark Pedini; Zach Thomas; Seth Warren; Brian Cassidy; Patrick Pestorius; Justin Sherburn; Lauren Gurgiolo; Michael St.Clair
- Website: okkervilriver.com

Okkervil River is an American rock band led by singer-songwriter Will Sheff. Formed in Austin, Texas, in 1998, the band takes its name from a short story by Russian author Tatyana Tolstaya set on the river Okkervil in Saint Petersburg. They began as a trio made up of Sheff and friends he had met in his native state of New Hampshire but, over time, have gone through many lineups.

Okkervil River self-released their first album, Stars Too Small to Use, which led them to the South by Southwest music festival. After recording their first album in a garage, they signed with Jagjaguwar. They continued by releasing four more albums, including the critically lauded concept album Black Sheep Boy.

After a period of touring for Black Sheep Boy, Okkervil River followed up with The Stage Names. The album sold 10,000 in its opening week in the United States. The group released a free covers album, Golden Opportunities Mixtape from their live performances.

The band has garnered positive critical reception. They have appeared on the talk show Late Night with Conan O'Brien and have performed with acts such as The Decemberists, The New Pornographers, The National, and Lou Reed.

Okkervil River released the album The Stand Ins in 2008. They promoted the release with a series of cover songs from the album on YouTube by people they've met as a band. Their 2010 collaboration as a backing band with psychedelic rocker Roky Erickson yielded True Love Cast Out All Evil. In 2011, Okkervil River released their sixth full-length album, I Am Very Far, which peaked at No. 32 on the Billboard 200. The band released their seventh album, The Silver Gymnasium, in 2013. The album peaked at No. 66 on the Billboard 200. This was followed by the album, Away, which was released in 2016 on ATO Records. Their ninth album, In the Rainbow Rain, was released by ATO in 2018.

== History ==
=== Formation ===
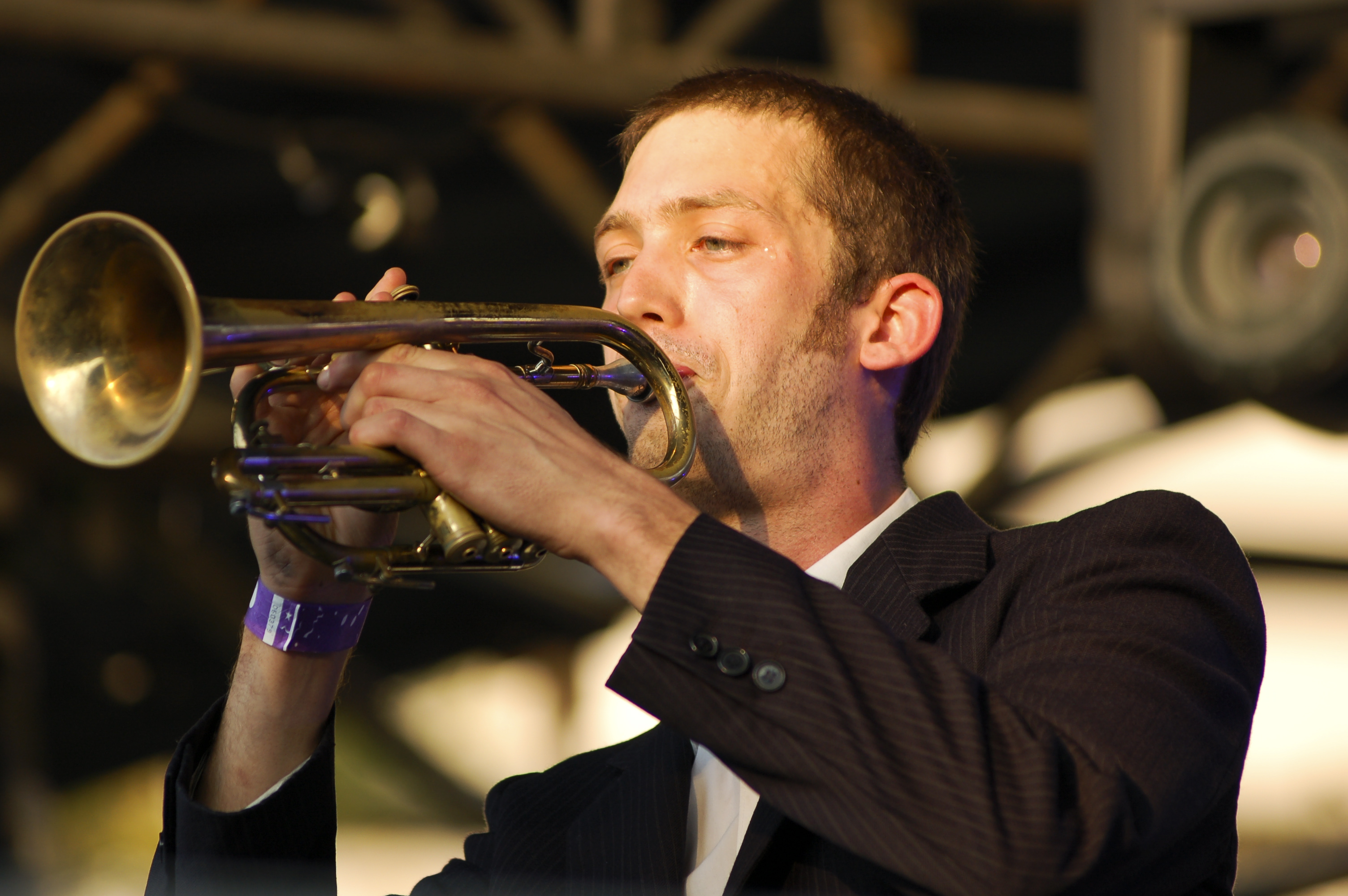
Scott Brackett playing trumpet at the 2007 Fun Fun Fest in Austin, Texas

Okkervil River's founding members became friends at Kimball Union Academy in Meriden, New Hampshire, and after parting ways for college moved to Austin, Texas to live together and start a band. The band consisted of singer-songwriter Will Sheff, Zach Thomas on bass and mandolin, and Seth Warren on drums. Their first gig was at Steamboat in Austin on January 11, 1999.

=== Bedroom EP and Stars Too Small to Use ===
In 1998, the group self-released their first disc, Bedroom EP. Over the course of two weekends in the summer of 1999, they recorded a seven-song self-released album titled Stars Too Small to Use, with recording engineer Jeff Hoskins.

They met Jonathan Meiburg at a gig with his band Whu Gnu at the Waterloo Brewing Company on December 3, 1999. Meiburg subsequently joined the band on accordion and later on pianos and organs.

On the strength of Stars Too Small to Use, Okkervil River was admitted into the 2000 SXSW music festival. Their first major press was a SXSW feature article in the Austin Chronicle on March 3, 2000.

=== Don't Fall in Love with Everyone You See and Down the River of Golden Dreams ===
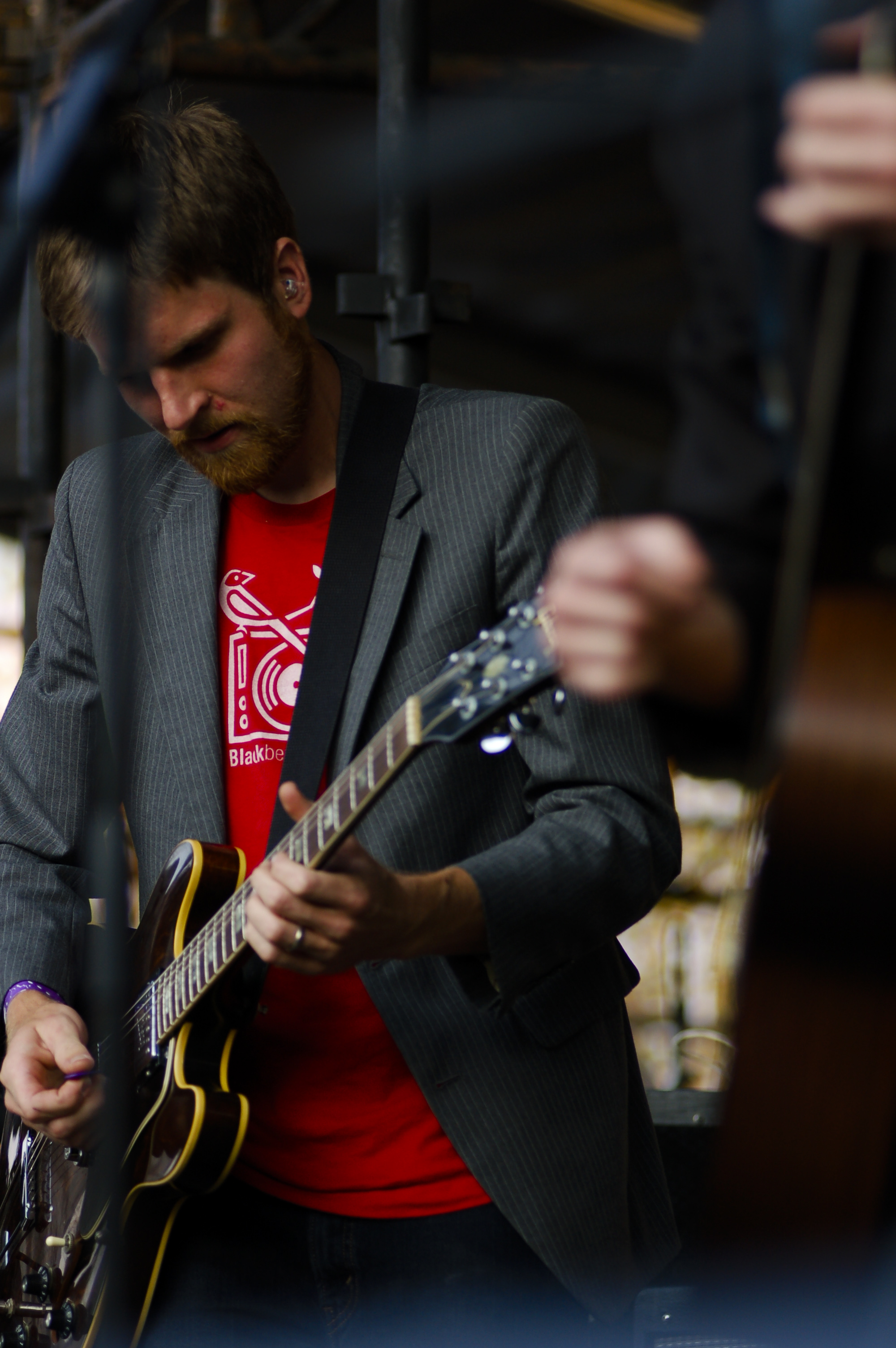
Okkervil guitarist Brian Cassidy at Fun Fun Fun fest in 2007

The band met recording engineer and producer Brian Beattie at their SXSW showcase on March 18, 2000, and soon agreed to make a record together. They spent much of the rest of that year working on Don't Fall in Love with Everyone You See. Warren moved to Berkeley, California in December and was replaced on drums by Mark Pedini.

By the time of that year's SXSW festival, Okkervil River had received interest in their new record from the Bloomington, Indiana-based record label Jagjaguwar. The record was released on Jagjaguwar on January 22, 2002.

One year later the band traveled to San Francisco and reunited with Warren to record their third album at Tiny Telephone Studios with engineer Scott Solter at the console. Jagjaguwar released Down the River of Golden Dreams on September 2, 2003.

In 2003, Pedini left the band to pursue his graphic design work, leaving Okkervil River without a drummer for that year's SXSW. They invited Travis Nelsen, fresh off a tour filling in on drums for sister labelmates Secretly Canadian's Swearing at Motorists, to perform with them. He soon became the band's full-time drummer. The next year, during a long bout of touring, the band added keyboardist and lap-steel player Howard Draper as a fifth member.

=== Black Sheep Boy, The Stage Names and The Stand Ins ===
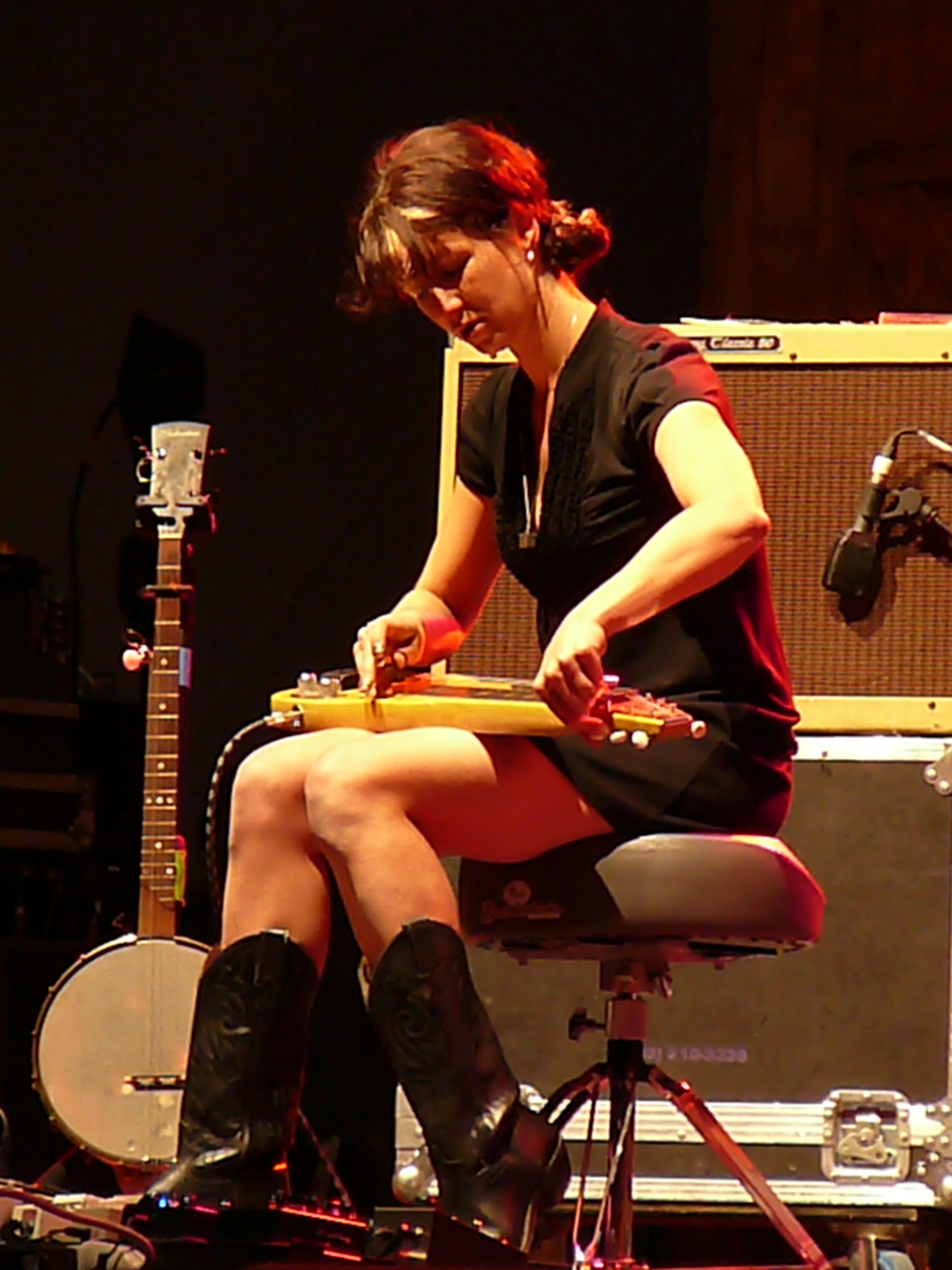
Lauren Gurgiolo

In August 2004, the band began recording with Beattie again, finally putting the finishing touches on their third full-length album, Black Sheep Boy in November. It was released on April 5, 2005. As a result of the album's critical success, Okkervil River followed up with an EP entitled Black Sheep Boy Appendix on November 22, 2005. This was the first recording with Draper, horn and keyboardist Scott Brackett, guitarist Brian Cassidy, and touring bassist Pat Pestorius, who eventually replaced Zach Thomas in the band. The band signed to Virgin/EMI in Europe and the label re-released Black Sheep Boy and its follow-up Black Sheep Boy Appendix as a double disc on April 28, 2006. Jagjaguwar eventually followed suit, releasing the Definitive Edition with extra songs and videos.

The Stage Names, their fourth full-length studio album (produced again by Beattie), was released on August 7, 2007. The disc features the line-up that toured extensively on Black Sheep Boy and the Black Sheep Boy Appendix, with Cassidy replacing Draper who joined Shearwater. The album was met with critical acclaim and debuted at number 62 on the Billboard 200 with 10,000 copies sold.

Okkervil River released their fifth album The Stand Ins on September 9, 2008. In its first week, the album charted at No. 42 with 11,000 copies sold, according to the Billboard 200. On December 12, 2007, the band freely released a nine-song mixtape entitled Golden Opportunities Mixtape via their website. These recordings, along with the upcoming appendix, are the first to feature contributions from new touring keyboardist, Justin Sherburn, who joined the band in November 2007.

In 2008 guitarist Brian Cassidy stepped down from the band as a full-time touring member and was temporarily replaced by Charles Bissell of The Wrens for their spring and summer tours. Bissell was later replaced by Lauren Gurgiolo, singer and songwriter of the Austin, Texas band The Dialtones. After performing on the Late Show with David Letterman in early 2009, the "Pop Lie" single was released backed with the b-sides "Millionaire" and "Pop Lie (One Man Band Version)".

=== I Am Very Far & The Silver Gymnasium ===
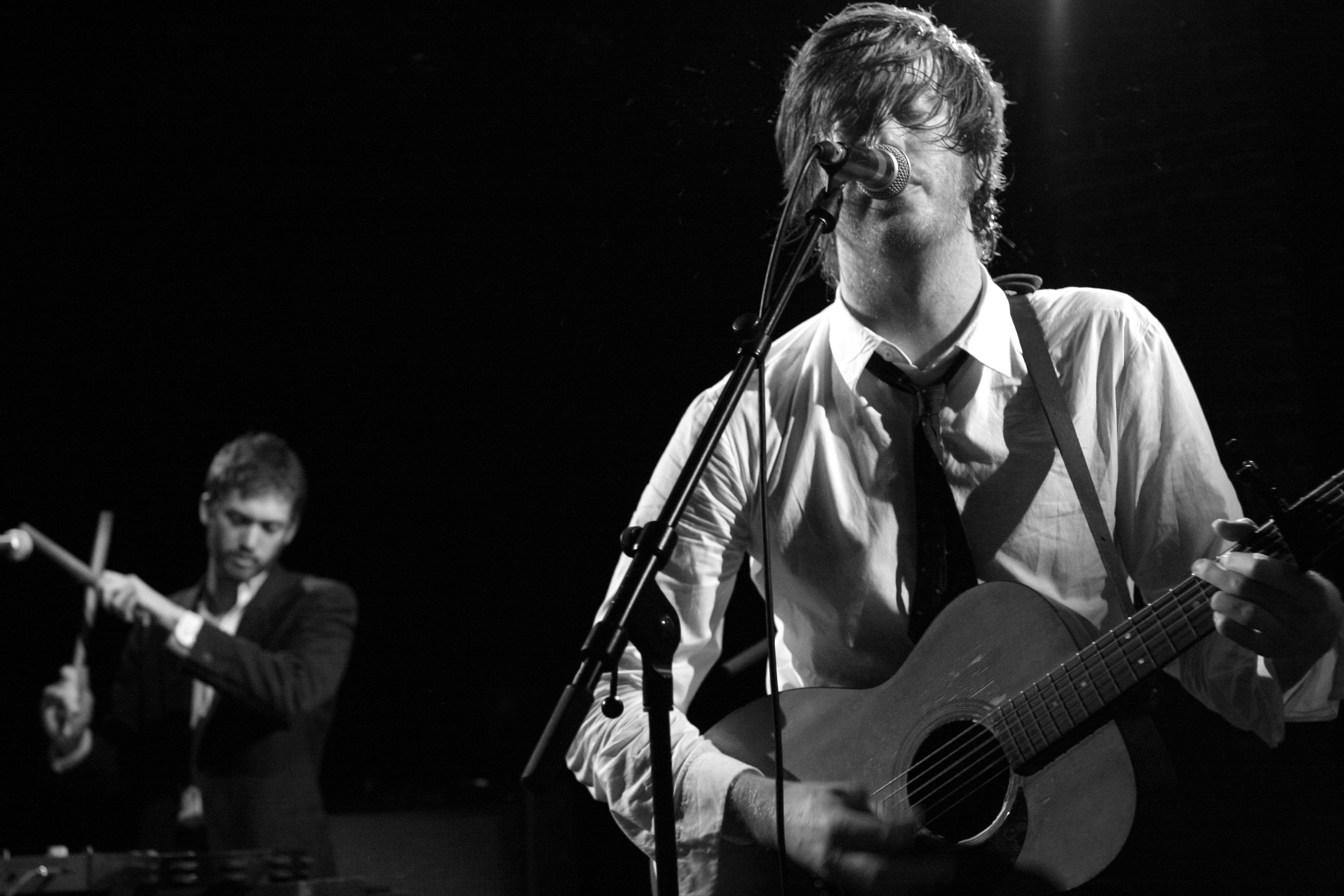
Will Sheff, lead singer and songwriter (2008)

Okkervil River's sixth album, I Am Very Far, was released on May 10, 2011. To promote the album, the band went on tour in 2011 with Titus Andronicus, Julianna Barwick, Future Islands and NewVillager. In September 2013 Okkervil River released their seventh album, The Silver Gymnasium, the content of which is inspired by Sheff's childhood and hometown.

=== Away ===
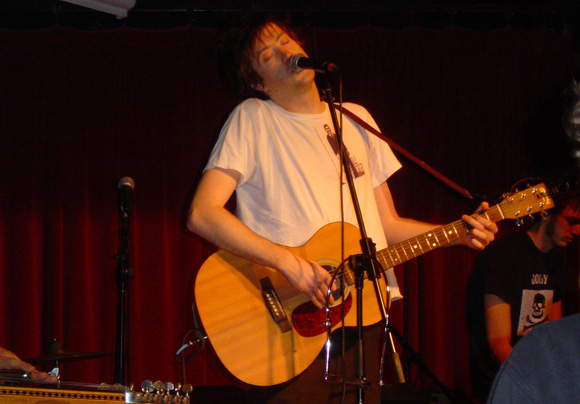
Will Sheff (Okkervil river)

Away, the band's eighth album, was released on September 9, 2016. The album features a new backing band and sonic direction, including contributions from Marissa Nadler, Jonathan Meiburg and members of the classical group yMusic. The content of the album is largely based on Will Sheff's life during the 2013–2015 period after the release of The Silver Gymnasium, during which many members of the band left and his grandfather died.

=== In the Rainbow Rain ===
In the Rainbow Rain was released on April 27, 2018, and marks the ninth album for the band. Will Sheff produced the album while Shawn Everett (Perfume Genius, Alabama Shakes, The War on Drugs) assumed mixing responsibilities. The writing process incorporated Sheff's songwriting craftsmanship with an interplay of his new bandmates, Benjamin Lazar Davis (bass), Will Graefe (guitar), Lip Talk (Sarah K. Pedinotti) (keys) and Cully Symington (percussion) – the same iteration of Okkervil River that joined Sheff on the Away tour.

Sheff and the band started work on the new album shortly after the end of that tour – and the presidential election. "If December 2016 was good for anything, it was good for writing songs", he said. Sheff took a different approach to the album, sometimes co-writing with his new band, and occasionally attending local Quaker meetings.

== Other projects ==
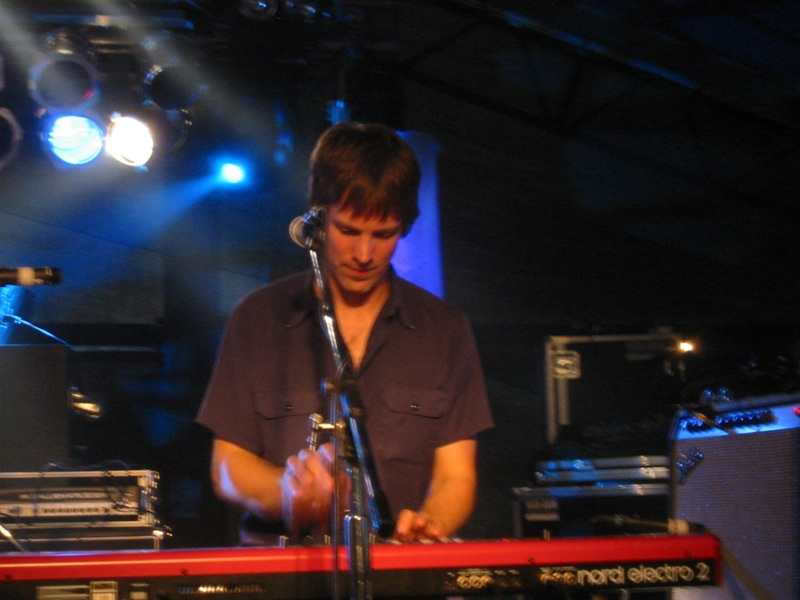
Jonathan Meiburg, former Okkervil River member, at a festival in 2006

In 2001, Meiburg and Sheff founded a second band known as Shearwater. Originally an outlet for Meiburg songs and some Sheff songs that didn't fit the Okkervil mold, Shearwater has gradually evolved into a full-fledged band. The band's 2006 release, Palo Santo (sans Sheff's vocals, but including his musical input), has seen Meiburg receive great critical acclaim. The groups still share many fans, and, while on tour together in 2004, they released a limited edition split-CD entitled Sham Wedding/Hoax Funeral. In 2008, Meiburg left Okkervil River to focus exclusively on Shearwater.

On April 20, 2010, former 13th Floor Elevators singer-guitarist Roky Erickson released the album True Love Cast Out All Evil, produced by Will Sheff and backed by Okkervil River.

Okkervil River's "Unless It’s Kicks" was featured in the 2013 film A Birder's Guide to Everything.

Okkervil River also performed "Candle on the Water" for the 2016 remake of "Pete's Dragon".

== Discography ==
=== Albums ===
List of studio albums, with selected chart positions
Title	Album details	Peak chart positions										Sales
Title	Album details	US	US Indie	US Rock	BEL	FRA	NOR	SCO	SWE	UK	UK Indie	Sales
Don't Fall in Love with Everyone You See	Released: January 22, 2002; Label: Jagjaguwar	—	—	—	—	—	—	—	—	—	—	
Down the River of Golden Dreams	Released: September 2, 2003; Label: Jagjaguwar	—	—	—	—	—	—	—	—	—	—	
Black Sheep Boy	Released: April 5, 2005; Label: Jagjaguwar	—	—	—	—	—	—	—	—	—	—	
The Stage Names	Released: August 7, 2007; Label: Jagjaguwar	62	5	17	—	179	—	—	—	—	—	
The Stand Ins	Released: September 9, 2008; Label: Jagjaguwar	42	5	14	—	—	23	—	57	—	—	
I Am Very Far	Released: May 10, 2011; Label: Jagjaguwar	32	5	10	—	—	23	64	51	66	10	
The Silver Gymnasium	Released: September 3, 2013; Label: ATO Records	66	—	20	—	—	—	—	—	—	—	US: 22,000
Away	Released: September 9, 2016; Label: ATO Records	— (Note: Away did not enter the US Billboard 200, but peaked at number 70 on the US Billboard Album Sales Chart.)	22	28	132	—	—	62	—	— (Note: Away did not enter the UK Albums Chart, but peaked at number 67 on the UK Official Physical Album Chart.)	24	
In the Rainbow Rain	Released: April 27, 2018; Label: ATO Records	— (Note: In the Rainbow Rain did not enter the US Billboard 200, but peaked at number 93 on the US Billboard Album Sales Chart.)	15	—	—	—	—	69	—	— (Note: In the Rainbow Rain did not enter the UK Albums Chart, but peaked at number 81 on the UK Official Physical Album Chart.)	18	
"—" denotes a recording that did not chart or was not released in that territory

=== Split albums ===
- 2003 Julie Doiron / Okkervil River – Acuarela, split with Julie Doiron
- 2004 Sham Wedding/Hoax Funeral – Jound, split with Shearwater

=== EPs ===
- 1998 Bedroom EP – Jound
- 1999 Stars Too Small to Use – Jound
- 2004 Sleep and Wake-Up Songs – (Jagjaguwar)
- 2005 Black Sheep Boy Appendix – (Jagjaguwar/Low Transit Industries)
- 2006 Overboard & Down – Low Transit Industries, Australia-only tour EP
- 2018 New Blood – (ATO Records)

=== Other ===
- 2007 Black Sheep Boy (Definitive Edition) – Double album of Black Sheep Boy and Black Sheep Boy Appendix (Europe and US, Jagjaguwar)
- 2007 Golden Opportunities Mixtape – A collection of eight covers and one original song released on the band's website
- 2010 True Love Cast Out All Evil feat. Roky Erickson (ANTI-)
- 2011 Golden Opportunities 2 – EP with four covers and one traditional song, released via the band's website
- 2013 Golden Opportunities 3 – EP with five covers of popular songs from the 1980s
- 2020 A Dream in the Dark: Two Decades of Okkervil River Live – Live album of twenty-four songs spanning 2006 to 2019

=== Singles ===
- 1999 "The Velocity of Saul at the Time of His Conversion" – Jound, CD single
- 2000 "Kansas City Single" – Jound, CD single
- 2002 "Satisfy You" (split 7-inch with South San Gabriel – Tight Spot, 7-inch
- 2005 "For Real (There's Nothing Quite Like the Blinding Light)"' – Jagjaguwar, CD single
- 2006 "The President's Dead"' – Jagjaguwar, 12-inch
- 2007 "Our Life Is Not a Movie or Maybe" – Jagjaguwar 12-inch
- 2007 "Unless Its For Kicks" – Jagjaguwar, 12-inch
- 2008 "Lost Coastlines" – Jagjaguwar, 12-inch
- 2009 "Pop Lie" b/w "Millionaire" – Jagjaguwar, CD single
- 2011 "Mermaid" b/w "Walked Out on a Line" – Jagjaguwar, 12-inch vinyl/digital single
- 2011 "Wake and Be Fine" b/w "Weave Room Blues" – Jagjaguwar, 7-inch vinyl/digital single
- 2011 "Rider" b/w "I Guess We Lost", – Jagjaguwar 7-inch vinyl/digital single
- 2011 "Your Past Life As a Blast" b/w "Gold Faces", – Jagjaguwar 7-inch vinyl/digital single
- 2013 "It Was My Season" ATO digital single
- 2013 "Down Down The Deep River" ATO digital single
- 2014 "On A Balcony" ATO digital single
- 2014 "Where The Spirit Left Us" ATO digital single
- 2016 "Okkervill River R.I.P." ATO digital single
- 2016 "The Industry" ATO digital single
- 2017 "Mary On A Wave" ATO digital single
- 2017 "Call Yourself Renee" ATO digital single
- 2018 "Don't Move Back To LA" ATO digital single
- 2018 "Pull Up The Ribbon" ATO digital single
- 2018 "Love Somebody" ATO digital single
- 2018 "Famous Tracheotomies" ATO digital single
- 2018 "External Actor" ATO digital single

=== Compilation contributions ===
- 1999 "Omie Wise" (Live) – Aural Fixation: Local Live Vol. 5
- 2002 "Disfigured Cowboy" – Comes With A Smile CD
- 2003 "Riot Act" – Glurp / Almost You: The Songs of Elvis Costello
- 2004 "My Bad Days (Live)" – Comes With A Smile CD
- 2005 "Nancy (Live)" – I Eat Records / Appetizers & Leftovers
- 2005 "Your Other Man" – Summersteps Records / Down in a Mirror: A Second Tribute to Jandek
- 2005 "Westfall (Live)" – Workplay / Workplay Live
- 2009 "All You Little Suckers" (East River Pipe cover) – Merge Records / Score! 20 Years of Merge Records: The Covers!
- 2012 "It'll Never Happen Again" (Tim Hardin cover) – Full Time Hobby / Reason To Believe – The Songs Of Tim Hardin
- 2016 "Candle on the Water" (Helen Reddy cover) – Walt Disney Records / Pete's Dragon (Original Motion Picture Soundtrack)
- 2017 "Denomination Blues" – Our First 100 Days

== Members ==
Current members

- Will Sheff – vocals, guitar, keyboards (1998–present)
- Cully Symington – drums (2010–2014, 2015–present)
- Will Graefe – guitar, pedal steel guitar, backing vocals (2015–present)
- Sarah Pedinotti – keyboards, piano, synthesizer, backing vocals (2015–present)
- Benjamin Lazar Davis – bass guitar, backing vocals (2016–present)
- Jeremy Gustin – percussion (2018–present)

Former members

- Zachary Thomas – bass guitar (1998–2005, 2011, 2013), mandolin (1998–2005, 2007, 2008, 2011, 2013)
- Seth Warren – drums, backing vocals (1998–2000, 2003, 2005)
- Jonathan Meiburg – backing vocals (1999–2008), keyboards, piano, organ (1999–2008), accordion (1999)
- Mark Pedini – drums (2001–2003)
- Travis Nelsen – drums (2003–2010)
- Howard Draper – backing vocals (2003–2008, 2011, 2013); keyboards, piano, synthesizer (2003–2005); guitar, pedal steel guitar (2005–2008, 2011, 2013)
- Brian Cassidy – guitar, pedal steel guitar (2005–2014)
- Chris Heinrich – guitar, pedal steel guitar (2005)
- Scott Brackett – keyboards, backing vocals (2005–2010)
- Patrick Pestorius – bass guitar, backing vocals (2005–2013, 2015)
- Charles Bissell – guitar, backing vocals (2008)
- Justin Sherburn – keyboards, piano, synthesizer, backing vocals (2007–2016)
- Lauren Gurgiolo – guitar, pedal steel guitar (2008–2014)
- Michael St. Clair – keyboards, piano, synthesizer, horns (2011–2013, 2015–2016); bass guitar, backing vocals (2013–2015)
- Robi Gonzalez – drums (2014–2015)
