= Black Sheep Boy =

Studio album by Okkervil River
- Released: April 5, 2005
- Recorded: 2005
- Studios: Brian Beattie's Wonder Chamber, Austin, Texas
- Genres: Indie rock; folk rock; Americana rock Folk pop
- Length: 47:18
- Label: Jagjaguwar
- Producer: Okkervil River

Okkervil River chronology
Sleep and Wake-Up Songs (2004)	Black Sheep Boy (2005)	Black Sheep Boy Appendix (2005)

Black Sheep Boy is the third studio album by American indie rock band Okkervil River, released on April 5, 2005. The title is inspired by the song "Black Sheep Boy" by 1960s folk singer Tim Hardin. The album deals with Hardin's struggle with heroin addiction and Okkervil River lead singer Will Sheff's failed relationships and heartbreaks, and it features the fictional Black Sheep Boy as a recurring character throughout the album. The album cover features the work of Providence artist William Schaff.

== Background ==
Most of the songs for the record were written in February 2004 in Bloomington, Indiana by Will Sheff. Sheff describes the album's theme in a 2005 interview:

"The Black Sheep Boy is a fantastical character that crops up here and there on the album. In the lyrics pretty much anything in quotes is the voice of the Black Sheep Boy. I think a lot of the dirtier, rougher, more obtuse songs are the product of the Black Sheep Boy."

The writing of the album took place during a difficult time for the band. The relative lack of commercial success of their previous albums meant that the band's future was in doubt and Sheff was rendered homeless in order to make ends meet and afford the costs related to the band's commitments.

== Reception ==
Professional ratings
Aggregate scores
Source	Rating
Metacritic	86/100
Review scores
Source	Rating
AllMusic	3.5/5 stars
Alternative Press	5/5
The Boston Phoenix	3/4 stars
The Guardian	4/5 stars
Mojo	4/5 stars
Pitchfork	8.5/10
PopMatters	9/10
Q	4/5 stars
Slant Magazine	4/5 stars
Uncut	3/5 stars

Black Sheep Boy has received general acclaim. On the review aggregate site Metacritic, the album has a score of 86 out of 100, indicating "universal acclaim".

The album was ranked number 22 on Amazon.com's Top 50 Albums of 2005 list. The music online magazine Pitchfork placed Black Sheep Boy at number 174 on their list of top 200 albums of the 2000s.

In 2015, Okkervil River released an expanded three-disc re-issue of Black Sheep Boy to commemorate the album's 10th anniversary, including the Black Sheep Boy Appendix EP in its entirety and a disc consisting of previously unreleased covers.

== Track listing ==
=== Original release ===
No.	Title	Writer(s)	Length
1.	"Black Sheep Boy"	Tim Hardin	1:18
2.	"For Real"	Will Sheff	4:42
3.	"In a Radio Song"	Will Sheff	5:39
4.	"Black"	Will Sheff	4:39
5.	"Get Big"	Will Sheff	3:55
6.	"A King and a Queen"	Will Sheff	3:22
7.	"A Stone"	Will Sheff	5:23
8.	"The Latest Toughs"	Will Sheff	3:11
9.	"Song of Our So-Called Friend"	Will Sheff	3:23
10.	"So Come Back, I Am Waiting"	Will Sheff	8:03
11.	"A Glow"	Will Sheff	3:43

=== 10th Anniversary Edition Volume II: Black Sheep Boy Appendix ===
No.	Title	Writer(s)	Length
1.	"Missing Children"	Will Sheff	3:04
2.	"No Key, No Plan"	Will Sheff	3:00
3.	"A Garden"	Will Sheff	0:51
4.	"Black Sheep Boy #4"	Will Sheff	5:23
5.	"The Next Four Months"	Will Sheff	3:50
6.	"Another Radio Song"	Will Sheff	4:59
7.	"A Forest"	Will Sheff	1:24
8.	"Last Love Song for Now"	Will Sheff	6:00

=== 10th Anniversary Edition Volume III: There Swims a Swan ===
No.	Title	Writer(s)	Length
1.	"Goodnight, Irene"	Lead Belly	4:13
2.	"I'm in Love With Susan Smith"	Tom House	3:18
3.	"See See Rider"	Ma Rainey, Lena Arant	4:57
4.	"Knoxville Girl"	Traditional	3:50
5.	"Satan Is Real"	Charlie Louvin, Ira Louvin	1:52
6.	"Good Liquor Gonna Carry Me Down"	Big Bill Broonzy	3:03
7.	"Willow Tree"	Traditional	3:52
8.	"Moonshiner"	Traditional	1:58
9.	"Oh, The Wind and Rain"	Traditional	4:01
10.	"What Are They Doing in Heaven Today"	Charles Albert Tindley	3:16
11.	"Trouble in Mind"	Richard M. Jones	3:45

== Musicians ==
- Will Sheff – vocals, acoustic guitar, electric guitar, keyboards, wurlitzer
- Howard Draper – lap steel, pump organ, mandolin, bass, synthesizer
- Jonathan Meiburg – vocals, piano, wurlitzer, pump organ, Casio SK-1, electric guitar
- Travis Nelsen – vocals, drums, tambourine
- Zachary Thomas – vocals, bass, mandolin
- Seth Warren – electronics, drums, vibraphone, whirlies, shaker
- Amy Annelle – harmony vocals
- Brian Beattie – bowed bass, sampler, field recordings
- Rebecca Browne – violin
- Alison Derrick – viola
- Michael Kapinus – trumpet
- Caroline Slack – violin
- Ben Westney – cello
- Victoria Wolff – cello

== See also ==
- Black Sheep Boy Appendix
