= Kid Dakota =

American indie rock band

- Origin: Minneapolis, Minnesota, US
- Genre: Indie rock
- Years active: 2001–present
- Labels: Chairkickers' Union, Graveface Records, Speakerphone Records
- Spinoffs: Alva Star, The Hopefuls
- Members: Darren Jackson; Lars Oslund
- Past members: Christopher McGuire; Ian Prince; Brian Roessler; Peter Leggett; Jordan Koel
- Website: https://kiddakota.band/

Kid Dakota is the musical moniker of Darren Jackson, sometimes accompanied live or in the studio by various band members.

== History ==
Born in the small, isolated town of Bison, South Dakota, Jackson started performing as "Kid Dakota and the Tumbleweeds" in 1998 while living in Providence, Rhode Island. The name was chosen in homage to his home state of South Dakota and also as a parody of Kid Rock. In the summer of 1999, Darren recorded the five songs that would appear on the So Pretty EP with long-time friend and producer, Alex Oana, at City Cabin (formerly Blackberry Way). Darren moved to Minneapolis, Minnesota, that winter and self-released the So Pretty EP in the spring of 2000. The EP caught the attention of Alan Sparhawk, singer and guitarist for the slow-core band Low, and he offered to release the EP on his label, Chairkickers' Union, under the condition that it be expanded into a full-length LP. The LP version of So Pretty was released in the spring of 2002 with three additional songs.

In 2004, his second album, The West is the Future, was also released by Chairkickers. It was recorded live at Seedy Underbelly in Minneapolis by Alex Oana and featured Low bassist Zak Sally. A Winner's Shadow was released on March 11, 2008, on Graveface Records. Listen to the Crows as They Take Flight was released by Graveface in October 2011. A reissue campaign for So Pretty was announced in late 2017 and discussed on the podcast Conan Neutron's Protonic Reversal, as well as several new recordings. Denervation was released in February 2018, and a vinyl reissue of So Pretty followed in June, both through Graveface.

The latest Kid Dakota LP, Age of Roaches, was released in December 2020 through Graveface.

== Affiliated bands ==
- Low
- The Hopefuls
- Alva Star

== Discography ==
=== Albums ===
- So Pretty (Chairkickers' Union, 2002)
- The West Is the Future (Chairkickers' Union, 2004)
- A Winner's Shadow (Graveface Records, 2008)
- Listen To The Crows As They Take Flight (Graveface Records, 2011)
- Denervation (Graveface Records, 2018)
- Age of Roaches (Graveface Records, 2020)

• "Praegustator" (Graveface Records 2024)

=== Singles ===
- Get Her Out Of My Heart 7" (La Verdad Records, 2003)

== Other ==
- Contributed music to the 2007 documentary Urban Explorers: Into the Darkness
- Stuck on AM 4: Live Performances from Radio K
- Composed soundtrack to the 2015 movie Blunt Force Trauma
