= Jonathan Meiburg =

American musician and writer (born 1976)

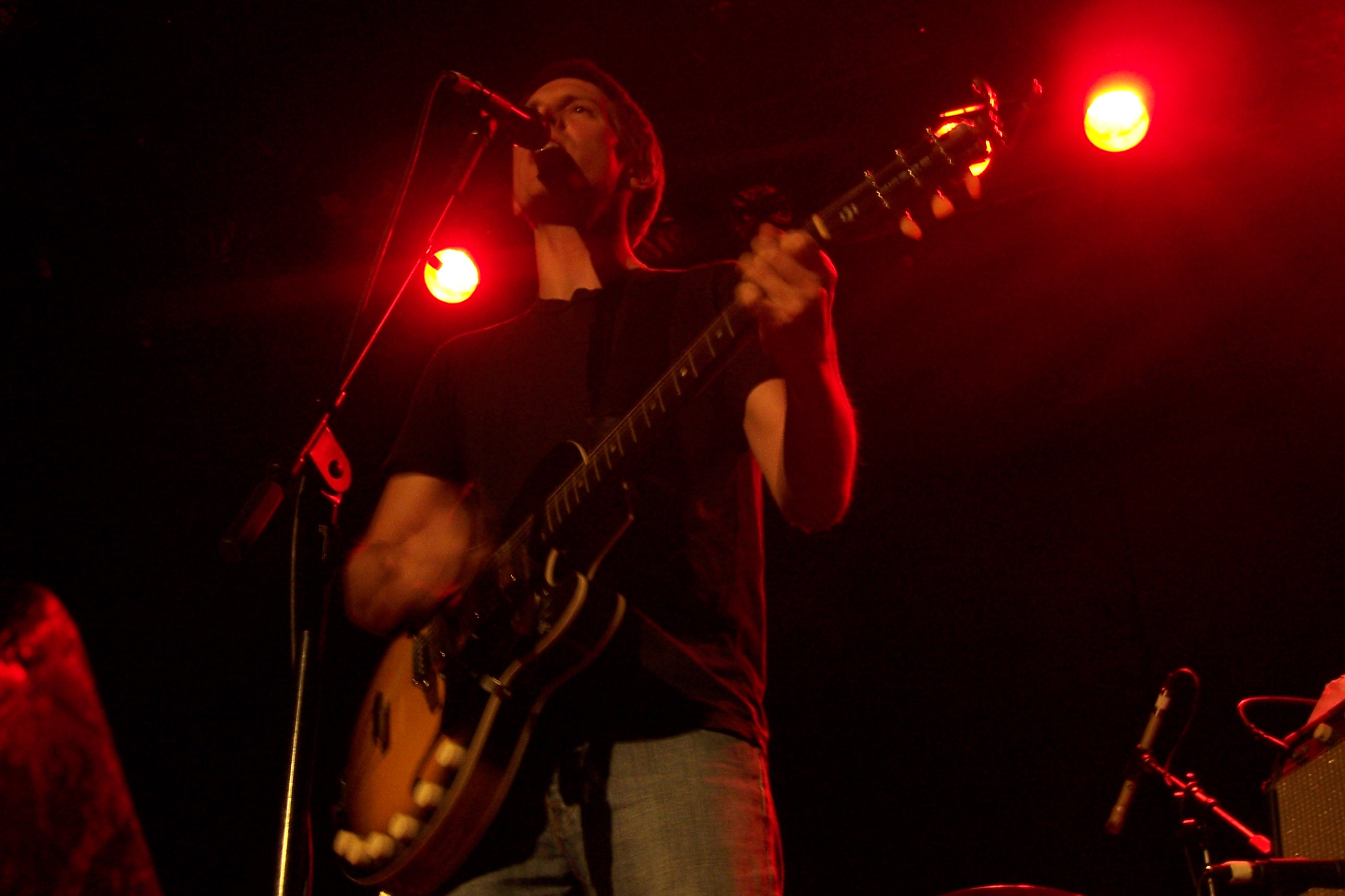

Background information
- Born: March 1, 1976 (age 50); Baltimore, Maryland, U.S.
- Genres: Rock, folk rock, indie rock
- Occupations: Singer-songwriter, author
- Instruments: Vocals, guitar, piano, organ, synthesizer
- Years active: 1998–present
- Labels: Graveface, Sub Pop (as Shearwater)

Jonathan Albert Meiburg is an American musician and writer, best known as the lead singer and songwriter for Shearwater.

== Early life and education ==
Meiburg was born in Baltimore, Maryland on March 1, 1976. His father, Stan Meiburg, was an influential environmental policy professional who served as Deputy Administrator of the Environmental Protection Agency. Meiburg grew up in Raleigh, North Carolina.

He earned his bachelor's degree in English with a minor in religion from the University of the South in Sewanee, Tennessee, and received a Thomas J. Watson Fellowship to study daily life in remote human communities. After a year spent in such diverse places as the Falkland Islands (Malvinas), Tierra del Fuego, the Aboriginal settlement of Kowanyama in Australia, the Chatham Islands of New Zealand, and the Inuit settlement of Kimmirut in Baffin Island, Canada, he enrolled at the University of Texas at Austin, where he earned a master's degree in geography with a thesis titled "The Biogeography of striated caracaras (Phalcoboenus australis)".

== Career ==
=== Music career ===
Meiburg first started his public musical career with Whu Gnu in 1993 in Austin, Texas. He first came to national prominence collaborating with Will Sheff on multiple projects. Meiburg played keyboards in a band led by Sheff called Okkervil River, and both men wrote songs for a new project Meiburg named Shearwater, whose name came from Meiburg's interest in birds. Due to the increased popularity of Shearwater and touring conflicts between the two acts, however, Meiburg left Okkervil River in May 2008.

Meiburg has performed and recorded as a solo artist. Buteo Buteo is a collection of early acoustic guitar and bass songs, self-published through Shearwater's Bandcamp site. Why I Love My Home (Songs for Charles Burchfield) was initially a collaboration with Andy Stack of Wye Oak for the Whitney Museum of Art, but was recorded solo in the studio and self-released in 2011.

In 2010, he collaborated with Jamie Stewart of Xiu Xiu on a recording project named Blue Water White Death. Their debut album was released in October 2010 on Graveface Records.

Since 2017, Meiburg has been collaborating with Cross Record's Emily Cross and Dan Duszynski as the group Loma. Their self-titled debut album came out in February 2018 on the Sub Pop label, which is also home to Shearwater. Their second album, Don't Shy Away, released in October 2020, features a mix by Brian Eno on the song "Homing."

He has also played live and recorded with Bill Callahan, Sharon Van Etten, Wye Oak, and others.

=== Writing career ===
In November 2014, Meiburg announced via the Shearwater Facebook page that he had signed a contract to write his first book, which describes the evolutionary history of South America through the eyes of a family of falcons known as caracaras, for US publisher Knopf and UK publisher Bodley Head. The book, entitled A Most Remarkable Creature: The Hidden Life and Epic Journey of the World's Smartest Birds of Prey, draws upon his longtime research into the subject and his travels in South America. It was released in March 2021. The book was longlisted for the 2022 Andrew Carnegie Medal for Excellence in Nonfiction and named one of the best books of the year by NPR.

He has published articles in various national and international publications on a wide range of topics: interviews with producer and musician Brian Reitzell for Tape Op, with author and human rights activist Zainab Salbi in The Believer; a history of dioramas of the Whitney Wing of the American Museum of Natural History for The Appendix; and numerous articles for online music magazine The Talkhouse, including a personal perspective on touring, an account of a presentation by Brian Eno, and a review of David Bowie's The Next Day. His interview with author Peter Matthiessen, also for The Believer, was one of the last before Matthiessen's death in 2014.

== Discography ==
- 2004: Buteo Buteo by Jonathan Meiburg (self-released)
- 2010: Blue Water White Death by Blue Water White Death (a collaboration between Jonathan Meiburg and Jamie Stewart of Xiu Xiu) (Graveface)
- 2011: Why I Love My Home by Jonathan Meiburg (self-released)
