= Will Sheff =

American musician

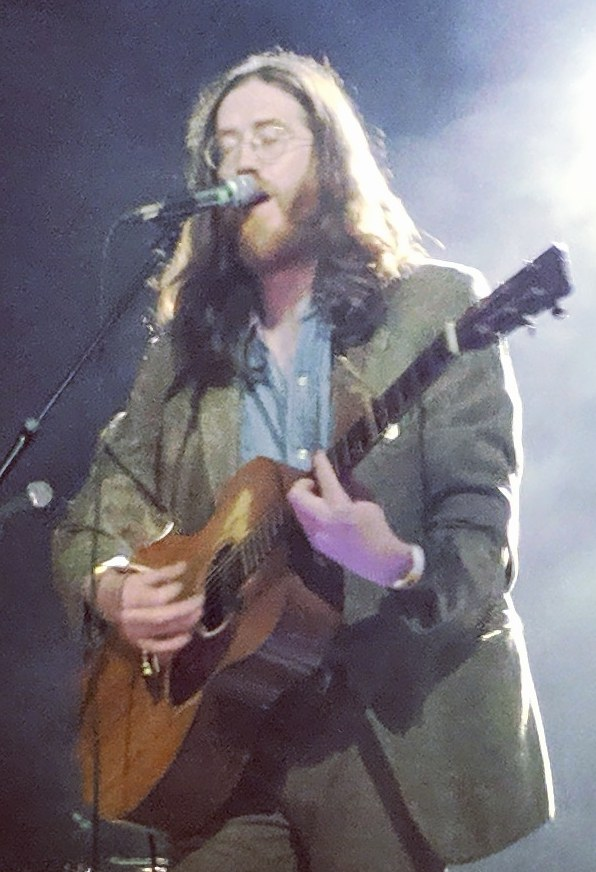
- Sheff performing in Toronto at the Great Hall (2019)

Background information
- Born: July 7, 1976 (age 50); New Hampshire, U.S.
- Genres: Rock; folk rock; indie rock
- Occupations: Singer; songwriter
- Instruments: Vocals; guitar; piano
- Years active: 1998–present

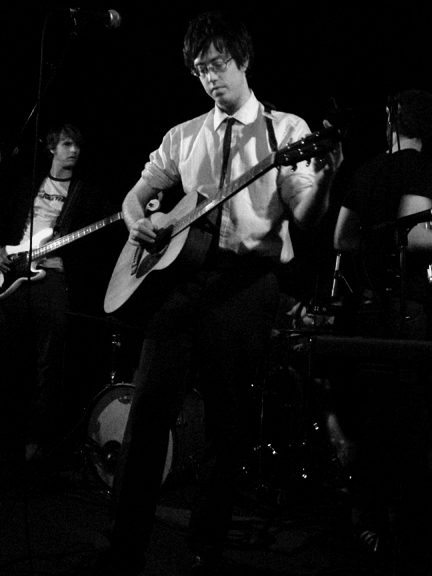
Sheff performing in San Francisco, California with Okkervil River (2005)

Will Robinson Sheff (born July 7, 1976) is the frontman for the Austin, Texas-based indie band Okkervil River (1998–present). Originally from Meriden, New Hampshire, he is also a founding member and co-songwriter (along with former Okkervil bandmate Jonathan Meiburg) for Shearwater (2001–2009), another Austin band. Sheff writes and performs many songs as a solo artist while juggling his commitments to Okkervil River and Shearwater, and has released two albums as a solo artist. As well as writing and singing songs, he plays guitar, piano, banjo, and harmonica.

Sheff attended Kimball Union Academy, where his creativity was encouraged by a teacher named Simon Harrold, and was an English major at Macalester College in Saint Paul, Minnesota.

Sheff has collaborated with The Mendoza Line on the duet "Aspect of an Old Maid" and played the piano on the Palaxy Tracks album Cedarland. With Okkervil River, he produced Roky Erickson's 2010 album True Love Cast Out All Evil and provided backing musicianship. He has produced an upcoming album by the Brooklyn-based band Bird of Youth along with Phil Palazzolo.

Sheff contributed a large amount of original music writing to the articles section of Audiogalaxy before the service was shut down.

He also contributed background vocals to The New Pornographers' 2010 album, Together.

In the fall of 2022, Sheff released Nothing Special, his first full-length solo album on ATO Records.

== Discography ==
=== Albums ===
- Nothing Special (ATO Records, 2022)
- Extra Mile (2026)

=== Singles ===
- Will Sheff Covers Charles Bissell, Charles Bissell Covers Will Sheff (Jagjaguwar, 2008)
