= Are We There =

Studio album by Sharon Van Etten
- Released: May 27, 2014
- Studio: Hobo Sound (Weehawken, New Jersey, United States); Electric Lady (New York City, New York, United States)
- Genre: Indie rock; folk rock; soul
- Length: 47:03
- Label: Jagjaguwar
- Producer: Sharon Van Etten; Stewart Lerman

Sharon Van Etten chronology
| Tramp (2012) | Are We There (2014) | I Don't Want to Let You Down (2015) |

Singles from Are We There
- 1. "Taking Chances" Released: March 4, 2014; 2. "Every Time The Sun Comes Up" Released: May 13, 2014; 3. "Our Love" Released: July 13, 2014; 4. "Your Love Is Killing Me" Released: October 28, 2014

Are We There is the fourth studio album by the American singer-songwriter Sharon Van Etten. It was released on May 27, 2014 via Jagjaguwar.

== Background ==
Are We There draws from musical influences including Glass Candy, Chromatics, Lee Hazlewood, Low, Bob Dylan, the War on Drugs, Meg Baird, Bobby Womack, Colin Newman, Suicide, OMD, and PJ Harvey.

== Packaging ==
Of the lack of a question mark in the album's title, Van Etten said it was "… open-ended, I ask myself that question all the time, for my work, for my love, even for my friends. It's just really good to check in with yourself and it's a play on words, about touring and about travelling, being in transition."

== Reception ==
Professional ratings
Aggregate scores
| Source | Rating |
|---|---|
| AnyDecentMusic? | 8.3/10 |
| Metacritic | 86/100 |
Review scores
| Source | Rating |
| AllMusic | 4/5 stars |
| The A.V. Club | A− |
| Chicago Tribune | 3.5/4 stars |
| The Guardian | 3/5 stars |
| The Independent | 5/5 stars |
| NME | 8/10 |
| Pitchfork | 8.2/10 |
| Q | 4/5 stars |
| Rolling Stone | 4/5 stars |
| Uncut | 9/10 |

Upon its release Are We There received widespread critical acclaim. At Metacritic, which assigns a normalized rating out of 100 to reviews from mainstream publications, the album received an average score of 86, based on 36 reviews, indicating "universal acclaim". Fred Thomas of AllMusic rated Are We There four-out-of-five stars, in particular praising the album's "inventive arrangements and advances in songwriting", which he referred to as "an undeniable step forward for Van Etten". In Rolling Stone, Will Hermes also rated Are We There four-out-of-five stars, writing that "like Nick Cave, [Van Etten's] darkness contains multitudes" and calling the album "magnificent" and one "which grows her trademark examinations of romantic decay to cathedral-like scale." The A.V. Club's Emily St. James summarized that "Are We There offers an artist in full command of her voice and her instrument" and called it a "punishing epic of an album, intense and bruised and haunted", ultimately awarding it an A− rating.

Pitchfork writer Stephen M. Deusner called Are We There "the peak of a steady upward trajectory", describing how it was more "self-determined and self-directed" than Van Etten's previous albums, Because I Was in Love (2009), Epic (2010) and Tramp (2012). In NME, Cian Traynor made a similar observation, writing that Are We There is "less jagged and more finessed than its intricately layered predecessor … The songs are slower and spacious enough to keep their clarity intact". Traynor further praised the album's arrangements and Van Etten's emotional delivery, awarding it an eight-out-of-ten rating. However, writing for The Guardian, Tim Jonze offered a more mixed review criticizing how Van Etten's songwriting on Are We There "conforms to accomplished but trad indie-rock norm". Jonze did, however, appreciate the album's "unusual harmonies", "orchestral slow build" and referred to "Every Time the Sun Comes Up" as a "stirring closing number" in his three-out-of-five-star review.

=== Accolades ===
Due to its high rating of 86 on Metacritic, Are We There became the fifth-most critically acclaimed album of 2014. In addition, it placed in several year-end lists. The album was placed at number 20 on Rolling Stone's list of the "50 Best Albums of 2014." Likewise, NME placed the album at number 31 on their list, while Q placed it at number 7. Jessica Goodman and Ryan Kistobak of The Huffington Post included the album on their list of 2014's best releases, calling the album "earnest and tragic". In 2019, Pitchfork ranked Are We There at number 174 on their list of "The 200 Best Albums of the 2010s"; contributing editor Jayson Greene wrote: "Are We There was a great deepening—of Sharon Van Etten’s emotional range, of the power of her songwriting, and of the potency of her voice."

== Track listing ==
| No. | Title | Length |
|---|---|---|
| 1. | "Afraid of Nothing" | 4:05 |
| 2. | "Taking Chances" | 3:50 |
| 3. | "Your Love Is Killing Me" | 6:18 |
| 4. | "Our Love" | 3:53 |
| 5. | "Tarifa" | 4:51 |
| 6. | "I Love You But I'm Lost" | 4:19 |
| 7. | "You Know Me Well" | 4:32 |
| 8. | "Break Me" | 4:01 |
| 9. | "Nothing Will Change" | 3:16 |
| 10. | "I Know" | 3:36 |
| 11. | "Every Time the Sun Comes Up" | 4:23 |
| Total length: | | 47:03 |

Japanese CD digital download bonus tracks
| No. | Title | Length |
|---|---|---|
| 1. | "Afraid of Nothing" (Demo) |
| 2. | "Taking Chances" (Demo) |
| 3. | "Break Me" (Demo) |

== Personnel ==
All personnel credits adapted from Are We There's album notes.

Musicians

- Sharon Van Etten – vocals (1–11), guitar (1–5, 7–9), piano (1, 4, 6, 7, 10), organ (2–4, 7, 9), Omnichord (2, 4, 8, 11), bass (2), drums (4, 6–8), synthesizer (8), claps (11)
- David Hartley – bass (1, 4, 5, 7–9, 11), bass synthesizer (3), baritone guitar (3), guitar (4, 8, 11), backing vocals (11), claps (11)
- Zeke Hutchins – drums (1–5, 7–9, 11), percussion (4, 5, 9), backing vocals (10), claps (11)
- Heather Woods Broderick – strings (1), backing vocals (1–3, 5–7, 9, 11), electric piano (7)
- Jonathan Meiburg – guitar (1, 4, 5), organ (4, 5), electric piano (5)
- Jacob C. Morris – electric piano (2), organ (3, 5), piano (3, 7)
- Doug Keith – guitar (2, 8, 11), bowed guitar (7)
- Adam Granduciel – guitar (4, 11), electric piano (11)
- Stewart Lerman – piano (1), organ (1, 4)
- Stuart Bogie – woodwinds (5, 9)
- Mickey Free – beats (2, 4, 8)
- Mackenzie Scott – backing vocals (1, 4)

Musicians (continued)

- Mary Lattimore – harp (4, 8)
- Marisa Anderson – guitar (1)
- Peter Broderick – strings (1)
- Jana Hunter – backing vocals (2)
- Little Isidore – backing vocals (1)

Technical personnel

- Sharon Van Etten – production
- Stewart Lerman – production, mixing (1, 5, 7, 9–11)
- James Frazee – recording
- Richard Swift – mixing (2–4, 6, 8)

Design personnel

- Martine Franck – photography
- Dusdin Condren – photography (inner sleeve)

== Charts ==
| Chart (2014) | Peak position |
|---|---|
| Belgian Albums (Ultratop Flanders) | 123 |
| Belgian Albums (Ultratop Wallonia) | 164 |
| Irish Albums (IRMA) | 30 |
| Irish Independent Albums (IRMA) | 6 |
| UK Albums (Official Charts) | 27 |
| UK Independent Albums (Official Charts) | 19 |
| US Billboard 200 | 25 |
| US Top Alternative Albums (Billboard) | 6 |
| US Top Rock Albums (Billboard) | 7 |
| Chart (2015) | Peak position |
| New Zealand Albums (RMNZ) | 33 |
