= Remind Me Tomorrow =

Studio album by Sharon Van Etten
- Released: January 18, 2019
- Studios: Sargent Recorders; Studio 64; Elmwood West; (Los Angeles)
- Length: 41:12
- Label: Jagjaguwar
- Producer: John Congleton

Sharon Van Etten chronology
Are We There (2014)	Remind Me Tomorrow (2019)	We've Been Going About This All Wrong (2022)

Singles from Remind Me Tomorrow
- 1. "Comeback Kid" Released: October 30, 2018; 2. "Jupiter 4" Released: November 27, 2018; 3. "Seventeen" Released: January 8, 2019; 4. "No One's Easy to Love" Released: June 19, 2019

Remind Me Tomorrow is the fifth studio album by American singer-songwriter Sharon Van Etten, released on January 18, 2019, by Jagjaguwar. A follow-up to Are We There (2014), the album was written while Van Etten was pregnant with her first child, attending school to obtain a degree in psychology, acting in the Netflix series The OA (2016), and making a cameo in Twin Peaks (2017).

== Critical reception ==
Professional ratings
Aggregate scores
Source	Rating
AnyDecentMusic?	8.2/10
Metacritic	86/100
Review scores
Source	Rating
AllMusic	4.5/5 stars
The A.V. Club	B+
Chicago Tribune	3.5/4 stars
The Guardian	4/5 stars
The Independent	4/5 stars
NME	4/5 stars
The Observer	4/5 stars
Pitchfork	8.4/10
Rolling Stone	4/5 stars
Vice (Expert Witness)	A−

At Metacritic, which assigns a normalized rating out of 100 to reviews from mainstream critics, Remind Me Tomorrow has received an average score of 86, based on 34 reviews, indicating "universal acclaim". Ellen Johnson of Paste called it "the first great rock album of" 2019 and called Van Etten "one of the great lyricists of the 2010s". At Pitchfork, Laura Snapes mentioned how Van Etten "conjures tempests and explores their subsequent calms", remarking that it is "the peak of her songwriting and her most atmospheric, emotionally piercing album to date." Stephen Thomas Erlewine of AllMusic rated the album four-and-a-half stars out of five, writing that Van Etten "plumbs the depths of contentedness, setting her satisfaction to a sound that's nominally dark yet strangely comforting and nourishing." Rolling Stone considered Remind Me Tomorrow as her finest album for including styles ranging from "expansive electro groove" to "trip-hop rumination" and singer "Siouxsie [Sioux]-style wails".

== Accolades ==
Publication	Accolade	Rank	Ref.
The A.V. Club	Top 20 Albums of 2019	18	
BrooklynVegan	Top 50 Albums of 2019	3	
Clash	Top 40 Albums of 2019	17	
Consequence of Sound	Top 25 Albums of 2019 (Mid-Year)	2	
Consequence of Sound	Top 50 Albums of 2019	2	
Double J	Top 50 Albums of 2019	10	
Exclaim!	Top 29 Albums of 2019 (Mid-Year)	1	
Fopp	Top 20 Albums of 2019	1	
Gaffa	Top 30 Albums of 2019	7	
Gothamist	Top 26 Albums of 2019	6	
The Guardian	Top 50 Albums of 2019	4	
The Line of Best Fit	Top 50 Albums of 2019	16	
Magnet	Top 25 Albums of 2019	21	
MusicOMH	Top 50 Albums of 2019	9	
No Ripcord	Top 50 Albums of 2019	3	
NPR Music	Top 25 Albums of 2019	6	
Paste	Top 25 Albums of 2019 (Mid-Year)	3	
Paste	Top 50 Albums of 2019	3	
Pitchfork	The 50 Best Albums of 2019	32	
PopMatters	Top 70 Albums of 2019	12	
Q	Top 50 Albums of 2019	13	
Rolling Stone	Top 50 Albums of 2019	27	
Spectrum Culture	Top 20 Albums of 2019	7	
Stereogum	Top 50 Albums of 2019 (Mid-Year)	37	
Thrillist	Top 25 Albums of 2019	7	
The Wild Honey Pie	Top 30 Albums of 2019	7	
Under the Radar	Top 100 Albums of 2019	7	

== Track listing ==
All tracks are written by Sharon Van Etten, unless otherwise noted.

No.	Title	Writer(s)	Length
1.	"I Told You Everything"		4:45
2.	"No One's Easy to Love"		4:34
3.	"Memorial Day"		4:27
4.	"Comeback Kid"	Van Etten; Sam Cohen	3:02
5.	"Jupiter 4"	Van Etten; Donna Missal; Nate Mercereau	5:14
6.	"Seventeen"	Van Etten; Kate Davis	4:25
7.	"Malibu"		3:23
8.	"You Shadow"		3:14
9.	"Hands"		4:08
10.	"Stay"		4:00
Total length:			41:12

Notes

- "Jupiter 4" is a reworking of "Jupiter" by Donna Missal, from her 2018 album This Time.

== Personnel ==
All personnel credits adapted from Remind Me Tomorrow's album notes.

Performers

- Sharon Van Etten – vocals (1–10), piano (1, 6, 7), organ (4, 8, 10)
- Heather Woods Broderick – backing vocals (1–10), synthesizer (10), electric piano (10)
- Zachary Dawes – bass (1, 3–9), synthesizer (6)
- McKenzie Smith – drums (1, 4, 6, 8, 9), percussion (8)
- Luke Reynolds – lap steel guitar (1, 8), guitar (3, 6–9), tape loops (4), synthesizer (6, 7, 9), keyboards (8), celesta (8), bass (10)
- John Congleton – synthesizer (1–7, 9, 10), drone (1, 3, 5, 6), drum programming (2, 5, 6), percussion (2, 6, 9), organ (3), tape loops (3), drum machine (4, 5), theremin (5), loops (9), sequencer (10)
- Jamie Stewart – synthesizer (1, 3, 5), vocals (1, 9), guitar (5, 9), bells (5), percussion (5)
- Lars Horntveth – guitar (2, 4, 10), synthesizer (2), woodwinds (8), piano (10), celesta (10)
- Brian Reitzell – drums (2, 7), organ (6), percussion (6), drone (6), cymbal (9)
- Joey Waronker – drums (3, 5)
- Stella Mozgawa – drums (10)

Technical personnel

- John Congleton – production, engineering, mixing
- Sean Cook – additional engineering
- Tyler Karmen – additional engineering
- Greg Calbi – mastering
- JN-H – lacquer cutting

Design personnel

- Nathaniel David Utesch – design, layout
- Katherine Dieckmann – photography (front cover)
- Rob Houston – photography (inner sleeve)
- Maya Judd – photography (inner sleeve)
- Len Prince – photographer (inner sleeve, back cover)

== Chart positions ==
Chart (2019)	Peak position
Belgian Albums (Ultratop Flanders)	49
Belgian Albums (Ultratop Wallonia)	131
Dutch Albums (Album Top 100)	88
French Albums (SNEP)	134
Irish Albums (Official Charts)	49
Irish Independent Albums (IRMA)	3
Portuguese Albums (AFP)	10
Scottish Albums (Official Charts)	14
Swiss Albums (Schweizer Hitparade)	39
UK Albums (Official Charts)	30
UK Album Downloads (Official Charts)	16
UK Independent Albums (Official Charts)	3
US Billboard 200	94
US Top Alternative Albums (Billboard)	11
US Top Rock Albums (Billboard)	15
