= Sharon Van Etten =

American singer-songwriter (born 1981)

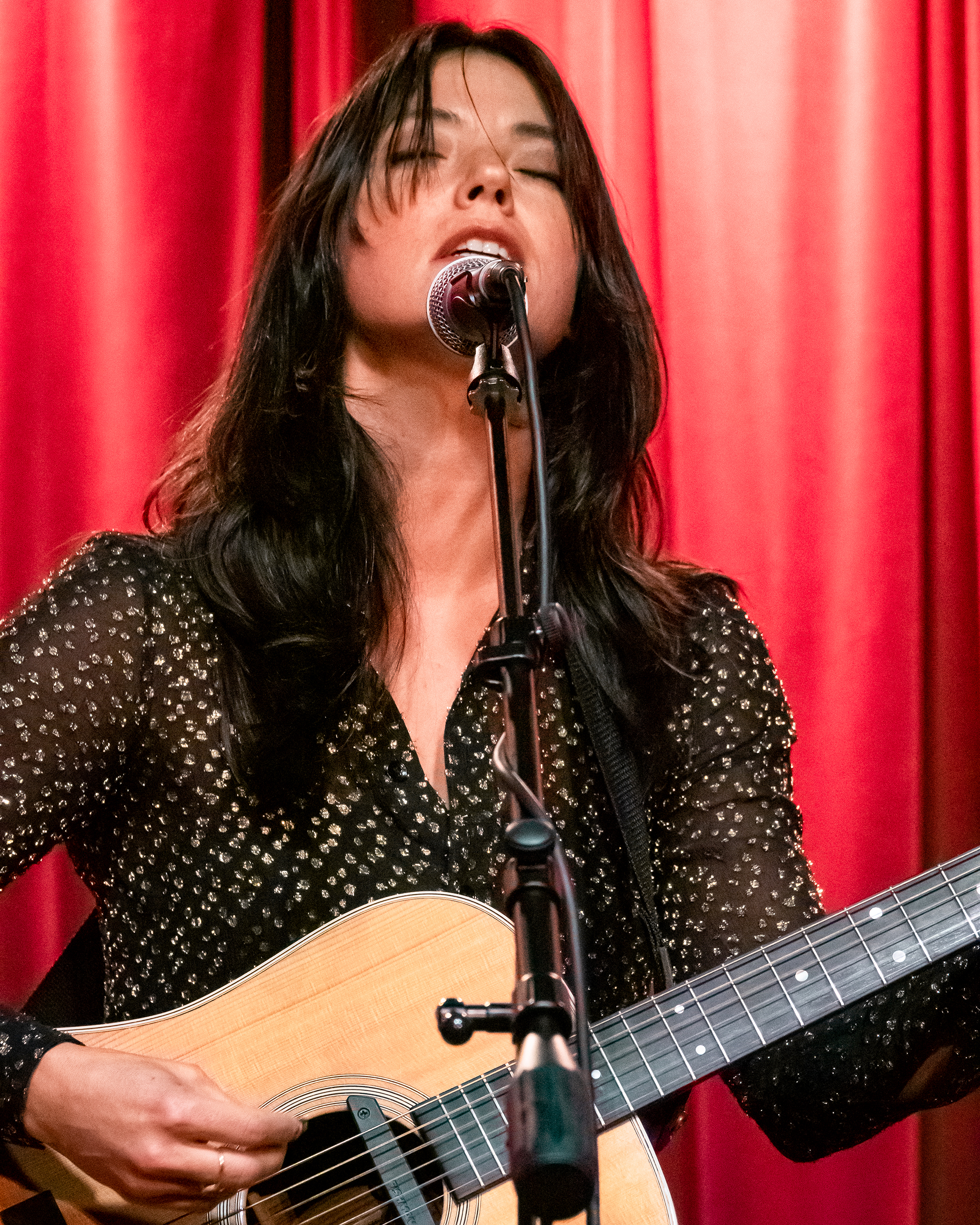
- Van Etten performing in 2019

Background information
- Born: Sharon Katharine Van Etten; February 26, 1981 (age 45); Belleville, New Jersey, U.S.
- Genres: Indie rock; indie folk
- Occupations: Singer-songwriter; musician
- Instruments: Vocals; guitar; bass; piano; percussion; omnichord; harmonium
- Years active: 2007–present
- Labels: Jagjaguwar; Ba Da Bing; Language of Stone
- Member of: The Attachment Theory
- Website: sharonvanetten.com

Sharon Katharine Van Etten (born February 26, 1981) is an American singer-songwriter, musician and actress. Originally from New Jersey, and currently based in Los Angeles, Van Etten's music is noted for its indie rock aesthetic and personal lyrical content. In the studio and during live performances, Van Etten is currently accompanied by her backing band, the Attachment Theory, which consists of Devra Hoff (bass guitar, backing vocals), Teeny Lieberson (keyboards, guitar, backing vocals) and Jorge Balbi (drums).

To date, Van Etten has released seven studio albums: Because I Was in Love (2009), Epic (2010), Tramp (2012), Are We There (2014), Remind Me Tomorrow (2019), We've Been Going About This All Wrong (2022) and Sharon Van Etten & the Attachment Theory (2025).

As an actress, Van Etten starred as Rachel in both series of the Netflix mystery drama The OA (2016–2019), and has appeared in the feature films Never Rarely Sometimes Always (2020) and How It Ends (2021).

== Early life ==
Van Etten was born in Belleville, New Jersey, the middle child of five. She lived in Nutley, New Jersey, then moved to Clinton, New Jersey as a pre-teen. Van Etten attended North Hunterdon High School, at which she participated in the chorus and performed in stage musicals.

Later, Van Etten moved to Murfreesboro, Tennessee to attend Middle Tennessee State University and studied recording, but dropped out after a year. She ended up working at the Red Rose, a coffee and record shop and music venue in Murfreesboro for about five years. She fell into an abusive relationship with a rock musician who discouraged her from writing songs. After five years, she left in the middle of the night with whatever she could carry.

Van Etten lived in Brooklyn, New York for a number of years; she resided in the neighborhood of Ditmas Park.

== Career ==
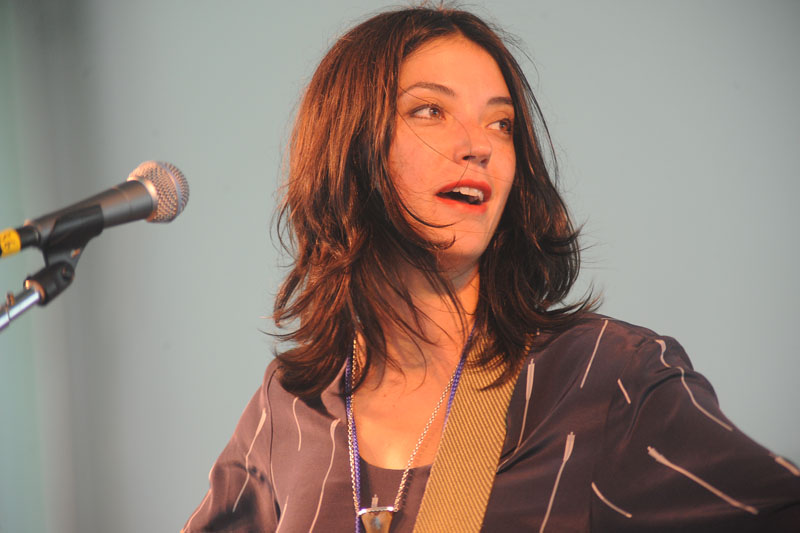
Van Etten performing at the 2012 Newport Folk Festival in Rhode Island

=== 2007–2010: Because I Was in Love and Epic ===
Van Etten self-released handmade CDs until 2009, when her debut studio recording was released. Before her studio debut, she worked at Astor Wines and as a publicist at Ba Da Bing Records.

Van Etten's debut, Because I Was in Love, was released on May 26, 2009, on Language of Stone, and was manufactured and distributed by Drag City. Because I Was in Love was produced by Greg Weeks at Hexham Head studio in Philadelphia.

On September 21, 2010, Van Etten released her second studio album, Epic, on Ba Da Bing Records. With no set band at the time, Van Etten called on friends Jeffrey Kish, Dave Hartley, Jessica Larrabee, and Andy LaPlant of She Keeps Bees, Cat Martino, Meg Baird, Jim Callan, and Brian Christinzio. The first song recorded for the album was "Love More", recorded in December 2009 by record producer Brian McTear for Weathervane Music's Shaking Through documentary video series. The remainder of the album was produced by Brian McTear with engineer Amy Morrissey in May 2010 at Miner Street Recordings in Philadelphia. NPR described it as possessing "a fuller sound compared to the super-spare arrangements on her first two self-produced albums, but Epic still feels incredibly intimate, with lots of room to breathe and unfold."

=== 2011–2015: Tramp and Are We There ===
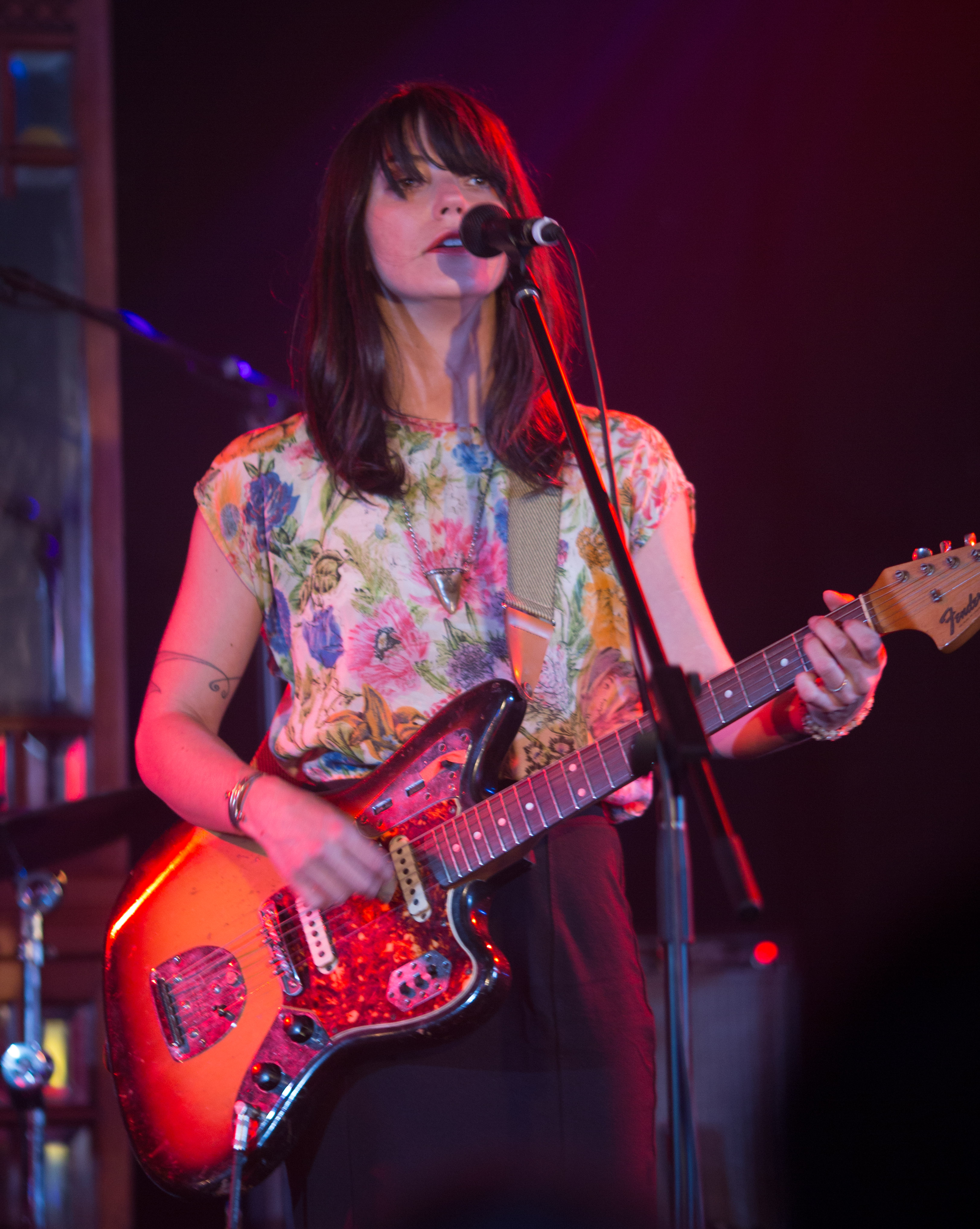
Van Etten performing in 2013

Van Etten's third studio album, Tramp, was released on February 7, 2012, on Jagjaguwar. Tramp was produced by the National's Aaron Dessner and recorded in his home studio in Brooklyn, New York. Additional recording took place at Miner Street Recordings in Philadelphia, where the album was also mixed with engineers and mixers Brian McTear and Jonathan Low. The album features musicians Doug Keith, Thomas Bartlett, Bryan Devendorf, Bryce Dessner, Matt Barrick, Rob Moose, Julianna Barwick, Peter Silberman, Logan Coale, Clarice Jensen, Ben Lanz, Zach Condon, and Jenn Wasner.

May 2014 brought about the release of Van Etten's fourth studio album, titled Are We There, on Jagjaguwar. Van Etten produced the record with Stewart Lerman, with the guidance of bandmate and manager Zeke Hutchins. Most of the recording was done at Hobo Sound Studios in Weehawken, New Jersey, with piano tracks being recorded at Electric Lady Studios in New York City. The record features musicians Zeke Hutchins, Doug Keith, Heather Woods Broderick, Dave Hartley, Adam Granduciel, Marisa Anderson, Stuart Bogie, Mickey Free, Mary Lattimore, Little Isidor, Jacob Morris, Torres' Mackenzie Scott, Shearwater's Jonathan Meiburg, Lower Dens' Jana Hunter, and Efterklang touring member Peter Broderick. The extended play (EP), I Don't Want to Let You Down, a compilation of songs that were not included on Are We There, was released on Jagjaguwar in 2015.

=== 2016–2022: Remind Me Tomorrow and We've Been Going About This All Wrong ===
After the release of Are We There, Van Etten took some time away from music. She pursued acting, had a child, and applied to Brooklyn College to study psychology and mental health counseling. Van Etten composed the score for the film Strange Weather (2016), working on the music in a practice space she shared with Michael Cera. In between working on the music for the film she recorded dozens of demos for new songs, which would form the basis for her next album.

In 2018, Van Etten released a new track, "Comeback Kid", and announced her next studio album Remind Me Tomorrow, released on January 18, 2019. Remind Me Tomorrow was a departure from Van Etten's previous guitar-focused work, featuring more synthesizers, drums, and experimental sounds.

In 2019, Van Etten moved with her son and partner to Los Angeles, California. She stated her desire with the move was to settle down and diversify her career to be less reliant on traveling tours. The COVID-19 pandemic in 2020 scuttled those plans, and during the resulting lockdowns Van Etten wrote songs that focused on her new life as well as the wider political landscape and "collective trauma" people were experiencing.

Van Etten played bass guitar and sang harmony vocals as the three surviving members of the rock band Fountains of Wayne performed in a televised benefit with various New Jersey-affiliated musicians to raise funds for COVID-19 relief in April 2020. She filled the role left vacant by the COVID-19-related death of Adam Schlesinger a few weeks earlier. She and the other three members of the band played simultaneously from remote locations. The band played the song "Hackensack" from their third studio album Welcome Interstate Managers (2003).

On May 15, 2020, Van Etten released a cover version of Brinsley Schwarz's 1974 song "(What's So Funny 'Bout) Peace, Love, and Understanding" with Queens of the Stone Age frontman Josh Homme.

In October 2020, Van Etten made a song titled "Let Go" for the documentary film, Feels Good Man, directed by Arthur Jones about cartoonist Matt Furie, the creator of the Internet meme Pepe the Frog.

On November 16, 2020, Van Etten released two cover versions of traditional holiday songs, "Silent Night" and "Blue Christmas".

On May 20, 2021, Van Etten released a single with Angel Olsen, "Like I Used To," which was produced by John Congleton. Olsen and Van Etten appear in the music video with their hair styled in similar shag haircuts.

In July 2021, Van Etten took part in the Newport Folk Festival.

On May 6, 2022, Van Etten released her sixth studio album We've Been Going About This All Wrong.

=== 2023–present: Sharon Van Etten & the Attachment Theory ===
On August 23, 2024, ten years after the initial release of her fourth studio album Are We There, Van Etten released the single "Every Time the Sun Comes Up" (Alternate Version) on 7 inch vinyl.

In February 2025, she released Sharon Van Etten & the Attachment Theory which received "universal praise" on Metacritic.

== Influences and musical style ==
Van Etten cites Ani DiFranco as a key influence, saying, "She was the first musician I had ever heard whose songs were super confessional. She could really play guitar... That was my first experience with non-pop female musicians. She made me want to start playing more."

Van Etten possesses a contralto vocal range, which Caleb Caldwell of Slant described as "husky". NPR described her vocals as raspy, elegant and luminous, while Consequence called it "earthy". Music journalists of The Guardian, Rolling Stone and The Independent wrote that Van Etten's voice and singing style sometimes evoked Siouxsie Sioux's of Siouxsie and the Banshees. Van Etten's music is characterized by a heavy use of harmonies. Pitchfork described her songs as having "echoes of folk tradition." NPR Music asserts: "Her songs are heartfelt without being overly earnest; her poetry is plainspoken but not overt, and her elegant voice is wrapped in enough rasp and sorrow to keep from sounding too pure or confident." With "Comeback Kid" and Remind Me Tomorrow, Van Etten introduced electronic sounds into her music. She has said, "I listen to a lot of OMD... I'm into a lot of the new post-punk electronic stuff."

Van Etten has also cited Scott Walker, Cocteau Twins, Rowland S. Howard, Joy Division, Roy Orbison, and Celine Dion as some of her musical influences. In a 2020 interview, when asked about a few albums that mean the most to her, she named John Cale's Fear (1974), Fleetwood Mac's Tusk (1979), and Nick Cave and the Bad Seeds' No More Shall We Part (2001).

== Acting ==
Since 2016, Van Etten has appeared in both seasons of the Netflix drama The OA as Rachel, a fellow abductee along with Prairie in Dr. Percy's basement lab/terrarium. Rachel and the other captives are subjected to after-life experiments while conspiring over a period of years to possibly escape, and at one point, Rachel sings a song of remembrance. Van Etten also appeared in episode six of the 2017 Twin Peaks series on Showtime, in which she performed the song “Tarifa” from her album Are We There.

Van Etten made her feature film debut with a supporting role in the 2020 film Never Rarely Sometimes Always directed by Eliza Hittman, for which she also wrote and performed the original track "Staring at a Mountain".

Van Etten also appeared in the 2021 film How It Ends as Jet. The film featured two new songs by Van Etten, "How Much I Loved You" and "Till We Meet Again".

In 2026, she is a guest star from the children's television in Yo Gabba Gabbaland in Season 2.

== Personal life ==
Van Etten had her first child, a son, in 2017 with husband Zeke Hutchins. Hutchins used to be her drummer and then became her manager. After living in New York City for 15 years, she moved with her family to Los Angeles in September 2019.

== Discography ==
=== Studio albums ===
List of albums, with selected chart positions
Title	Album details	Peak chart positions									
Title	Album details	US	BEL Fl.	BEL Wa.	FRA	GER	NLD	NZ	POR	SWI	UK
Because I Was in Love	Released: May 26, 2009; Label: Language of Stone	—	—	—	—	—	—	—	—	—	—
Epic	Released: September 21, 2010; Label: Ba Da Bing	—	—	—	—	—	—	—	—	—	—
Tramp	Released: February 7, 2012; Label: Jagjaguwar	75	—	—	—	—	—	—	—	—	— (Note: Tramp did not enter the Official Albums Chart, but it peaked at number 19 on the Official Independent Albums Chart.)
Are We There	Released: May 27, 2014; Label: Jagjaguwar	25	123	164	—	—	—	33	—	—	27
Remind Me Tomorrow	Released: January 18, 2019; Label: Jagjaguwar	94	49	131	134	—	88	—	10	39	30
We've Been Going About This All Wrong	Released: May 6, 2022; Label: Jagjaguwar	— (Note: Charted at No. 10 on the Top Album Sales chart.)	102	169	—	52	—	22	26	88	28
Sharon Van Etten & the Attachment Theory	Released: February 7, 2025; Label: Jagjaguwar	— (Note: Charted at No. 11 on the Top Album Sales chart.)	69	—	—	—	—	28	—	43	75
"—" denotes a recording that did not chart or was not released in that territory.

=== EPs ===
- I Don't Want to Let You Down (2015)

=== Singles ===
- "Like I Used To" (with Angel Olsen, 2021)

=== Other contributions ===
- Lent her voice to the Corona "Find Your Beach" campaign, covering Irving Berlin's "Blue Skies"
- April 2009: "Coming Home", written by Jeremy Joyce, for the feature film Woman's Prison (vocals and guitar)
- August 2009: "Kettering", "Thirteen", "Two", and "Shiva" on Hospice by the Antlers (vocals)
- 2010: Van Etten contributes vocals to two tracks on Beirut's third studio album The Rip Tide
- March 2011: "Think You Can Wait" by the National, from the soundtrack to the film Win Win (backing vocals)
- December 2012: A cover of Irving Berlin's "What'll I Do" was recorded with Vince Giordano and the Nighthawks for the season 3 finale of Boardwalk Empire, "Margate Sands"
- December 2012: "Prisoners", with J Mascis, on The Music Is You: A Tribute to John Denver
- November 2013: "Serpents" by Van Etten featured in The Walking Dead season 4, episode 4.
- January 20, 2014: Writing and performing in the film Song One, starring Anne Hathaway
- February 2014: Producing, recording, and performing a cover of the Flaming Lips' "Do You Realize??" for the Amazon children's TV show Gortimer Gibbon's Life on Normal Street
- April 2015: Featured on the song "Sunshine on My Back" by the National, from the Trouble Will Find Me recording sessions
- July 2015: End credit songwriting for the film Tig
- May 2016: Appeared on the Grateful Dead tribute album Day of the Dead, singing "To Lay Me Down", credited to Perfume Genius, Sharon Van Etten & Friends
- September 2016: Scored the Katherine Dieckmann film Strange Weather, which starred Holly Hunter and appeared at the Toronto International Film Festival. The Hollywood Reporter's Jon Frosch praised Van Etten's contributions to the film: "The authentic-feeling Southern ambience, enhanced by Sharon Van Etten's low-key, country-inflected score, is one of the film's most potent assets."
- December 2016: Featured in an acting role as Rachel in The OA, which debuted on Netflix on December 16, 2016
- 2017: Her cover version of "The End of the World" is featured as the lead single of Resistance Radio: The Man in the High Castle Album, a cover album produced by Danger Mouse and Sam Cohen as the companion album of the TV series' reimagining of 60's sound.
- May 2019: Featured on the song "The Pull of You" by the National, from the studio album I Am Easy to Find.
- June 2019: Performed at the Glastonbury Festival.
- September 2019: Covered Irving Berlin's song "Let's Face the Music and Dance" on Jeff Goldblum's I Shouldn't Be Telling You This.
- 2020: Featured on the opening track "Lemon" off of Local Natives EP, Sour Lemon.
- 2020: Featured on the title track "Impossible Weight" by Deep Sea Diver – No. 29 Adult Alternative Songs
- 2021: Featured on "Sad Mezcalita" by Xiu Xiu, the opener on their studio album Oh No.
- 2021: Featured on the track "Nest" off of Jomoro's studio album Blue Marble Sky.
- 2022: Featured on the Superchunk song "If You're Not Dark" from the studio album Wild Loneliness
- 2024: Featured on the King Hannah songs "Big Swimmer" and "This Wasn't Intentional" from the studio album Big Swimmer
- 2025: Featured on the Spiritual Cramp song "You've Got My Number" from the studio album Rude.

== Awards and nominations ==
Year	Association	Category	Nominated work	Result	Ref
2019	AIM Independent Music Awards	Best Independent Track	"Seventeen"	Nominated	
2020	Libera Awards	Best Alternative Rock Album	Remind Me Tomorrow	Nominated	
2022	Libera Awards	Video of the Year	"Like I Used To"	Nominated	
