= Tripper =

Tripper may refer to:

== Film and television ==
- Jack Tripper, a main character in the American sitcoms Three's Company and Three's a Crowd
- Tripper Harrison, the character portrayed by Bill Murray in the film Meatballs
- The Tripper, a 2006 film

== Music ==
- Tripper (Efterklang album), 2004
- Tripper (Fruit Bats album), 2011
- Tripper (Hella album), 2011

== Other uses ==
- A train stop safety device in railway signaling
- Tripper (chess), a fairy chess piece
