= We've Been Going About This All Wrong =

Studio album by Sharon Van Etten
- Released: May 6, 2022
- Genre: Indie rock
- Length: 39:20
- Label: Jagjaguwar
- Producers: Sharon Van Etten; Daniel Knowles

Sharon Van Etten chronology
Remind Me Tomorrow (2019)	We've Been Going About This All Wrong (2022)	Sharon Van Etten & The Attachment Theory (2025)

Singles from We've Been Going About This All Wrong
- 1. "Porta" Released: February 8, 2022; 2. "Used to It" Released: March 1, 2022; 3. "Mistakes" Released: May 9, 2022; 4. "Headspace" Released: July 7, 2022; 5. "Never Gonna Change" Released: October 6, 2022; 6. "When I Die" Released: November 11, 2022

We've Been Going About This All Wrong is the sixth studio album by American singer-songwriter Sharon Van Etten, released on May 6, 2022, by Jagjaguwar. Van Etten wrote the whole album herself, and produced it with Daniel Knowles. The indie rock album was preceded by four singles. It was critically acclaimed and appeared on several year-end lists, and charted in several countries. A deluxe version of the album was released on November 11, with two more singles ahead of it.

== Release ==
We've Been Going About This All Wrong was released on May 6, 2022, by Jagjaguwar. Four singles were released prior to the album's release. "Mistakes", which was released May 9, 2022; and "Headspace", which was released July 7; were both included on the original album. "Porta", released February 8; and "Used to It", released March 1; were originally released as standalone singles before being announced as part of the deluxe edition on October 6. "Never Gonna Change" was released as a single the same day as the deluxe announcement, and "When I Die" released the same day as the deluxe album's release on November 11.

Music videos were released for the first four singles. The video for "Mistakes" shows Van Etten wandering around Brooklyn, meeting friends and dancing in the street. The "Porta" video depicts Van Etten practicing pilates and was inspired by Van Etten's friendship with North Carolina pilates instructor Stella Cook. The "Headspace" video was directed by Ashley Connor and depicts Van Etten taking cellphones away from a couple portrayed by dancers Coco Karol and Miguel Angel Guzmán and encouraging them to embrace each other. The video for "Used to It" features Van Etten dancing with choreographer Hayden J. Frederick, and was directed by Van Etten's musical director and bandmate Charley Damski.

The album is named after a line of dialogue in the 1993 movie The Sandlot, a movie Van Etten says she has watched "probably ... 100 times" with her son.

== Reception ==
We've Been Going About This All Wrong ratings
Aggregate scores
Source	Rating
AnyDecentMusic?	7.7/10
Metacritic	80/100
Review scores
Source	Rating
AllMusic	4/5 stars
Exclaim!	8/10
The Guardian	3/5 stars
The Line of Best Fit	7/10
NME	3/5 stars
Paste	8.4/10
Pitchfork	7.8/10
PopMatters	8/10
Rolling Stone	3.5/5 stars
Under the Radar	8/10 stars

According to the review aggregator Metacritic, We've Been Going About This All Wrong received "generally favorable reviews" based on a weighted average score of 80 out of 100 from 19 critic scores.

=== Year-end lists ===
We've Been Going About This All Wrong on year-end lists
Publication	#	Ref.
BrooklynVegan	39	
Consequence of Sound	47	
Exclaim!	43	
Mondo Sonoro	45	
Paste	46	
PopMatters	61	
Sound Opinions (Jim DeRogatis)	17	
Sound Opinions (Greg Kot)	2	
Uncut	19	
Under the Radar	8	

== Track listing ==
All tracks are written by Sharon Van Etten.

We've Been Going About This All Wrong track listing
No.	Title	Length
1.	"Darkness Fades"	4:34
2.	"Home to Me"	3:39
3.	"I'll Try"	3:08
4.	"Anything"	2:38
5.	"Born"	5:02
6.	"Headspace"	4:26
7.	"Come Back"	4:30
8.	"Darkish"	4:05
9.	"Mistakes"	3:59
10.	"Far Away"	3:19
Total length:		39:20

We've Been Going About This All Wrong (Deluxe Edition) track listing
No.	Title	Length
11.	"Never Gonna Change"	3:39
12.	"Porta"	3:26
13.	"Used to It"	4:31
14.	"When I Die"	4:45
Total length:		55:40

== Personnel ==
=== Musicians ===
- Sharon Van Etten – vocals, keyboards (3, 5–7, 9, 10), guitar (1, 5, 8), drums (2–5), synthesizer (1, 2), tambourine (1, 4), piano (2, 5), organ (5, 7)
- Jorge Balbi – drums (1–3, 5–7, 9, 10), percussion (6)
- Charley Damski – synthesizer (1–3, 5–7, 9, 10), guitar (3–6, 9, 10), glockenspiel (1)
- Devra Hoff – guitar (1–7, 9, 10)
- Jay Bellerose – drums (2, 5, 7)
- Benji Lysaght – guitar (2, 7)
- Zachary Dawes – guitar (2, 5)
- Daniel Knowles – bass (1), percussion (5)
- Owen Pallett – strings (5)
- Dave Palmer – piano (7)

=== Technical ===
- Sharon Van Etten – recording engineer (2–7, 9, 10)
- Daniel Knowles – recording engineer (1–3, 5–10), programming (1, 5)
- Joe LaPorta – mastering engineer
- Beatriz Artola – mixing engineer
- Mike Piersante – recording engineer (2, 5, 7)
- Jorge Balbi – programming (6, 9)

== Charts ==
Chart performance for We've Been Going About This All Wrong
Chart (2022)	Peak position
Australian Albums (ARIA)	48
Belgian Albums (Ultratop Flanders)	102
Belgian Albums (Ultratop Wallonia)	169
German Albums (Offizielle Top 100)	52
New Zealand Albums (RMNZ)	22
Portuguese Albums (AFP)	26
Scottish Albums (Official Charts)	7
Swiss Albums (Schweizer Hitparade)	88
UK Albums (Official Charts)	28
US Folk Albums (Billboard)	5
US Top Album Sales (Billboard)	10
US Top Tastemaker Albums (Billboard)	3
US Vinyl Albums (Billboard)	7
