= Sharon Van Etten & the Attachment Theory =

Studio album by Sharon Van Etten
- Released: February 7, 2025
- Genre: Rock
- Length: 45:50
- Label: Jagjaguwar
- Producer: Sharon Van Etten & the Attachment Theory; Marta Salogni; Josh Block

Sharon Van Etten chronology
We've Been Going About This All Wrong (2022)	Sharon Van Etten & the Attachment Theory (2025)

Singles from Sharon Van Etten & the Attachment Theory
- 1. "Afterlife" Released: October 23, 2024; 2. "Southern Life (What It Must Be Like)" Released: December 4, 2024; 3. "Trouble" Released: January 16, 2025

Sharon Van Etten & the Attachment Theory is the seventh studio album by American singer-songwriter Sharon Van Etten, and her first album with her group the Attachment Theory. It was released through Jagjaguwar on February 7, 2025, and was met with positive critical reception.

== Composition and style ==
Sharon Van Etten & the Attachment Theory is a rock album. The Independent wrote that some of the material was haunting and vocally, "her voice descend[ed] in Siouxsie Sioux swoops on the chorus of “Southern Life (What It Must Be Like)”".

== Release and reception ==
Professional ratings
Aggregate scores
Source	Rating
AnyDecentMusic?	7.9/10
Metacritic	83/100
Review scores
Source	Rating
AllMusic	3.5/5 stars
DIY	5/5 stars
The Guardian	4/5 stars
The Independent	5/5 stars
The Line of Best Fit	7/10
Paste	8.0/10
Pitchfork	7.8/10
PopMatters	8/10
Rolling Stone	4/5 stars
Under the Radar	8.5/10

Sharon Van Etten & the Attachment Theory was released on February 7, 2025, through Jagjaguwar. It is Van Etten's seventh album, and follows We've Been Going About This All Wrong (2022).

According to the review aggregator Metacritic, Sharon Van Etten & The Attachment Theory received "universal acclaim" based on a weighted average score of 83 out of 100 from 20 critic scores. John Amen of No Depression wrote that the album "captures [the] band at its most expressive and [Van Etten] at her most flexible, alternately immersed in her experience and bequeathing wisdom from a detached perspective". He concluded, "There may still be demons dancing around or even inside Van Etten, but they no longer call the shots".

== Track listing ==
All tracks are written by Sharon Van Etten, the Attachment Theory (Devra Hoff, Jorge Castellano, Kristina Lieberson) and Charles Damski, except for "Afterlife" and "Idiot Box", solely written by Van Etten and the Attachment Theory, and "I Can't Imagine (Why You Feel This Way)", written with Daniel Knowles.

Sharon Van Etten & the Attachment Theory track listing
No.	Title	Length
1.	"Live Forever"	5:39
2.	"Afterlife"	4:08
3.	"Idiot Box"	4:10
4.	"Trouble"	5:00
5.	"Indio"	2:47
6.	"I Can't Imagine (Why You Feel This Way)"	3:06
7.	"Somethin' Ain't Right"	4:24
8.	"Southern Life (What It Must Be Like)"	3:48
9.	"Fading Beauty"	6:14
10.	"I Want You Here"	6:29
Total length:		45:50

== Personnel ==
=== Sharon Van Etten & the Attachment Theory ===
- Sharon Van Etten – vocals, production (all tracks); vocoder (tracks 1, 2, 4, 10), guitar (3, 9)
- Jorge Balbi – drums, production (all tracks), vibraphone (track 2)
- Devra Hoff – production (all tracks), bass (tracks 1–4, 6–10); guitar, synthesizer (5); vocals (7)
- Teeny Lieberson – production (all tracks), vocals (tracks 1–6, 8–10), synthesizer (1–4, 6–10), programming (1, 2), piano (4, 9), guitar (5)

=== Additional contributors ===
- Marta Salogni – production, mixing, programming
- Josh Block – production (tracks 1–3)
- Gili Portal – mixing, engineering
- Heba Kadry – mastering
- Balazs Altsach – engineering
- Chiara Ferracuti – engineering
- James Poucher – engineering
- Luke Pickering – engineering
- Alex Reeve – guitar (all tracks), synthesizer (track 2), vocals (3)
- Charley Damski – synthesizer (tracks 1, 8)
- Croissant Man – drums (track 3)
- Daniel Knowles – recording (tracks 6, 8)

== Charts ==
Chart performance for Sharon Van Etten & the Attachment Theory
Chart (2025)	Peak position
Australian Vinyl Albums (ARIA)	10
Belgian Albums (Ultratop Flanders)	69
Irish Independent Albums (IRMA)	16
New Zealand Albums (RMNZ)	28
Scottish Albums (OCC)	9
Swiss Albums (Schweizer Hitparade)	43
UK Albums (OCC)	75
UK Independent Albums (OCC)	2
US Top Album Sales (Billboard)	11
US Vinyl Albums (Billboard)	7
US Folk Albums (Billboard)	15
