= King Hannah =

British indie rock pop duo

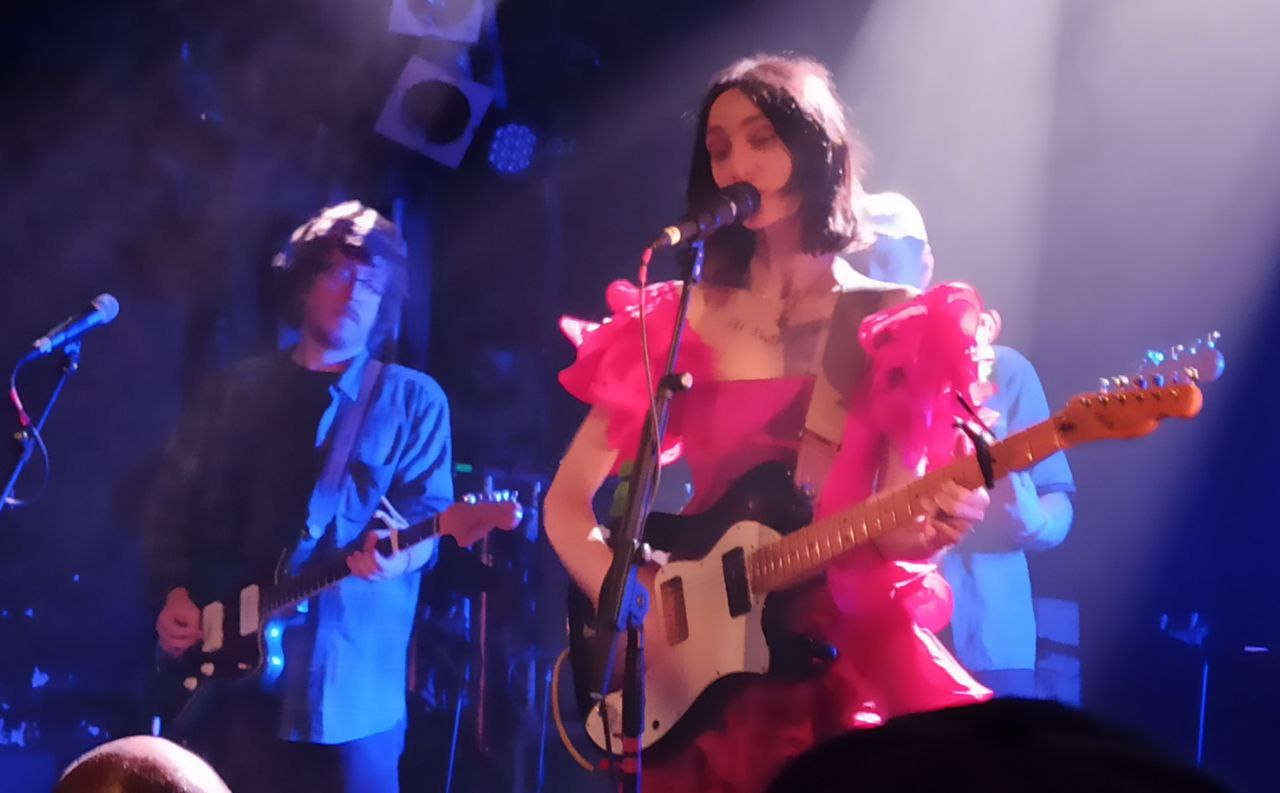
- King Hannah at music club Knust, Hamburg, June 2025

Background information
- Origin: Liverpool, U.K.
- Genres: Indie pop; alternative rock
- Years active: 2020–present
- Label: City Slang
- Members: Hannah Merrick; Craig Whittle
- Website: www.kinghannah.com

King Hannah is an English duo from Liverpool consisting of Hannah Merrick and Craig Whittle. The duo have released two full-length albums. Their first album, I'm Not Sorry, I Was Just Being Me, was released in 2022 via City Slang. In 2024, King Hannah released their second full-length album, titled Big Swimmer, also via City Slang.

== Discography ==
=== Studio albums ===
- I'm Not Sorry, I Was Just Being Me (City Slang, 2022)
- Big Swimmer (City Slang, 2024)

=== Extended plays ===
- Tell Me Your Mind and I'll Tell You Mine (City Slang, 2020)

=== Singles ===
- "A Well-Made Woman" (2021)
- "State Trooper" (2021)
- "Like a Prayer" (2023)
- "Blue Christmas" (2024)
- "Leftovers" (2025)

=== Music videos ===
Title	Year	Album	Director(s)
"Meal Deal (Official Video)"	2020	Tell Me Your Mind and I'll Tell You Mine	Craig Whittle
"Big Swimmer (Official Video)"	2024	Big Swimmer	Craig Whittle
"Davey Says (Official Video)"	2024	Big Swimmer	Craig Whittle
"New York, Let's Do Nothing (Official Video)"	2024	Big Swimmer	Craig Whittle
"Leftovers (Official Video)"	2025	–	Craig Whittle
