= Under Giant Trees =

EP by Efterklang
- Released: 2 April 2007
- Genres: Post-rock, electronic, glitch
- Label: The Leaf Label / Rumraket

Efterklang chronology
Tripper (2004)	Under Giant Trees (2007)	Parades (2007)

Professional ratings
Review scores
Source	Rating
The Austin Chronicle	3/5 stars

Under Giant Trees is a five-track EP by the Danish band Efterklang. It was released in limited and numbered editions of 4500 copies on CD and 1200 copies on white 12" vinyl records.

== Track listing ==
1. "Falling Horses" – 7:12
2. "Himmelbjerget" – 7:36 (Danish for "heaven hill")
3. "Hands Playing Butterfly" – 4:31
4. "Towards the Bare Hill" – 3:10
5. "Jojo" – 6:52
