= I'm Not Sorry, I Was Just Being Me =

Studio album by King Hannah
- Released: 25 February 2022
- Length: 45:46
- Label: City Slang
- Producers: Ted White; Craig Whittle

King Hannah chronology
Tell Me Your Mind and I'll Tell You Mine (2020)	I'm Not Sorry, I Was Just Being Me (2022)	Big Swimmer (2024)

Singles from I'm Not Sorry, I Was Just Being Me
- 1. "A Well-Made Woman" Released: 22 September 2021

I'm Not Sorry, I Was Just Being Me is the debut studio album by King Hannah, an English music duo of Hannah Merrick and Craig Whittle. It was released on 25 February 2022 through City Slang. It received generally favorable reviews from critics.

== Background ==
Hannah Merrick and Craig Whittle formed King Hannah in 2017. The duo's debut EP, Tell Me Your Mind and I'll Tell You Mine, was released in 2020. I'm Not Sorry, I Was Just Being Me is the duo's debut studio album. It was released on 25 February 2022 through City Slang. Music videos were released for "A Well-Made Woman", "All Being Fine", "Big Big Baby", and "It's Me and You, Kid".

== Critical reception ==
Professional ratings
Aggregate scores
Source	Rating
Metacritic	80/100
Review scores
Source	Rating
DIY	4/5 stars
Hot Press	7/10
Mojo	4/5 stars
Pitchfork	7.4/10
PopMatters	7/10
Record Collector	3/5 stars
Uncut	8/10

According to the review aggregator Metacritic, I'm Not Sorry, I Was Just Being Me received "generally favorable reviews" based on a weighted average score of 80 out of 100 from 5 critic scores.

Elvis Thirlwell of DIY described the album as "a narcotic, seductive adventure of squelchy Mazzy Star psych-blues, Portishead-ing trip hop and rainy-day folkishness." John Amen of PopMatters stated, "On I'm Not Sorry, I Was Just Being Me, Whittle's sonic forays and Merrick's downcast yet sultry vocals make for a charismatic blend." Alexandrea Hopper of Hot Press commented that "Merrick's smouldering vocals – recalling the likes of Fiona Apple and PJ Harvey – blend intuitively with Whittle's languorous guitar." She called the album "an impressively accomplished debut."

=== Accolades ===
Year-end lists for I'm Not Sorry, I Was Just Being Me
Publication	List	Rank	Ref.
BrooklynVegan	Top 50 Albums of 2022	49	
Mondo Sonoro	50 Best International Albums of 2022	12	

== Track listing ==
All tracks are written by Hannah Merrick and Craig Whittle.

I'm Not Sorry, I Was Just Being Me track listing
No.	Title	Length
1.	"A Well-Made Woman"	5:19
2.	"So Much Water So Close to Drone"	0:33
3.	"All Being Fine"	3:29
4.	"Big Big Baby"	3:01
5.	"Ants Crawling on an Apple Stork"	3:12
6.	"The Moods That I Get In"	7:43
7.	"Foolius Caesar"	3:46
8.	"Death of the House Phone"	1:27
9.	"Go-Kart Kid (Hell No!)"	5:42
10.	"I'm Not Sorry, I Was Just Being Me"	4:30
11.	"Berenson"	3:01
12.	"It's Me and You, Kid"	4:03
Total length:		45:46

== Personnel ==
Credits adapted from liner notes.

- Hannah Merrick – vocals (1, 3, 4, 6, 7, 9, 10, 12), acoustic guiar (1, 7, 10, 12)
- Craig Whittle – synthesizer (1, 2, 5, 6, 8, 9, 11, 12), backing vocals (1, 3, 4, 9, 12), electric guitar (1, 3–7, 9–12), acoustic guitar (2–6, 9, 11, 12), piano (3, 5–11), vocals (5, 10), bass guitar (6, 7, 12), co-production
- Ted White – synthesizer (1–9, 11, 12), drum programming (10), production, engineering, mixing
- Olly Gorman – bass guitar (1, 3, 4, 9)
- Jake Lipiec – drums (1, 3, 4, 6, 7, 9, 11, 12), percussion (4)
- Sarah Register – mastering
- Jean Goode – design, layout
- Katie Silvester – photography

== Charts ==
Chart performance for I'm Not Sorry, I Was Just Being Me
Chart (2022)	Peak position
Belgian Albums (Ultratop Flanders)	38
German Albums (Offizielle Top 100)	87
Swiss Albums (Schweizer Hitparade)	93
UK Americana Albums (Official Charts)	8
UK Independent Albums (Official Charts)	25
