= Partners (Peter Broderick album) =

Studio album by Peter Broderick
- Released: August 19, 2016
- Studio: Flora Recording & Playback (Portland, Oregon)
- Length: 40:20
- Label: Erased Tapes
- Producer: Tucker Martine

Peter Broderick chronology
Colours of the Night (2015)	Partners (2016)	Grunewald (2016)

Partners is a studio album by American musician Peter Broderick. It was released on August 19, 2016, through Erased Tapes Records. It received generally favorable reviews from critics.

== Background ==
Partners is inspired in part by John Cage's concept of chance-based compositions. It includes Peter Broderick's renditions of Cage's song "In a Landscape" and Brigid Mae Power's song "Sometimes". It is produced by Tucker Martine, who used effect pedals and computers to manipulate the album's piano-based songs live. Broderick did not listen to any mixes or test pressings. The album was released on August 19, 2016, through Erased Tapes Records.

== Critical reception ==
Professional ratings
Aggregate scores
Source	Rating
Metacritic	79/100
Review scores
Source	Rating
MusicOMH	4/5 stars
Pitchfork	7.6/10
PopMatters	8/10

According to the review aggregator Metacritic, Partners received "generally favorable reviews" based on a weighted average score of 79 out of 100 from 6 critic scores.

Saby Reyes-Kulkarni of Pitchfork stated, "Broderick may sound like a lovestruck stoner fresh out of Asian philosophy class in his spoken-word album intro, but what follows resounds with genuine adult heartache." John Murphy of MusicOMH commented that "It may not be for everyone – Broderick's vocals are mostly silent during Partners, with most of the tracks being built on piano – but it's an often fascinating listen given the circumstances under which it was created."

Ian King of PopMatters described the album as "a contentedly lonely wander." He added, "Among his catalog, it might most easily slot alongside his 2008 album Float, which was revisited and reissued five years later as Float 2013." Elizabeth Aubrey of The Quietus stated, "It will simultaneously disorientate and captivate; it will feel both familiar and unlike anything you've ever heard previously." She added, "It's an album that stretches you emotionally and intellectually and is a great advocate for relinquishing control and taking a chance."

== Track listing ==
All tracks are written by Peter Broderick, except "In a Landscape" by John Cage and "Sometimes" by Brigid Mae Power.

Partners track listing
No.	Title	Length
1.	"Partners"	2:15
2.	"In a Landscape"	10:25
3.	"Carried"	6:20
4.	"Under the Bridge"	4:09
5.	"Conspiraling"	4:54
6.	"Up Niek Mountain"	6:23
7.	"Sometimes"	5:50
Total length:		40:20

== Personnel ==
Credits adapted from liner notes.

- Peter Broderick – piano, voice, front photography
- Tucker Martine – production, processing, recording, mixing
- Justin Chase – session assistance
- Francesco Donadello – mastering
- Torsten Posselt – design
- David Allred – back photography
- Markus Shearer – inside photography

== Charts ==
Chart performance for Partners
Chart (2016)	Peak position
UK Independent Album Breakers (OCC)	19
UK Official Record Store (OCC)	31
