= Altid Sammen =

Studio album by Efterklang
- Released: 20 September 2019
- Length: 43:25
- Label: 4AD (UK & US); Rumraket (Europe)

Efterklang chronology
Leaves: The Colour of Falling (2016)	Altid Sammen (2019)

Professional ratings
Aggregate scores
Source	Rating
AnyDecentMusic?	6.7/10
Metacritic	69/100
Review scores
Source	Rating
The 405	7/10
AllMusic	3.5/5 stars
Clash	7/10
Exclaim!	8/10
The Line of Best Fit	7/10
Loud and Quiet	6/10

Altid Sammen is the fifth studio album by Danish band Efterklang. It was released on 20 September 2019 under 4AD in the UK and US, and their own label Rumraket in Europe.

== Critical reception ==
Altid Sammen was met with "generally favorable" reviews from critics. At Metacritic, which assigns a weighted average rating out of 100 to reviews from mainstream publications, this release received an average score of 69, based on 8 reviews. Aggregator Album of the Year gave the album a 69 out of 100 based on a critical consensus of 8 reviews. AnyDecentMusic? reviewed the release at 6.7 out of 10.

== Track listing ==
Altid Sammen track listing
No.	Title	Length
1.	"Vi er uendelig"	3:56
2.	"Supertanker"	4:46
3.	"Uden ansigt"	4:39
4.	"I dine øjne"	4:57
5.	"Hænder der åbner Sig"	4:05
6.	"Verden Forsvinder"	3:03
7.	"Under broen der ligger Du"	7:33
8.	"Havet løfter Sig"	2:58
9.	"Hold mine Hænder"	7:15

== Release history ==
Region	Date	Format	Label	Catalogue
US & UK	20 September 2020	CD; digital download; streaming; LP	4AD	4AD0172
Europe	20 September 2020	CD; digital download; streaming; LP	Rumraket	RUM032

== Charts ==
Chart performance for Altid Sammen
Chart (2019)	Peak position
UK Independent Albums (OCC)	48
