= Colours of the Night (Peter Broderick album) =

Studio album by Peter Broderick
- Released: April 27, 2015
- Studio: Vom Dach (Luzern, Switzerland)
- Length: 38:11
- Label: Bella Union
- Producer: Timo Keller

Peter Broderick chronology
These Walls of Mine (2012)	Colours of the Night (2015)	Partners (2016)

Colours of the Night is a studio album by American musician Peter Broderick. It was released on April 27, 2015, through Bella Union. It received generally favorable reviews from critics.

== Background ==
Colours of the Night was created during the time Peter Broderick stayed in Lucerne, Switzerland. It features contributions from local musicians. It includes his cover version of Stina Nordenstam's song "Get On with Your Life". The album was released on April 27, 2015, through Bella Union. A music video was released for the song "One Way".

Prior to the album's release, Peter Broderick released an EP, (Colours of the Night) Satellite, on October 13, 2014, through Bella Union. A music video was released for the song "Colours of the Night (Satellite Version)".

== Critical reception ==
Professional ratings
Aggregate scores
Source	Rating
Metacritic	74/100
Review scores
Source	Rating
Clash	8/10
The Line of Best Fit	9/10
Mojo	4/5 stars
MusicOMH	3.5/5 stars
NME	6/10
Uncut	7/10

According to the review aggregator Metacritic, Colours of the Night received "generally favorable reviews" based on a weighted average score of 74 out of 100 from 8 critic scores.

Ray Honeybourne of The Line of Best Fit commented that "Colours of the Night is a beguiling and yet joyously engaging set that brings the best out in Peter Broderick's voice and takes him far beyond his established musical milieu." Ben Hogwood of MusicOMH stated, "Peter Broderick has clearly been in some dark places since we last heard from him, but here he is back on track – and for that we are abundantly grateful." Gareth James of Clash called the album "Broderick's most complete and satisfying release to date."

== Track listing ==
All tracks are written by Peter Broderick, except "Get On with Your Life" by Stina Nordenstam.

Colours of the Night track listing
No.	Title	Length
1.	"Red Earth"	4:02
2.	"The Reconnection"	2:39
3.	"Colours of the Night"	4:38
4.	"Get On with Your Life"	3:23
5.	"If I Sinned"	3:42
6.	"Our Best"	6:35
7.	"One Way"	2:19
8.	"On Time"	4:35
9.	"More and More"	4:20
10.	"Rotebode"	1:58
Total length:		38:11

== Personnel ==
Credits adapted from liner notes.

- Peter Broderick – vocals, guitar, synthesizer, violin, piano, filed recordings
- Roland Wäspe – lead guitar
- Nick Furrer – bass guitar
- Mario Hänni – drums, percussion
- Joan Seiler – vocals (1)
- Ursina Giger – vocals (2, 3, 7)
- Aurel Nowak – trumpet (3, 6, 9), chorus (9)
- Till Ostendarp – trombone (3, 6, 9), chorus (9)
- Gregor Frei – tenor saxophone (3, 6, 9), chorus (9)
- Nick Mäder – bass clarinet (3, 6, 9), chorus (9)
- Karen Steffen – vocals (6)
- Timo Keller – production, recording, mixing
- Rob Viso – mastering
- Bijan Berahimi – design
- Markus Shearer – cover photography
- Silvio Zeder – inside photography

== Charts ==
Chart performance for Colours of the Night
Chart (2015)	Peak position
UK Official Record Store (OCC)	36
