= Like I Used To (Sharon Van Etten and Angel Olsen song) =

2021 song by Sharon Van Etten and Angel Olsen

Single by Sharon Van Etten and Angel Olsen
- Released: May 20, 2021
- Genre: Heartland rock
- Length: 4:23
- Label: Jagjaguwar
- Songwriters: Sharon Van Etten; Angel Olsen
- Producer: John Congleton

Sharon Van Etten singles chronology
"Some Things Last a Long Time" (2021)	"Like I Used To" (2021)	"Femme Fatale" (2021)

Angel Olsen singles chronology
"Alive and Dying (Waving, Smiling)" (2021)	"Like I Used To" (2021)	"Gloria" (2021)

Music video
- "Like I Used To" on YouTube

"Like I Used To" is a song by American singer-songwriters Sharon Van Etten and Angel Olsen. The song was written by Van Etten and Olsen, and produced by John Congleton. The music video was released on May 20, 2021, which shows Van Etten and Olsen with their hair styled in similar shag haircuts.

== Background ==
About the collaboration, Van Etten said in a press release: "Even though we weren't super close, I always felt supported by Angel and considered her a peer in this weird world of touring. We highway high-fived many times along the way…. I finally got the courage in June of 2020 to reach out to see if she would want to sing together. I got greedy and quickly sent her a track I had been working on."

Olsen added: "I've met with Sharon here and there throughout the years and have always felt too shy to ask her what she's been up to or working on. The song reminded me immediately of getting back to where I started, before music was expected of me, or much was expected of me, a time that remains pure and real in my heart."

== Critical reception ==
Pitchfork's Sam Sodomsky gave the song a "Best New Track" designation, saying, "The whole thing feels momentous, predestined to be a crowd-pleasing set closer, and the lyrics add to its casual grandeur." Under the Radar placed the song at number one in their list of 10 Best Songs of the Week.

== Music video ==
The music video for the song was directed by Kimberly Stuckwisch, which was filmed at locations around Los Angeles and Joshua Tree.

== Charts ==
Chart performance for "Like I Used To"
Chart (2021)	Peak position
US Adult Alternative Airplay (Billboard)	26
