= Our Broken Garden =

Danish dream pop band

- Origin: Denmark
- Genres: Dream pop
- Years active: 2008–2012
- Label: Bella Union
- Members: Anna Brønsted, with: Søren Bigum; Moogie Johnson; Nis Tyrrestrup; Poul Terkildsen

Our Broken Garden are a Danish dream pop group, essentially the solo project of Efterklang touring keyboard player Anna Brønsted.

== History ==
The project has also featured guitarist/keyboardist Søren Bigum, bassists Moogie Johnson and Nis Tyrrestrup, and drummer Poul Terkildsen. After Brønsted posted her music on MySpace, it was found by Simon Raymonde, who subsequently signed Our Broken Garden to his Bella Union label. The first release was The Lost Sailor EP in April 2008, with debut album When Your Blackening Shows following five months later. A second album, Golden Sea, was released in 2010, receiving positive reviews from the likes of the BBC, NME (with Simon Jay Catling calling it "the most deliciously constructed orchestral-tinged dream-pop since Sigur Rós"), The Independent, and AllMusic. Over a decade after the last record in August 2023, the third album, Blind, was released, described by Trev Elkin as "a delicate flame of an album whose warmth and light reaches into the darkest corners."

== Musical style ==
The BBC's Mark Beaumont, reviewing Golden Sea, described Our Broken Garden as music "for goths to have sex to", and Brønsted as "Denmark's answer to Hope Sandoval at a Viking sea burial". Chris Roberts of The Quietus described them as "like a more precious All About Eve". GAFFA described their music as "sweet, rounded and melancholic".

== Discography ==
=== Albums ===
- When Your Blackening Shows (2008), Bella Union
- Golden Sea (2010), Bella Union
- Blind (2023), Bella Union

=== EPs ===
- Lost Sailor (2008)

=== Singles ===
- "Garden Grow" (2010), Bella Union
