= Epic (Sharon Van Etten album) =

Studio album by Sharon Van Etten
- Released: September 21, 2010
- Studio: Miner Street Recordings (Philadelphia, Pennsylvania)
- Genre: Indie rock, folk, indie folk, folk rock
- Length: 32:08
- Label: Ba Da Bing
- Producer: Brian McTear

Sharon Van Etten chronology
Because I Was in Love (2009)	Epic (2010)	Tramp (2012)

Singles from Epic
- 1. "One Day" Released: 2010

Professional ratings
Aggregate scores
Source	Rating
AnyDecentMusic?	7.2/10
Metacritic	82/100
Review scores
Source	Rating
AllMusic	4/5 stars
The A.V. Club	B+
DIY	8/10
Drowned in Sound	8/10
Mojo	4/5 stars
Now	4/5 stars
Pitchfork	7.8/10
PopMatters	8/10
Spin	8/10
Under the Radar	8/10

Epic is the second studio album by American singer–songwriter Sharon Van Etten. The album was released on September 21, 2010.

Epic was recorded and mixed over 11 days in Philadelphia between May 28, 2010, and June 6, 2010, at Miner Street Recordings with producer Brian McTear. The album features guest performances by singers Cat Martino and Meg Baird; Jessica Larrabee and Andy LaPlant of the band She Keeps Bees; and David Hartley of The War on Drugs and the band Nightlands.

The final song on the album, "Love More" was originally recorded as part of the Shaking Through documentary video series produced by Weathervane Music.

In 2021, a tenth-anniversary version of the album was released. The release included a track-by-track cover album by various artists.

== Track listing ==
All songs written by Sharon Van Etten.

No.	Title	Length
1.	"A Crime"	3:13
2.	"Peace Signs"	2:53
3.	"Save Yourself"	4:59
4.	"Dsharpg"	6:01
5.	"Don't Do It"	5:05
6.	"One Day"	4:43
7.	"Love More"	5:14
