= Horse Feathers (band) =

American indie folk band

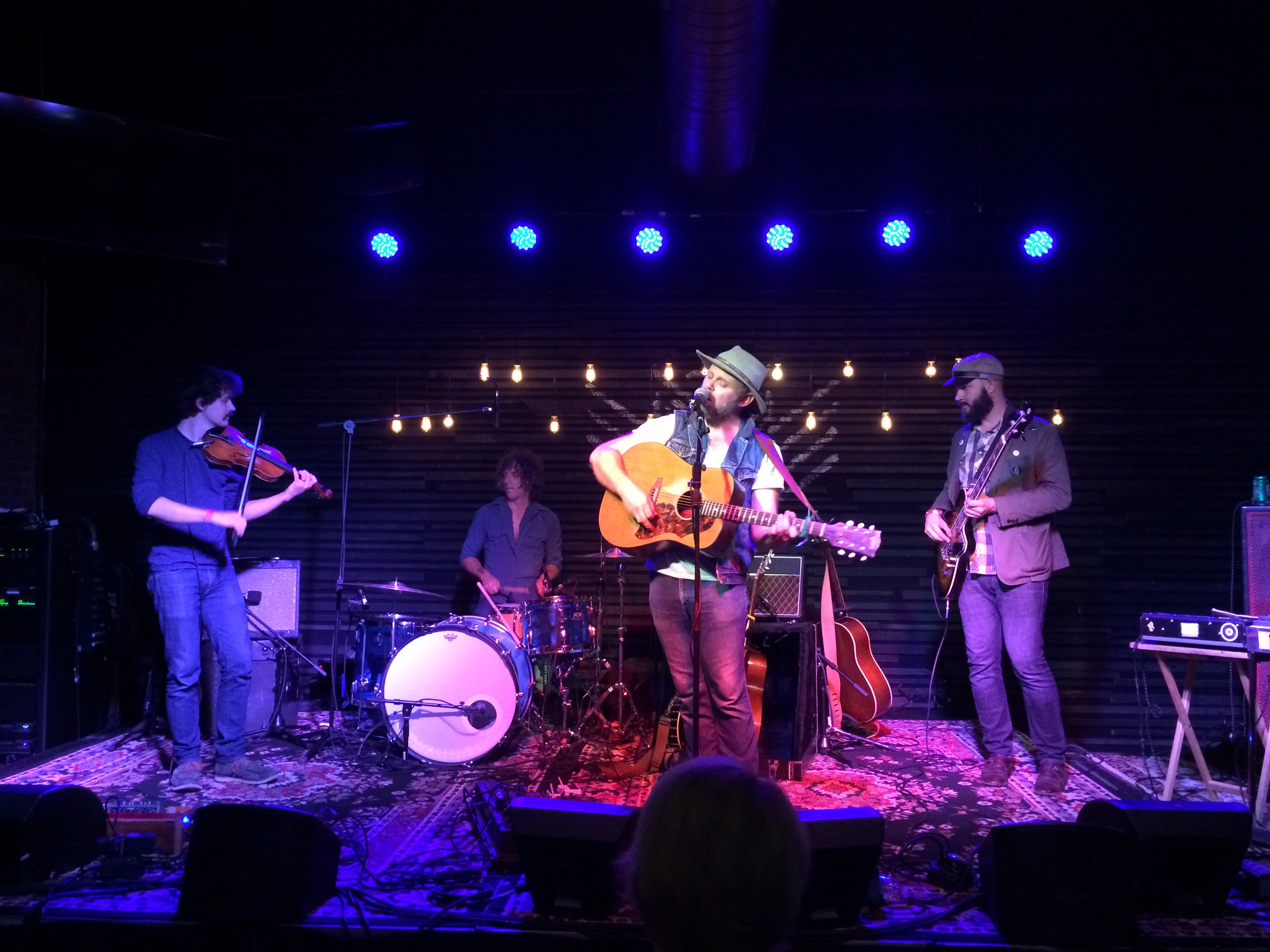
- Horse Feathers live in 2018 on the 'Appreciation' tour.

Background information
- Origin: Portland, Oregon, United States
- Genres: Indie folk, neofolk
- Years active: 2004–present
- Label: Kill Rock Stars
- Members: Justin Ringle; Nathan Crockett; J. Tom Hnatow; Robby Cosenza
- Past members: Dustin Dybvig; Brad Parsons; Mayhaw Hoons; Peter Broderick; Heather Broderick; Catherine Odell; Sam Cooper

Horse Feathers is an American indie folk band from Portland, Oregon, United States.

== Biography ==
After fronting several rock bands in his native Idaho, singer/songwriter Justin Ringle moved to Portland, Oregon in 2004 and began focusing on acoustic music, playing open mics regularly under the moniker Horse Feathers. In 2005, multi-instrumentalist Peter Broderick heard a couple of Ringle's demos and offered to help flesh them out. In February 2006 the duo went into Skyler Norwood's Miracle Lake studios and recorded their debut album, Words Are Dead, which was released that September on Portland label, Lucky Madison. Later that year, Peter's sister Heather Broderick joined the group on cello and by 2007, Horse Feathers began featuring a rotating cast of instrumentalists backing Ringle's guitar and vocals.

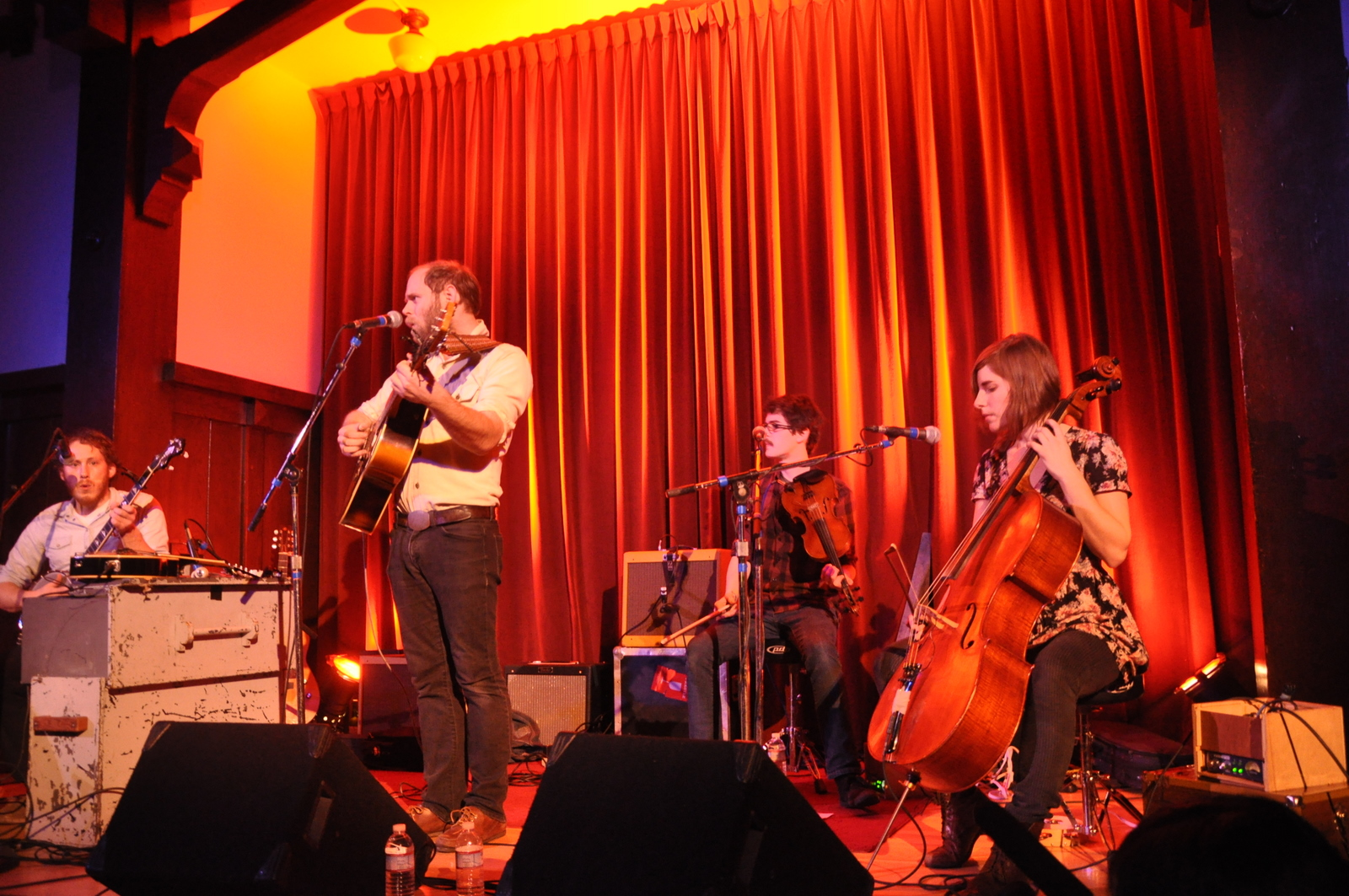
Horse Feathers live in 2010.

Ringle and the Brodericks returned to Miracle Lake studios in the fall and winter of 2007 and recorded House With No Home, which was released on Kill Rock Stars in the spring of 2008. Around that time, Peter Broderick left the country to pursue music in Europe, and Nathan Crockett was enlisted to cover violin duties. Several months later, Heather Broderick also left the group to pursue other musical projects and cellist Catherine Odell came on board. The current line-up was rounded out at the beginning of 2009 when Sam Cooper joined as a multi-instrumentalist. As a four piece, the group has been touring extensively and released Thistled Spring on Kill Rock Stars, on April 20, 2010.

The band's fourth album, Cynic's New Year, was released in 2012. The album charted on the Billboard charts even though it sold fewer copies than their previous record. On October 12, 2014, NPR debuted Horse Feathers' fifth album entitled So It Is with Us which was released on October 21, 2014 on Kill Rock Stars on CD, vinyl, and digital download. The album was recorded in a rural Oregon barn following a hiatus from Ringle, and is unique in that it features both drums and bass. On March 2, 2018, NPR debuted Horse Feathers' new single "Without Applause", taken from the band's upcoming sixth album, 'Appreciation', which was released on May 4, 2018 via Kill Rock Stars and featured the new rhythm section of J. Tom Hnatow and Robby Cosenza.

== Discography ==
=== Albums ===
- Words Are Dead (LP, Lucky Madison, 09/26/2006)
- House with No Home (CD/LP, Kill Rock Stars, 09/8/2008)
- Thistled Spring (CD/LP, Kill Rock Stars, 04/20/2010)
- Cynic's New Year (CD/LP, Kill Rock Stars, 04/17/2012)
- So It Is with Us (CD, Kill Rock Stars, 10/21/2014)
- Appreciation (CD, Kill Rock Stars, 05/4/2018)

=== Singles ===
- Road to Ruin (7", Regional Hits, 2008)
- Cascades (7", Kill Rock Stars, 2009)
- Drain You/Bonnet of Briars (7", Kill Rock Stars, 2010)
- Fit Against the Country (Kill Rock Stars, 2012)
- Violently Wild (Kill Rock Stars, 2014)
- Without Applause (Kill Rock Stars, 2018)

=== Other appearances ===
- You Be My Heart (LP, Devon Reed, 2013)
