= Piramida (album) =

Studio album by Efterklang
- Released: 22 September 2012
- Genre: Indie pop
- Language: English
- Label: 4AD

Efterklang chronology
Magic Chairs (2010)	Piramida (2012)

Professional ratings
Aggregate scores
Source	Rating
Metacritic	74/100
Review scores
Source	Rating
AllMusic	4/5 stars
Consequence of Sound	D
Drowned in Sound	9/10
The Guardian	3/5 stars
NME	5/10
Now	NNNN
Pitchfork	5.7/10
PopMatters	7/10
The Skinny	4/5 stars
Under the Radar	8/10 stars

Piramida is the fourth studio album from Danish indie rock group Efterklang. It was released on 22 September 2012. The album was their second to be released on 4AD. The album took inspiration from and is named for the abandoned Russian coal-mining settlement on the Norwegian Svalbard archipelago.

== Track listing ==
1. "Hollow Mountain"
2. "Apples"
3. "Sedna"
4. "Told to Be Fine"
5. "The Living Layer"
6. "The Ghost"
7. "Black Summer"
8. "Dreams Today"
9. "Between the Walls"
10. "Monument"

== Charts ==
Chart (2012)	Peak position
Belgian Albums (Ultratop Flanders)	57
Belgian Albums (Ultratop Wallonia)	101
Danish Albums (Hitlisten)	8
Irish Albums (IRMA)	82
UK Albums (OCC)	136
UK Independent Albums (Official Charts)	20
US Heatseekers Albums (Billboard)	17
