= Slaraffenland =

- Origin: Copenhagen, Denmark
- Genres: Folk, jazz fusion, post-rock, pop, chamber pop
- Years active: 2001–present
- Labels: Hometapes, Rumraket
- Members: Mike Taagehøj; Christian Taagehøj; Niklas Antonson; Bjørn Heebøll; Jeppe Skjold
- Website: http://www.slaraffenland.net

Slaraffenland is an experimental pop music band from Copenhagen, Denmark. Their sound is a mixture of many different styles, including post-rock, experimental rock, noise pop, and freeform jazz. They self-released an album and an EP under their own label, "Honningmand Records". Their second album Private Cinema was released in 2007. The band's third studio album, entitled We're on Your Side was released on September 15, 2009.

By the band's own account their name means "The Land of Milk and Honey" in Danish, though the "Land of Cockaigne" is a technically more accurate translation.

== History ==
The band members are from the Scandinavian region, Denmark and Sweden. The band was formed in 2002 but the members have known one another for many years. The twins Mike (Bass, Vocals) and Christian (Guitars, Vocals) met drummer Bjorn in kindergarten when they were all 4 years old. When the three of them moved from the small town Ringsted to Copenhagen, they quickly met Jeppe (Sax, Percussion, Vocals) and the recent newcomer from Sweden; Niklas (Keys, Samplers, Trombone, Vocals) in the circles of the Copenhagen experimental music scene. The five guys decided to make a band with the aesthetics from Impro, Post-rock and jazz served in an edible form. The result is a sound you could characterize as chamber-pop with a lot of influences from all over the world. Slaraffenland joined the American label Hometapes in 2006, making their debut at CMJ Music Marathon that year.

=== Early Releases ===
The band self-released Slaraffenland (2004) and Jinkatawa EP (2005). The self-titled Slaraffenland debut CD was recorded October 2003 at Sauna Recording Studio in Copenhagen, with production from Magnus Groth. It was released in February 2004. The cover was made by graphic designer Paw Nielsen.

Jinkatawa EP was recorded at Fredrik Mellqvist studio(FM Produktion) and Rumraket studio in Copenhagen. Mixed and produced by Mads Brauer and Casper Clausen from Efterklang. The CD was printed in 500 copies on a 3" mini CD. With a hand-made cover decorated with stickers designed by Mette Heide. The inside artwork was made by Mbobo.

Both releases were completely instrumental and featured a more jazz-driven style.

=== Private Cinema ===
The band released their second studio album, Private Cinema in 2007. It was produced and mixed by Petter Samuelsson, with packaging designed by the world-famous Friends With You.

In 2008, the band toured Denmark and United States with fellow friends and collaborators Efterklang and released the EP "Sunshine", which included and covers of Radiohead's Paranoid Android, a-ha's Take On Me and three brand new tracks. It featured artwork by Slaraffenland's own Niklas Antonson, packaged in a custom wallet featuring spot-color printing and a full-color insert.

The album received a very positive review from Pitchfork Media, with the reviewer concluding: "The album as a whole is a brave perambulation, drawing on the acidic thunderstorms and gorgeous lullabies of two great Icelandic exports (Björk on "You Win" and Sigur Rós for aching closer "How Far Would You Go"). In music, it's not often that this borderline overindulgence, where structure and uniformity are all but forgotten, works. But here the members of Slaraffenland showcase their virtuoso skills and shared vision, always modestly."

=== We're On Your Side ===
The band debuted songs from their third album We're on your side at SXSW Music Festival, in March 2009, as part of their own showcase titled "Danish Dynamite". An outdoor party featuring the likes of Efterklang, Murder, and the Choir of Young Believers.

It was recorded with production assistance from Danish producer Fridolin. It was partially funded by a monetary incentive by Danish Arts Council to help local artists continue their work. The album will feature deluxe packaging with the art of Cody Hudson, a Chicago-based proprietor of Struggle Inc.

The single "Meet and Greet" was released on June 15, 2009, as a digital download; and 7" vinyl, on June 22, 2009. It included the titled track and a b-side called "My Bad Ways".

The album received a very positive review from Pitchfork Media, with the reviewer stating: "We're on Your Side, the group's third album, falls on the less rigid end of the chamber-pop spectrum-- downbeat but not dour, reveling in the sweet spot between structure and open-ended art-rock exploration."

== Collaborations ==
In July 2007, American music blog Stereogum invited the band to participate on the tribute album OKX, a celebration of Radiohead's iconic album OK Computer.

In November 2008, a special performance for the Sono Festival in Denmark resulted in Slaraffenklang, a hybrid between the band and Efterklang. It was the first and maybe last concert of the newfound moniker. It featured all twelve members performing covers of their original bands. It was recorded, mixed and mastered by Petter Samuelsson and later released as a free Live EP.

== Discography ==
=== Studio albums ===
- Slaraffenland (2004)
- Private Cinema (2007)
- We're On Your Side (2009)
- Slow Waves (2015)

=== EPs ===
- Jinkatawa (2005)
- Sunshine (2008)

=== Singles ===
- Meet And Greet (2009)
