= Tramp (album) =

Studio album by Sharon Van Etten
- Released: February 7, 2012
- Recorded: Aaron Dessner's garage studio, New York City
- Genre: Indie folk
- Length: 46:19
- Label: Jagjaguwar
- Producer: Aaron Dessner

Sharon Van Etten chronology
Epic (2010)	Tramp (2012)	Are We There (2014)

Singles from Tramp
- 1. "Serpents" Released: February 7, 2012; 2. "Leonard" Released: July 12, 2012; 3. "Give Out" Released: 2012; 4. "Magic Chords" Released: October 10, 2012; 5. "We Are Fine" Released: April 20, 2012

Tramp is the third studio album by American singer–songwriter Sharon Van Etten, released on February 7, 2012.

For the recording, Sharon collaborated with Zach Condon, Wye Oak’s Jenn Wasner, Julianna Barwick, Walkmen's Matt Barrick, Thomas Bartlett, and Aaron Dessner. Dessner also produced the album and provided the studio.

The first track to be released as a single was "Serpents", featuring Aaron and Bryce Dessner, Barwick, Wasner, and Bartlett.

== Reception ==
Professional ratings
Aggregate scores
Source	Rating
AnyDecentMusic?	7.8/10
Metacritic	81/100
Review scores
Source	Rating
AllMusic	3.5/5 stars
The A.V. Club	B+
Los Angeles Times	3/4 stars
Mojo	4/5 stars
NME	9/10
The Observer	4/5 stars
Pitchfork	7.9/10
Q	4/5 stars
Rolling Stone	4/5 stars
Spin	8/10

At Metacritic, which assigns a normalised rating out of 100 to reviews from mainstream critics, Tramp received an average score of 81, based on 31 reviews, indicating "universal acclaim". Reviewer Thom Jurek of AllMusic said that although the album contained "great beauty", Van Etten "skirts the edges of giving us a great album without actually delivering one" and noted that "Tramp doesn't quite fulfill its considerable promise."

Tramp debuted at number 75 on the Billboard 200.

The album was ranked 42nd on Stereogum's list of top 50 albums of 2012.

== Track listing ==
All songs written by Sharon Van Etten.

No.	Title	Length
1.	"Warsaw"	2:29
2.	"Give Out"	4:21
3.	"Serpents"	3:04
4.	"Kevin's"	4:04
5.	"Leonard"	3:50
6.	"In Line"	4:46
7.	"All I Can"	4:56
8.	"We Are Fine"	3:51
9.	"Magic Chords"	3:58
10.	"Ask"	3:24
11.	"I'm Wrong"	3:57
12.	"Joke or a Lie"	4:02

== Musicians ==
- Sharon Van Etten - Vocals (1–12), Guitar (1–7,10–12), Harmonium (5,10), Ukulele (8), Organ (9)
- Matt Barrick - Drums (1,3,5,6,8,9)
- Thomas Bartlett - Keys (3,12), Rhodes (6), Piano (8,10)
- Julianna Barwick - Vocals (4,11)
- Logan Coale - Double Bass (5)
- Zach Condon - Vocals (8,9)
- Aaron Dessner - Guitar (1,2,5,7,10,12), Bass (1,3,4,7,8,10,11), Keys (1,4,7–9,11,12), Drums (2,10), Slide Guitar (3), Electric Guitar (4,8), Drum Machine (4), Piano (5,7,9), Shaker (5), Guitar Feedback (11), Glockenspiel (11), Percussion (11), Orchestration (12)
- Bryce Dessner - Ebo Guitar (3,11), Bowed Guitar (7), Orchestration (7,8,12)
- Bryan Devendorf - Drums (7,10)
- Clarice Jensen - Cello (8,12)
- Doug Keith - Bass (6), Guitar (7)
- Benjamin Lanz - Trombone (7,11)
- Ben Lord - Drums (11)
- Rob Moose - Violin (5,8,12), Orchestration (5), Mandolin (5), Viola (8)
- Jenn Wasner - Vocals (3,6)
