= Springer (EP) =

EP by Efterklang
- Released: May 2003
- Recorded: 2003 in Copenhagen
- Genre: Post-rock, electronic, glitch, dream pop
- Length: 31:43
- Label: Rumraket

Efterklang chronology
Springer (2003)	Tripper (2004)

Springer is the 2003 debut EP by the Danish group Efterklang. They self-released it on their Rumraket label in 2003, employing the do-it-yourself aesthetic by making 500 copies packaged in fake white fur. It was later released worldwide by The Leaf Label in April 2005.

== Track listing ==
1. "Kloy Gyn" – 8:01
2. "Antitech" – 7:21
3. "Redrop" – 4:08
4. "Bright" – 6:01
5. "Filmosonic XL" – 6:12
