= Big Swimmer =

Studio album by King Hannah
- Released: 31 May 2024
- Length: 49:44
- Label: City Slang
- Producer: Ali Chant

King Hannah chronology
I'm Not Sorry, I Was Just Being Me (2022)	Big Swimmer (2024)

Big Swimmer is the second studio album by King Hannah, an English music duo of Hannah Merrick and Craig Whittle. It was released on 31 May 2024 through City Slang. Sharon Van Etten provided guest vocals on the songs "Big Swimmer" and "This Wasn't Intentional". The album received universal acclaim from critics.

== Background ==
Hannah Merrick and Craig Whittle formed King Hannah in 2017. The duo's debut studio album, I'm Not Sorry, I Was Just Being Me, was released in 2022. They then toured across the world, which would become a source of inspiration for their second studio album, Big Swimmer. Ali Chant produced the album. Sharon Van Etten provided guest vocals on the songs "Big Swimmer" and "This Wasn't Intentional". Music videos were released for "Big Swimmer", "Davey Says", and "New York, Let's Do Nothing".

== Critical reception ==
Professional ratings
Aggregate scores
Source	Rating
Metacritic	81/100
Review scores
Source	Rating
AllMusic	4/5 stars
Exclaim!	8/10
The Line of Best Fit	8/10
Pitchfork	6.9/10
PopMatters	8/10
Under the Radar	7.5/10 stars

According to the review aggregator Metacritic, Big Swimmer received "universal acclaim" based on a weighted average score of 81 out of 100 from 8 critic scores.

Marcy Donelson of AllMusic commented that "While Big Swimmer isn't especially hooky or melodic or cathartic, it is mesmerizing, and performed with an actor's command of an audience, a playwright's turn of phrase, and an expert sense of guitar tones -- as well as an enviable, intangible coolness." Patrick Gill of PopMatters stated, "On Big Swimmer, King Hannah take another step forward in their songwriting and even production, which is of higher fidelity than previous records." Andy Von Pip of Under the Radar called the album "a solidification of their oeuvre, brimming with confidence as Whittle's gritty, coruscating guitar riffs perfectly illuminate Merrick's often opaque yet playful poetic lyrics, often delivered with a laconic drawl." He added, "The album boasts a widescreen musical style, executed with flair and panache."

=== Accolades ===
Year-end lists for Big Swimmer
Publication	List	Rank	Ref.
Les Inrockuptibles	100 Best Albums of 2024	24	
Magnet	Top 25 Albums of 2024	20	
Mondo Sonoro	Best International Albums of 2024	9	

== Track listing ==
All tracks are written by Hannah Merrick and Craig Whittle.

Big Swimmer track listing
No.	Title	Length
1.	"Big Swimmer" (featuring Sharon Van Etten)	5:22
2.	"New York, Let's Do Nothing"	3:22
3.	"The Mattress"	4:45
4.	"Milk Boy (I Love You)"	3:53
5.	"Suddenly, Your Hand"	7:19
6.	"Somewhere Near El Paso"	8:21
7.	"Lily Pad"	3:33
8.	"Davey Says"	2:47
9.	"Scully"	1:35
10.	"This Wasn't Intentional" (featuring Sharon Van Etten)	5:00
11.	"John Prine on the Radio"	3:47
Total length:		49:44

== Personnel ==
Credits adapted from liner notes.

- Hannah Merrick – vocals (1–8, 10, 11), synthesizer (3), guitar (3, 5, 10), additional guitar (4)
- Craig Whittle – guitar, vocals (2, 8, 11), synthesizer (2), piano (3, 5, 10, 11), keyboards (5)
- Conor O'Shea – bass guitar, keyboards (1, 10, 11), piano (5)
- Jake Lipiec – drums
- Sharon Van Etten – vocal harmonies (1, 10)
- Ted White – additional synthesizer (3, 7)
- Ali Chant – additional guitar (4, 8), vibraphone (6, 10), production, recording, mixing
- Niklas Lueger – engineering
- Sarah Register – mastering

== Charts ==
Chart performance for Big Swimmer
Chart (2024)	Peak position
Belgian Albums (Ultratop Flanders)	74
German Albums (Offizielle Top 100)	63
Scottish Albums (Official Charts)	92
Swiss Albums (Schweizer Hitparade)	75
UK Album Downloads (Official Charts)	69
UK Americana Albums (Official Charts)	10
UK Independent Albums (Official Charts)	13
