= Magic Chairs =

Studio album by Efterklang
- Released: 22 February 2010
- Recorded: Feedback Recording Studio, Århus; Black Tornado, Copenhagen; STC Studio, Copenhagen; Efterklang's studio, Copenhagen
- Genre: Indie pop
- Length: 43:47
- Language: English
- Label: 4AD (CAD 3X01)
- Producers: Efterklang, Gareth Jones

Efterklang chronology
Parades (2007)	Magic Chairs (2010)	Piramida (2012)

Professional ratings
Aggregate scores
Source	Rating
Metacritic	73/100
Review scores
Source	Rating
AllMusic	3.5/5 stars
BBC	(positive)
Contact Music	(positive)
Drowned in Sound	(8/10)
The Guardian	3/5 stars
MusicOMH	4/5 stars
NME	(7/10)
Pitchfork	(5.9/10)
Sputnikmusic	2.5/5 stars
Strange Glue	(8/10)
Unbored	(6/10)

Magic Chairs is the third studio album from Danish indie rock group Efterklang. The album is the band's first release on their new label 4AD, and was released on 22 February 2010 and a day later in North America. The album was also released on the band's own label, Rumraket, in Scandinavia. The band began recording the album in January 2009 in studios across Copenhagen and Aarhus, and mixed the album with producer Gareth Jones. The first single "Modern Drift" was released as a free MP3 track on 4AD's website on November 19, 2009, and the music video for the song premiered on January 25, 2010.

== Track listing ==
1. "Modern Drift" – 4:53
2. "Alike" – 4:11
3. "I Was Playing Drums" – 5:13
4. "Raincoats" – 4:20
5. "Harmonics" – 4:05
6. "Full Moon" – 3:49
7. "The Soft Beating" – 4:13
8. "Scandinavian Love" – 3:53
9. "Mirror Mirror" – 5:44
10. "Natural Tune" – 3:26

Download-only bonus track

11. "Me Me Me the Brick House" – 5:26

== Singles ==
- "Modern Drift" (January 25, 2010)
  - Music video only
- "I Was Playing Drums" (April 19, 2010)
  - 7" vinyl, 4AD (AD 3X08)
  1. "I Was Playing Drums" (Edit) – 4:07
  2. "Me Me Me the Brick House" – 5:26
- "Raincoats" (August 23, 2010)
  - Digital download, 4AD
  1. "Raincoats" (Edit) – 3:45
  2. "Harmonics" (Covered by Peter Broderick and Nils Frahm) – 4:23

== Credits ==
- Produced by Efterklang.
- Mixed by Gareth Jones.
- Artwork by Hvass&Hannibal.
