= Because I Was in Love =

Studio album by Sharon Van Etten
- Released: May 26, 2009
- Genre: Indie rock, folk
- Length: 44:38
- Label: Language of Stone Records

Sharon Van Etten chronology
Because I Was in Love (2009)	Epic (2010)

Singles from Because I Was in Love
- 1. "Much More Than That" Released: 2007

Because I Was in Love is the debut studio album by American singer–songwriter Sharon Van Etten, released on May 26, 2009 by Language of Stone Records.

== Background ==
A remastered and remixed reissue of the album, now re-titled (it was) because i was in love, was self-released by Van Etten on Bandcamp on November 17, 2017. This included two bonus tracks: I'm Giving Up On You and You Didn't Really Do That, which were previously released together on a single in 2010 through Polyvinyl.

== Critical reception ==
Professional ratings
Review scores
Source	Rating
AllMusic	3.5/5 stars
Pitchfork	7.7/10

With a 7.7 rating Matthew Murphy of Pitchfork wrote "Van Etten keeps the album's arrangements minimal and direct, augmenting her voice and guitar with only the occasional splash of organ, brushed cymbals, or multi-tracked vocal harmonies."

Stephen Thomason of NPR claimed "Van Etten's 2009 debut, because i was in love, doesn't actually sound tentative or insecure. Instead, it functions as a sort of concept album about tentativeness and insecurity — about examining tiny interpersonal details until they become all-encompassing...It captures a sound Sharon Van Etten has since left behind, but it remains radiant, universal and utterly timeless."

Andrew Leahey of AllMusic, gave the album a 3.5/5 rating. Leahey declared "Intimacy reigns supreme on Sharon Van Etten’s debut, which finds the folksinger crooning her melodies over beds of acoustic guitar, keyboard, and overdubbed harmonies...Because I Was in Love isn’t a bare-boned folk album; rather, it’s the sort of record that unfolds its layers with repeated listens, and the arrangements are often gorgeously lush without threatening to overpower Van Etten’s alto."

== Track listing ==
All songs written by Sharon Van Etten.

No.	Title	Length
1.	"I Wish I Knew"	3:47
2.	"Consolation Prize"	4:03
3.	"For You"	2:31
4.	"I Fold"	3:26
5.	"Have You Seen"	3:14
6.	"Tornado"	4:31
7.	"Much More Than That"	4:32
8.	"Same Dream"	3:14
9.	"Keep"	4:59
10.	"It's Not Like"	4:13
11.	"Holding Out"	6:08
