= Peter Broderick =

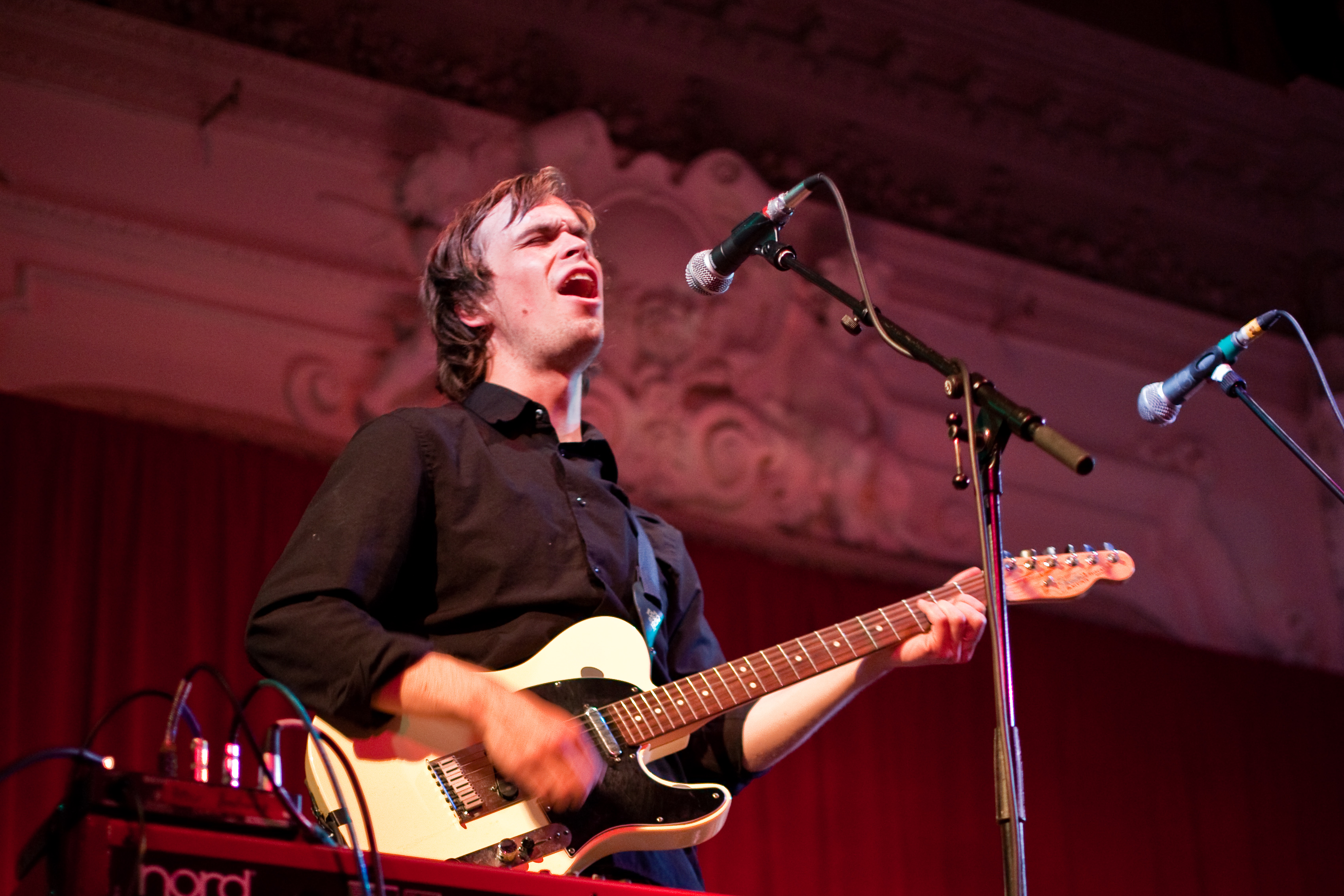
- Peter Broderick in 2009

Background information
- Born: January 20, 1987 (age 39); Searsmont, Maine, US
- Origin: Portland, Oregon, US
- Occupations: Musician; composer
- Years active: 2007–present
- Labels: Bella Union; Erased Tapes; Type; Kning Disk; Hush; Western Vinyl
- Formerly of: Efterklang
- Website: www.peterbroderick.net

Peter Broderick (born January 20, 1987) is an American musician and composer from Carlton, Oregon. He has released solo material under his own name, been a member of Efterklang, and played with several ensembles as a session musician.

== Biography ==
Broderick was born in Searsmont, Maine in 1987 but raised mostly in Carlton, Oregon. He learned a number of musical instruments whilst at school, and went on to become a session musician, playing violin, banjo, musical saw, and mandolin on recordings by M. Ward, Zooey Deschanel, Dolorean, Jeff London and others. He played and toured with numerous groups, including Horse Feathers, Norfolk & Western, Loch Lomond and Laura Gibson.

In mid-2007, Broderick joined the Danish ensemble Efterklang in Copenhagen to join their touring band after the release of their album Parades. After touring, he released a mini album of solo piano music, Docile, on the Swedish label Kning Disk, as well as a 7″, Retreat/Release, his first full-length album of piano and string based compositions, Float, and an orchestral concept album, Music for Falling from Trees, on the US label Western Vinyl and British label Erased Tapes. He released two albums in collaboration with Machinefabriek. He also released solo albums These Walls of Mine (2012), Colours of the Night (2015), Partners (2016), and All Together Again (2017).

He is the brother of Heather Woods Broderick, also a solo artist and Efterklang collaborator. He married Irish folk musician Brigid Mae Power in 2016; they subsequently separated.

== Discography ==
=== Solo recordings ===
- Give It to the Sky: Arthur Russell's Tower of Meaning Expanded (2023, Erased Tapes, CD, LP, MP3)
- Blackberry (2020, Erased Tapes, CD, LP, MP3)
- Peter Broderick & Friends Play Arthur Russell (2018, Pretty Purgatory, MP3)
- All Together Again (2017, Erased Tapes, CD, LP, MP3)
- Grunewald (2016, Erased Tapes, CD, LP, MP3)
- Partners (2016, Erased Tapes, CD, LP, MP3)
- Colours of the Night (2015, Bella Union, CD, LP, mp3)
- Float 2013 (2013, Erased Tapes, CD, LP, mp3)
- These Walls of Mine (2012, Erased Tapes, CD, LP, mp3)
- http://www.itstartshear.com (2012, Cooperative Music / Bella Union, CD, LP)
- How They Are (2010, Bella Union, CD, LP, mp3)
- Three Film Score Intakes (2010, Schedios, 3″ CD-R, 200 copies)
- Music for a Sleeping Sculpture of Peter Broderick (2009, Slaapwel Records, CD, mp3, 500 copies)
- 4 Track Songs (2009, Type Recordings, CD, 2xLP)
- Five Film Score Outtakes (2009, Secret Furry Hole, 3" CD-R, 200 copies)
- Music for Falling from Trees (2009, Erased Tapes/Western Vinyl, CD, mp3)
- Ten Duets (2009, Digitalis Ltd, Compact Cassette)
- Games Again/Roscoe (2008, Bella Union, 07")
- Home (2008, Bella Union, Hush, Type, CD, LP, mp3)
- Float (2008, Type Recordings, CD, LP, mp3) and Float 2013 (2013, Erased Tapes, CD, LP, mp3)
- Docile (2007, Kning Disk, CD, 10", mp3)
- Retreat/Release (2007, Type Recordings, 07")

=== Collaborations ===
- "Blank Grey Canvas Sky" with Machinefabriek (2009, Fang Bomb, CD, LP, mp3)
- "Falling from Trees" with Neon Dance (2009, Erased Tapes/Neon Dance, dance score commission)
- "Mort Aux Vaches" with Machinefabriek and Jan and Romke Kleefstra, Chris Bakker, Nils Frahm (2010, Staalplaat, CD)
- "Music for Confluence" (2011, Erased Tapes, CD, mp3)
- "Wonders" (as Oliveray) with Nils Frahm (2011, Erased Tapes, LP, mp3)
- "Let Your Hands Be My Guide" with Chantal Acda, Nils Frahm, Gyda Valtysdottir and Shahzad Ismaily (2013, Gizeh Records, CD, LP, mp3)
- "Soul" with Rival Consoles (2013, Erased Tapes, CD, LP, mp3)
- "Sunday Songs" as part of Beacon Sound Choir (2016, First Terrace Records, LP)
- "Find the Ways" (as Allred & Broderick) with David Allred (2017, Erased Tapes, CD, LP, mp3)
