= Parades (Efterklang album) =

Studio album by Efterklang
- Released: October 15, 2007
- Genres: Post-rock, dream pop, neoclassical dark wave
- Length: 48:59
- Label: The Leaf Label / Rumraket

Efterklang chronology
Under Giant Trees (2007)	Parades (2007)	Magic Chairs (2010)

Professional ratings
Aggregate scores
Source	Rating
Metacritic	77/100
Review scores
Source	Rating
Drowned in Sound	10/10
Mojo	4/5 stars
MusicOMH	4.5/5 stars
NME	7/10
Pitchfork	7.4/10
PopMatters	7/10 stars
Q	4/5 stars
The Skinny	4/5 stars
Stylus Magazine	A−
Uncut	4/5 stars

Parades is the second full-length album by the Danish group Efterklang. It marks the first time that the band work with an outside influence; after eighteen months of recording, the band drafted in British producer/engineer Darren Allison (Spiritualized, The Divine Comedy) to create the final mixes together with Efterklang's own Mads Brauer.

In 2015, Parades was reissued on double vinyl by The Leaf Label as part of the label's 20th anniversary, after the album was selected in a public poll. This limited edition release has been made available to fans via the PledgeMusic service before it will be in stores in early 2015.

== Track listing ==
1. "Polygyne"– 6:58
2. "Mirador" – 5:08
3. "Him Poe Poe" – 2:21
4. "Horseback Tenors" – 5:48
5. "Mimeo" – 1:22
6. "Frida Found a Friend" - 5:18
7. "Maison de Réflexion" - 5:33
8. "Blowing Lungs Like Bubbles" - 2:46
9. "Caravan" - 4:59
10. "Illuminant" - 4:33
11. "Cutting Ice to Snow" - 4:13

== Credits ==
- Produced by Efterklang.
- Mixed by Darren Allison and Mads Brauer.
- Artwork by Hvass&Hannibal.
