= She Keeps Bees =

American rock band

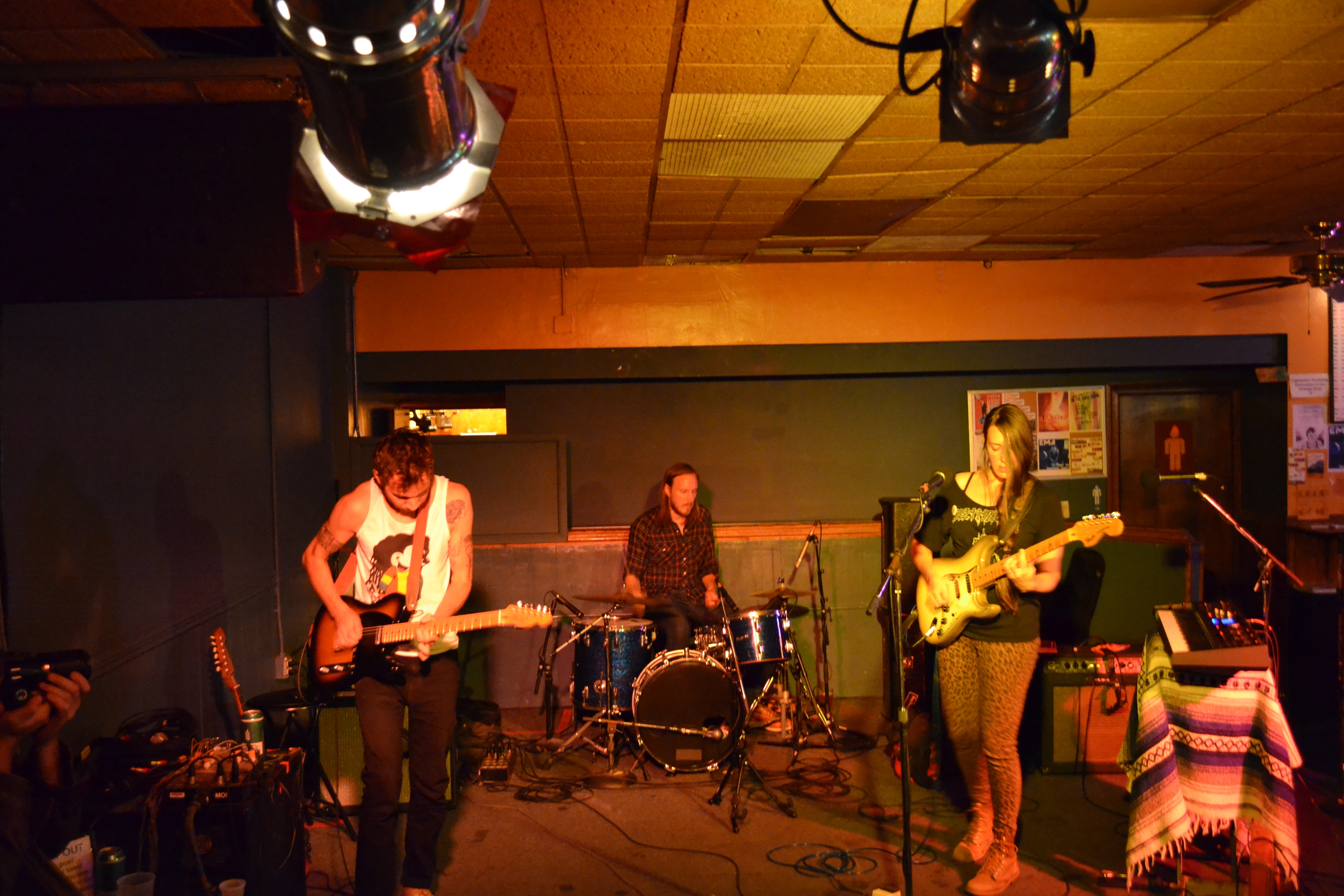
She Keeps Bees performing at the Beachland Tavern in Cleveland in 2014

She Keeps Bees is a rock band from Brooklyn, New York, formed in 2006 and consisting of Jessica Larrabee on vocals and guitar and Andy LaPlant on drums. They have been compared to Patti Smith, the White Stripes, The Kills, PJ Harvey, and Cat Power.

== History ==
Larrabee was recording an album as a solo artist under the name She Keeps Bees ("bees" coming from her surname) and met LaPlant when she was his bartender. He helped record her music and began attending her shows, until she suggested he play with her. They formed their band in 2006. They record their music in their home in Brooklyn. Larrabee has also been a guest vocalist on Groove Armada's Grammy-nominated album Black Light. They have supported The Joy Formidable, and played at SXSW in 2010. They signed to Domino Publishing in July 2010. Their third album Dig On, recorded during November 2010 in a log home in the Catskill Mountains, was released in July 2011.

== Members ==
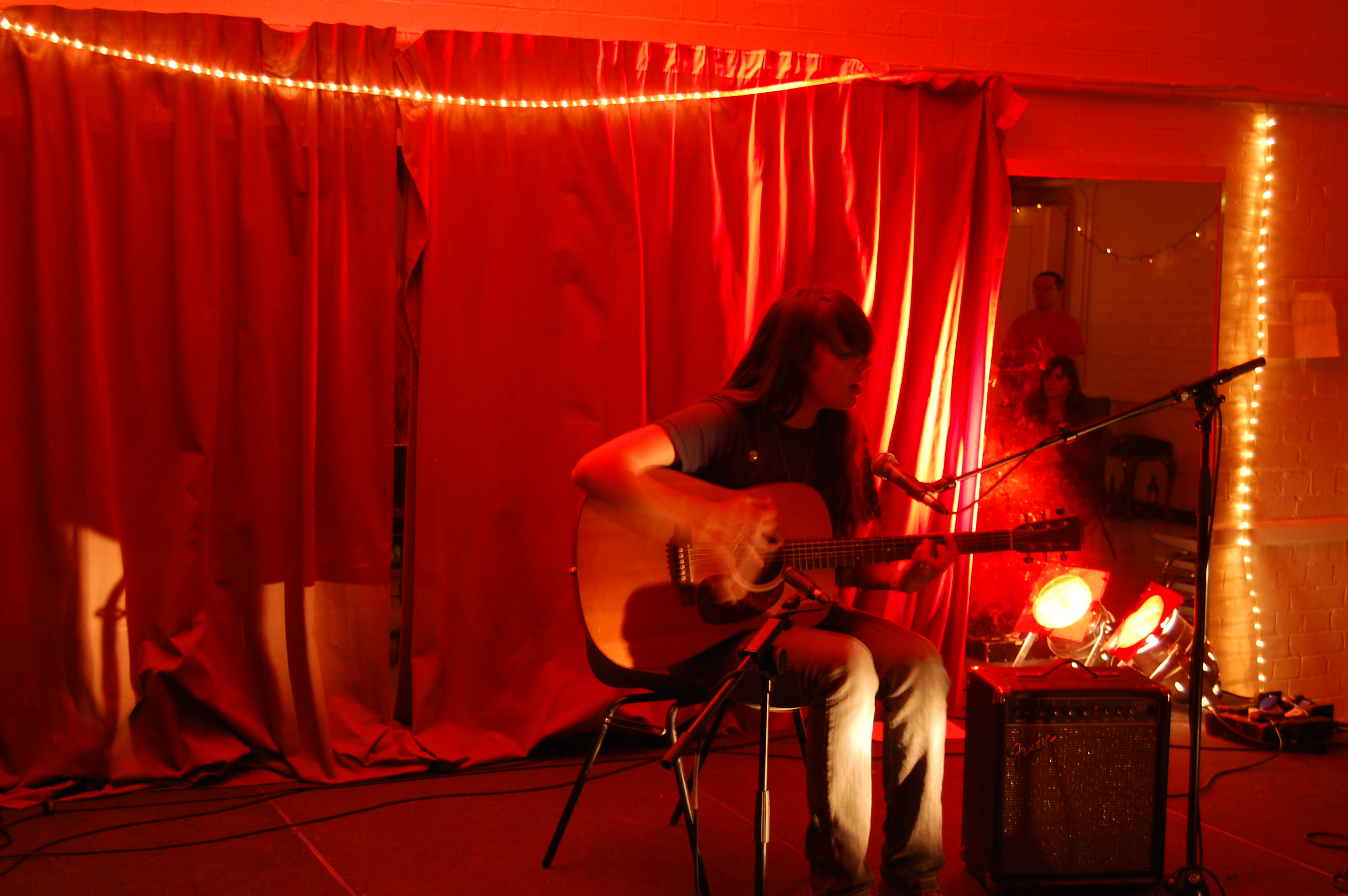
Jessica Larrabee playing in 2009

Jessica Larrabee is a singer-songwriter and guitarist who has been in other bands. She taught her partner Andy LaPlant to play drums; he is a recording engineer and producer. Larrabee says of their playing that "I sing until my stomach hurts while Andy beats the shit out the drums" and has acknowledged comparisons to Cat Power.

== Reception ==
The Guardian said that "they're like the White Stripes in reverse." Drowned in Sound said of Larrabee that "she has amazing control over her vocals, able to simultaneously be fiery and reserved, seductive and vaguely crude", and fellow Brooklyn musician Sharon Van Etten said "she has one of the best voices I have ever heard and she has more soul in one finger than most female singers have in our scene." The New York Times's ArtsBeat compared her to PJ Harvey, but added that "far from Ms. Harvey’s theatrical poise, Ms. Larrabee is loose, vehement and unchoreographed, jittering around the stage." The Quietus said of Nests that "the album does its duty, forms a songbook for the pissed off, the heavy-lidded and the sultry." The Observer said it was "sparse, soulful and defiantly retro." Contact Music argued that "in some parts the album isn’t an easy listen but once you’re in to it, it’s very rewarding."

== Discography ==
=== Albums ===
- Minisink Hotel, self-released, 2006
- Shhhh EP, self-released, 2007
- Nests, self-released, 2008 (UK release, names Records, 2009. 2016 BB*Island)
- Revival EP, UK (names Records), 2009
- Dig On, self-released, 2011
- Eight Houses, Future Gods (US) and BB*Island (EU), 2014
- Kinship, Ba Da Bing (US) and BB*Island (Europe), 2019

=== Singles ===
- "SKB-005", 7" single, 2010
- "SKB-007" 7" single, 2012
- "Our Bodies" 7" single, 2017 (Charity Single)
