= Tripper (Efterklang album) =

Studio album by Efterklang
- Released: October 25, 2004
- Genres: Post-rock, electronic, glitch
- Length: 50:36
- Label: The Leaf Label

Efterklang chronology
Springer (2003)	Tripper (2004)	Under Giant Trees (2007)

Professional ratings
Review scores
Source	Rating
AllMusic	3.5/5 stars
Pitchfork	(7.9/10)

Tripper is the debut album by the Danish group Efterklang. The name of the album, according to member Thomas Humser, refers to two things: one, "tripper" is the slang term for a traveler; and two, it is also a Danish meaning for shuffling one's feet in anticipation of something good to happen. The album cover was done by Marie Hill and is a mashing of doodles she drew. The logo of the child dancing next to the band's name is supposed to represent the childlike approach to this music. The self-released limited-edition version of the album had a hand-stitched card sleeve.

== Track listing ==
1. "Foetus" – 3:10
2. "Swarming" – 6:32
3. "Step Aside" – 4:38
4. "Prey and Predator" – 6:26
5. "Collecting Shields" – 5:57
6. "Doppelgänger" – 6:40
7. "Tortuous Tracks" – 3:39
8. "Monopolist" – 6:57
9. "Chapter 6" – 6:37

== Personnel and credits ==
1. Artwork By [Cover Concept] - Efterklang
2. Artwork By [Front And Label Drawings] - Marie Hill
3. Cello - Ida Kühn Riegels (tracks: 1, 2, 5, 8), Marianne Larsen (tracks: 2, 4, 8, 9)
4. Choir - Ditte Marie Legard Ipsen, Katrine & Anne Fokdal Choir (tracks: 1 to 3, 5, 8, 9), # Dubbelgänger Men's Choir (tracks: 3 to 6, 8, 9), Grøndlændertruppen MIK (tracks: 1, 4, 5, 9)
5. Double Bass - Eva Skipper (tracks: 4, 6, 9)
6. Flugelhorn, French Horn - Bo Holm-Nielsen (tracks: 5, 8, 9)
7. Flute - Lise Bertelsen (tracks: 3, 4, 9)
8. Mastered by - Michael Schwabe
9. Performer - Casper Clausen, Mads Brauer*, Rasmus Stolberg, Rune Mølgaard, Thomas Husmer
10. Performer [Visuals] - Karim Ghahwagi
11. Producer – Casper
12. Recorded By, Mixed By, Producer – Mads
13. Trombone - Jesper Bergmann (tracks: 5, 8, 9), Nils Carlsson (tracks: 6 to 9), Rasmus Skovgaard (tracks: 5, 8, 9)
14. Trumpet - Henrik Lützen (tracks: 5, 8, 9), Kristina Schjelde (tracks: 1, 3 to 5, 8)
15. Violin - Edda Rún Ólafsdóttir (tracks: 1, 3, 5, 6), Hildur Àrsælsdóttir* (tracks: 1, 3, 5, 6), # Nils Grøndal (tracks: 2, 4, 8, 9)
16. Vocals - Linda Drejer Bonde (tracks: 2 to 6, 8, 9), Thomas Sjöberg (tracks: 2, 4 to 6)
17. All songs written by - Efterklang
