= Heather Woods Broderick =

American musician and composer

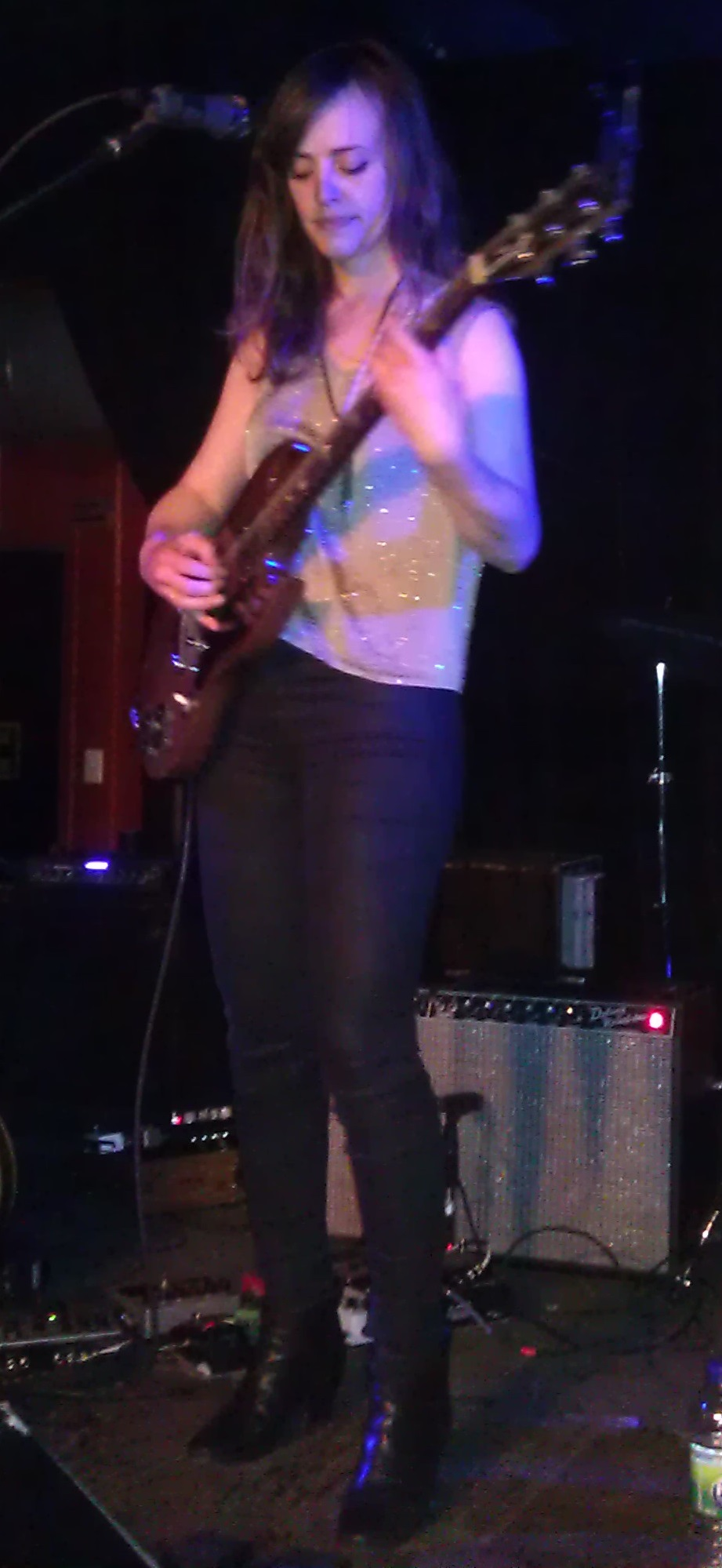

Background information
- Genres: Folk music, Indie music, Ambient music
- Labels: Preservation, Western Vinyl

Heather Woods Broderick (born June 7, 1983) is an American musician and composer. She has released solo material under her own name, been a member of Efterklang, Horse Feathers and Loch Lomond, and been a member of the backing bands of Laura Gibson, Sharon Van Etten, and Lisa Hannigan.

== Biography ==
Broderick was born in the state of Maine. She was born at home to two musicians and raised in Portland, Oregon, where she started piano lessons at the age of 8.

She plays piano, cello, guitar and flute.

She is the sister of Peter Broderick, also a solo artist and Efterklang collaborator.

Broderick has also backed Portland-based singer-songwriter, Alela Diane, among others.

Broderick has toured with many other artists including Horse Feathers, Efterklang, and Sharon Van Etten, which has kept Broderick moving locations for nearly a decade.

== Discography ==
=== Solo recordings ===
- From The Ground (21 Sep 2009, Preservation, CD, LP, mp3)
- Glider (10 July 2015, Western Vinyl, CD, LP, mp3)
- Invitation (19 April 2019, Western Vinyl, CD, LP, mp3)
- Domes (2022)
- Labyrinth (7 April 2023, Western Vinyl, CD, LP, mp3)

=== Collaborations ===
- Portland Stories (2009)
- Magic Chairs, Efterklang (2010)
- "Nightingale" on the album Domestic Eyes by Fast Friends (2020)
- Domes (2022, Western Vinyl, CD, LP, mp3)
