= Efterklang =

Danish indie rock group

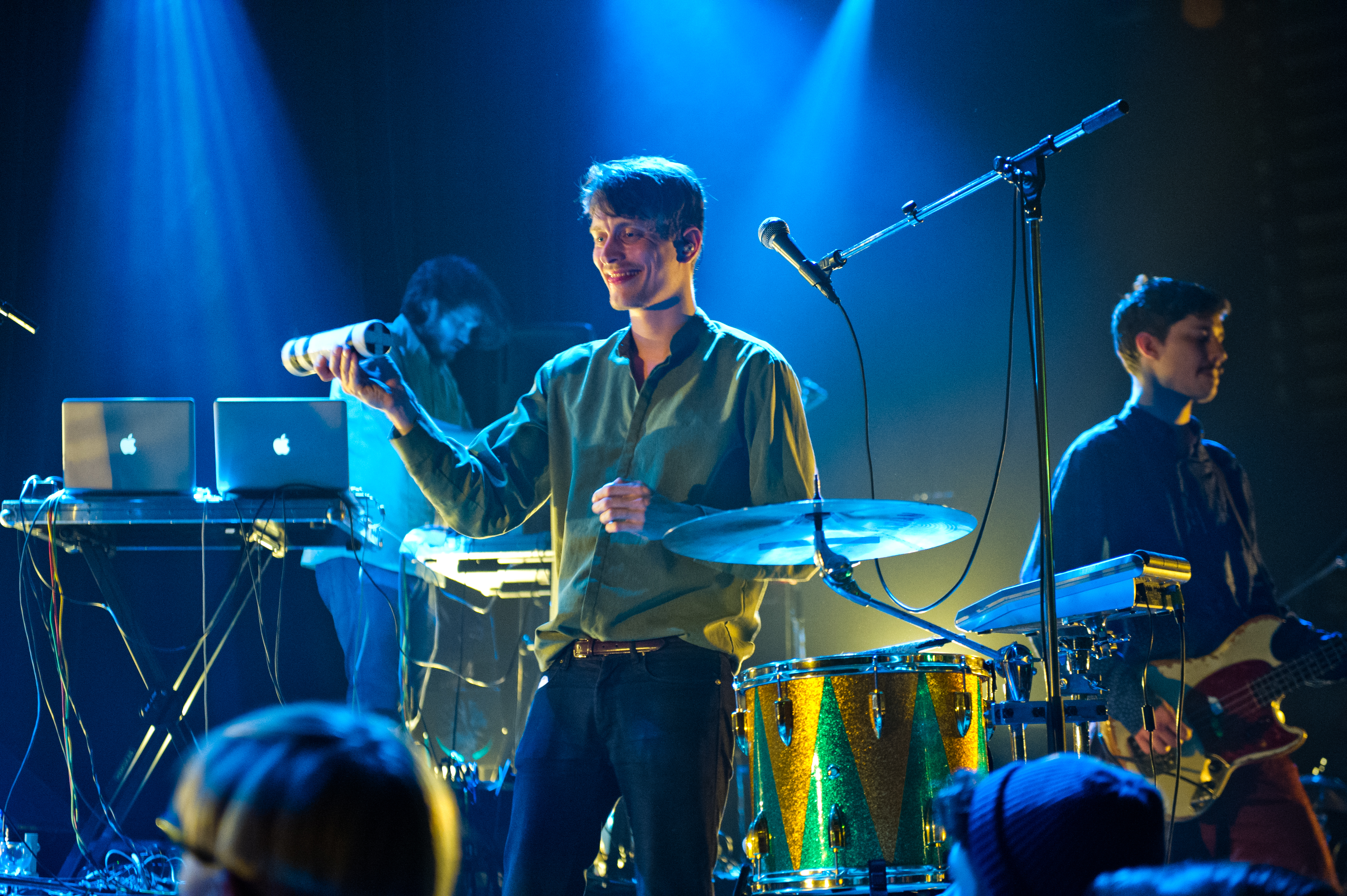
- Efterklang performing live.

Background information
- Origin: Copenhagen, Denmark
- Genres: Indie folk, dream pop, indie rock, electronic, synth-pop (current), post-rock, dark wave, glitch (early)
- Years active: 2001–present
- Labels: Rumraket, 4AD, The Leaf Label, City Slang
- Members: Casper Clausen; Mads Christian Brauer; Rasmus Stolberg
- Past members: Rune Mølgaard; Thomas Kirirath Husmer
- Website: official site

Supporting members (live)
- Members: Katinka Fogh Vindelev (vocal, piano); Martyn Heyne (guitar, keys); Tatu Rönkkö (drums)
- Past members: Budgie; Niklas Antonson; Heather Woods Broderick; Peter Broderick; Daniel James; Frederik Teige

Efterklang (Danish pronunciation: [ˈeftɐˌkʰlɑŋˀ]) is a Danish art pop, indie rock band from Copenhagen, formed in December 2000. Efterklang emerged in the early 2000s with a blend of pop and orchestral rock elements. The band found an audience, especially in Europe, after releasing their first two albums on England's the Leaf Label; the attention led to a deal with 4AD. The band has recorded five studio albums and are currently signed to City Slang.

== History ==
=== 2001–2011 ===
The name Efterklang comes from the Danish word for "remembrance" or "reverberation." Formed in Copenhagen, its three core members are Casper Clausen, Mads Brauer and Rasmus Stolberg. The original lineup also included Rune Mølgaard, but he has taken a more secluded role since 2007. Drummer Thomas Husmer left the band 2011. When performing live, the core three-piece band is complemented with the addition of live band members.

Efterklang released their first album Tripper to warm critical acclaim in autumn 2004. Their second album Parades saw the band working with British producer Darren Allison (Spiritualized), and was released in October 2007, receiving widespread critical acclaim by the likes of Mojo, Uncut, Drowned in Sound and Stylus magazine. Parades was named the 38th best album released between April 2005 to April 2009 by Clash in April 2009. In September 2008, Efterklang and The Danish National Chamber Orchestra performed Parades in its entirety at the Copenhagen Concert Hall; the performance was documented on a limited edition LP/DVD set entitled Performing Parades, which was released in October 2009.

In September 2009, Efterklang signed a new record deal with the British independent label 4AD. Their third full-length album Magic Chairs was Efterklang's first on their new label, released in February 2010. Magic Chairs won IMPALA's European Independent Album of the Year on 28 February. The record was well received by Pitchforkmedia.

In August 2010, French filmmaker Vincent Moon and Efterklang's 8-piece live band met up on an island off the Danish coast. The objective was to shoot a film with the same length as an album, and a film full of performances, experiments and collaborations. The result was called An Island.

In 2011, drummer and trumpet player Thomas Husmer left the band and the other members announced that they would carry on as a trio.

=== Piramida (2012) ===
In 2012, the band went on tour to present their fourth album Piramida with an orchestra and drummer Budgie of Siouxsie and the Banshees as special guest for the live shows. The premiere at Sydney's "Opera House" in June was praised by Time Out and Mojo. The latter wrote : "Piramida is the sound of Efterklang’s grasp meeting their reach, of their ambition evading the pretentious, the blankly grandiose, and rewarding them with a masterpiece.". A European leg coincided with the release of Piramida. The band performed with an orchestra and Budgie in Ireland, Scandinavia, UK, the Netherlands and Belgium.

At its release in September, their fourth album Piramida received good reviews. Mojo rated it four stars and said: "Despite the elegant grey-sky thinking, deep beneath the emotional permafrost, Piramida isn't as cold as it seems". BBC Music said : "This see-saw, between exquisite gloom and bruised hope, is part of what makes Piramida so powerful" before concluding by these words, "rarely have the Serious Young Man Blues been articulated with such grace, so affectingly". British Fact magazine wrote: "Piramida is an abandoned mining town located deep within the Arctic Circle. It’s the setting for Efterklang’s fourth and finest album, an acutely musicianly affair employing lorry loads of classical instruments, brass, synths and what appears to be a choir of thousands broadcasting from the deep end of a fjord". Q magazine commented: "here’s a band on top of the world, and on top of their game… Piramida is a revelation."

From December Efterklang went on tour with their new 6-piece band. In 2013, the Piramida tour took the band around North America and Europe.

=== Leaf Label Re-issues (2015) ===
In 2015, The Leaf Label released a number of re-issues as part of its 20th anniversary celebrations. A poll enabled fans to vote for which albums from the label's back catalogue they wished to see re-issued, and Efterklang's Parades was selected. The album, released on double vinyl LP, was initially available to fans through the PledgeMusic service and was introduced to shops in early 2016. A double vinyl re-issue of Tripper was also available from The Leaf Label after a successful BeatDelete campaign.

=== Liima ===
In 2016, the members of Efterklang, along with drummer Tatu Rönkkö, formed the band Liima. They released their debut album, ii, on 18 March 2016. The album received positive reviews, earning a score of 70 on Metacritic, based on 8 reviews.

Liima's second album, 1982, was released on 3 November 2017.

=== Altid Sammen, Windflowers & Things We Have In Common ===
In 2019, shortly before the COVID-19 pandemic, Efterklang returned with the album Altid Sammen, the first time they wrote and sang in Danish.

Front man Casper Clausen released his debut solo album Better Way in January 2021.

It was followed in 2021 by the band's Windflowers, which featured the singles 'Living Other Lives' and 'Hold Me Close When You Can'.

In September 2024 the band released Things We Have In Common, featuring the singles 'Animated Heart', 'To A New Day' and 'Getting Reminders' with Beirut. In October the band went on an international tour.

== Rumraket ==
Efterklang has released albums on the British/American record label The Leaf Label, but have also released material on their own record label Rumraket (the Danish word for "space rocket"). The Rumraket roster includes releases from Grizzly Bear, Amiina, Cacoy, Erik Levander, Kama Aina, Slaraffenland, Taxi Taxi!, and Canon Blue.

Efterklang has a history of working with many guest musicians on their recordings. They have also produced a vast number of artistic music videos by filmmakers such as Karim Ghahwagi, Tobias Stretch, Anders Morgenthaler, Carolina Melis, and Jeremiah Zagar. Nan Na Hvass from Hvass&Hannibal is the creator of the critically acclaimed artwork for Efterklang's One-Sided LP, Under Giant Trees, Parades, and the "Mirador" music video.

== Band members ==
=== Core group members ===
- Casper Clausen – vocals
- Mads Brauer – electronics
- Rasmus Stolberg – bass

=== Live band members ===
- Katinka Fogh Vindelev – vocals (2012–present)
- Tatu Rönkkö – drums (2012–present)
- Martyn Heyne – Guitar, Vocals, Piano (2012–present)
- Peter Broderick – violin, multi-instrumentalist (2007–2012)
- Budgie – drums (2012)
- Niklas Antonson – trombone, multi-instrumentalist (2007–2011)
- Heather Woods Broderick – piano, vocal, flute (2009–2011)
- Anna Brønsted – piano, vocal (2007–2008)
- Daniel James – guitar (2009–2011)
- Frederik Teige – guitar, saxophone, "choir"(2007–2010)

=== Former band members ===
- Rune Mølgaard – piano (2000–2007) (became part-time member after 2007, contributing to some songwriting)
- Thomas Husmer – drums, trumpet, percussion (2000–2011)

== Discography ==
=== Studio albums ===
As Efterklang

Year	Album	Peak positions	Certification
Year	Album	DEN	Certification
2004	Tripper: Release date: 25 October 2004; Record label: The Leaf Label	–	
2007	Parades: Release date: 15 October 2007; Record label: The Leaf Label	–	
2010	Magic Chairs: Release date: 22 February 2010; Record label: 4AD	10	
2012	Piramida: Release date: 22 September 2012; Record label: 4AD	8	
2016	Leaves: The Colour of Falling: Release date: 4 November 2016; Record label: Tambourhinoceros	—	
2019	Altid Sammen: Release date: 20 September 2019; Record label: 4AD	TBD	
2021	Windflowers: Release date: 8 October 2021; Record label: City Slang	—	-
2024	Things We Have In Common: Release date: 4 October 2024; Record label: City Slang	—	-

As Liima

- ii (2016)
- 1982 (2017)

=== Live albums ===
- Performing Parades (CD+DVD & LP+DVD, The Leaf Label – 19 October 2009)
- The Piramidia Concert (LP+CD, 4AD - 10 June 2013)

=== EPs and Mini albums ===
- Springer (EP) (self-released in 2003; re-released on The Leaf Label in 2005)
- One-Sided LP mini-album (Burnt Toast Vinyl – 22 January 2007)
- Under Giant Trees mini-album (The Leaf Label – 2 April 2007)

=== Singles ===
Year	Single	Peak positions	Certification	Album
Year	Single	DEN	Certification	Album
2007	"Under Giant Trees"	1		
2007	"Springer"	13		

Other singles

- "Swarming" (The Leaf Label – 7 February 2005)
- "Mirador" / "Cutting Ice to Snow" (promo-only single) (8 October 2007)
- "Caravan" (The Leaf Label – 7 April 2008)
- "Modern Drift" (promo-only single) (4AD – 25 January 2010)
- "I Was Playing Drums" (4AD – 19 April 2010)
- "Raincoats" (download-only single) (4AD – 23 August 2010)

== Videography – DVD ==
- 2009 Performing Parades with The Danish National Chamber Orchestra (Live)
- 2011 An Island by Vincent Moon
