= Alex McManus =

Musician from Omaha, Nebraska

Alex McManus is a musician from Omaha, Nebraska currently based in Vancouver, BC. He has played with such bands as Acorns, Empire State, Lambchop, Vic Chesnutt, and Bright Eyes. He is also in his own band called The Bruces.

== Selected discography ==
=== Albums as The Bruces ===
Year	Album details
1993	Family Day: Format: Cassette (Sing, Eunuchs!); Format: CD (2002 · Little Army); Format: Digital (Chunklet); Format: LP, ltd edition of 300 (2007 · Grotto Records)
2002	Hialeah Pink: Format: LP (1995 · Sing, Eunuchs!/Theme Park); Format: CD (2002 · Little Army); Format: Digital (2002 · Chunklet)
2002	The War of the Bruces: Format: CD (Misra)
2004	The Shining Path: Format: CD (Misra)
2018	Thieves in the Wick--Songs of Simon Joyner: Format: LP, ltd edition of 300 (Unread Records/Kerchow Records/Jackson Street Booksellers)

=== Singles as The Bruces ===
Year	Single Details
2000	"102" / "Oil and Vinegar": Format: 7-inch (Sommerveg)
2018	"I Make Marks" / "Invisible Ceiling": Format: Lathe-cut 7-inch (Unread Records)

=== Compilation Appearances as The Bruces ===
Year	Song	Album details
1994	"Killer"	You and What Army?: Format: Cassette (Sing, Eunuchs!)
1995	"Beginning to See the Light Fade"	Our Salvation Is in Hand: Format: CD (Theme Park)
1996	"Sharpening Stone"	Songs from a Room: Format: 7-inch (Sing, Eunuchs!)
1996	"Upbeat"	Carry On Ooij--A Brinkman Waaghals Compilation: Format: CD (Brinkman)
2003	"There"	As Yet No Title - Skewed Songwriter: Format: Cassette (Unread Records)

=== With Acorns ===
Year	Release details
1989	Acorns: Format: LP/Cassette (Post-Ambient Motion)
1991	Plainsongs: Format: Cassette (self-released)

=== With Frontier Trust ===
Year	Release details	Credits
1992	The Highway Miles EP: Format: 7-inch (One Hour Records)	Bass, vocals

=== With Simon Joyner ===
Year	Release details	Credits
1994	The Cowardly Traveller Pays His Toll: Format: LP (Sing, Eunuchs!); Format: LP (2008 · Team Love)	Violin
1995	Heaven's Gate: Format: LP (Sing, Eunuchs!); Format: CD (1996 · Brinkman)	Violin
1997	Songs for the New Year: Format: LP (Sing, Eunuchs!); Format: CD (Shrimper Records)	Guest artist, guitar, violin
1998	Yesterday, Tomorrow and in Between: Format: 2LP, CD (Sing, Eunuchs!)	Guest artist
2003	"Here Come the Balloons" / "They Say Man Cannot Fly": Format: 7-inch (Tongue Master)	Acoustic guitar, electric guitar, percussion, vocals
2004	Lost with the Lights On: Format: LP, CD (Jagjaguwar)	
2006	Beautiful Losers: Singles and Compilation Tracks 1994-1999: Format: 2LP, CD (Jagjaguwar)	Concertina, mastering, sequencing, violin, whistle (human)
2006	Skeleton Blues: Format: LP, CD (Jagjaguwar)	Acoustic guitar, electric guitar, pedal steel
2009	Out into the Snow: Format: LP, CD (Team Love)	Musician
2017	Step into the Earthquake: Format: LP, CD (Ba Da Bing!)	Main personnel

=== With Vic Chesnutt ===
Year	Release details	Credits
1995	Is the Actor Happy?: Format: LP, CD (Texas Hotel)	Concertina, guitar, piano
1996	About to Choke: Format: LP, CD (Capitol)	Acoustic guitar, electric guitar
1998	The Salesman and Bernadette (with Lambchop): Format: LP/CD (Capricorn)	Atmosphere, euphonium, electric guitar, backing vocals, whistle (human)

=== With Lambchop ===
Year	Release details	
1996	Thriller: Format: LP, CD (Merge, City Slang)	Performer
1996	"Cigarettiquette" / "Mr. Crabby": Format: 7-inch (Merge)	
1997	"Whitey" / "Playboy the Shit": Format: 7-inch (Merge)	
1998	What Another Man Spills: Format: LP, CD (Merge, City Slang)	
1998	"Your Fucking Sunny Day": Format: 7-inch (Merge)	
1998	"Give Me our Love (Love Song)": Format: 7-inch (Merge)	
2000	Nixon: Format: LP, CD (Merge, City Slang)	Electric guitar
2000	The Queens Royal Trimma: Format: CD (City Slang); Tour-only release	Guitar
2000	"Up with People" / "Miss Prissy": Format: 7-inch (Merge)	Electric guitar, group member
2001	Tools in the Dryer: Format: CD (Merge)	
2002	Is a Woman: Format: LP, CD (Merge, City Slang)	Acoustic guitar, electric guitar
2002	Treasure Chest of the Enemy: Format: CD (self-released); Tour-only release	Guitar
2002	Pet Sounds Sucks: Format: CD (self-released); Tour-only release	Guitar
2004	Aw Cmon: Format: LP, CD (Merge, City Slang); Also released as 2LP, 2CD with No You Cmon	Guitar, piano (thumb), group member
2004	No You Cmon: Format: LP, CD (Merge, City Slang); Also released as 2LP, 2CD with Aw Cmon	Guitar, piano (thumb), group member
2004	L'Aurore (Sunrise): Format: DVD (Carlotta Films)	
2004	Lambchop + The DAFO String Quartet: Boo Fucking Who?: Format: CD (self-released); Tour-only release	Guitar
2006	Decline of Country and Western Civilization, Pt. 2: Format: LP, CD (Merge, City Slang)	Group member
2006	Damaged: Format: LP, CD (Merge, City Slang)	Guitars
2007	No Such Silence (Live at the AB in Brussels): Format: DVD (City Slang)	Guitar
2008	Oh (ohio): Format: LP, CD (Merge, City Slang)	Acoustic guitar, electric guitar
2009	Live at XX Merge: Format: DVD (Merge)	Performer

=== With Empire State ===
Year	Release details	Credits
1999	Empire State: Format: CD (Warm Electronic Recordings)	Autoharp, bells, cello, chimes, horn, marxophone, trombone
2000	Why Climb the Highest Mountain EP: Format: 12" (Melodic Records)	
2001	Eternal Combustion: Format: CD (Warm Electronic Recordings)	Multi-instrumentalist

=== With Bright Eyes ===
Year	Release details	Credits
2004	Lua EP: Format: 7-inch, CD (Saddle Creek)	Composer, guitar, vocals
2005	I'm Wide Awake, It's Morning: Format: LP, CD (Saddle Creek)	Guitar
2005	Motion Sickness: Live Recordings: Format: LP, CD (Team Love)	Group member, performer

=== Other appearances ===
Year	Artist	Release details	Credits
1999	Olivia Tremor Control	at NPR Studios	Trombone, percussion
2000	The Deist's Pouch	"Everybody Has a Pouch" / "Backsliding Deist's Prayer": Format: 7-inch (Sommerveg); Featuring Vic Chesnutt and members of Calexico, Lambchop, and Empire State	Acoustic guitar, recorder, backing vocals
2001	Summer Hymns	A Celebratory Arm Gesture: Format: CD (Misra)	Trombone
2002	Azure Ray	Burn and Shiver: Format: CD (Warm Electronic Recordings)	Euphonium, trombone
2004	A Tomato a Day (Brian Poloncic)	The Moon Is Green: Format: CD (Public Eyesore)	Engineer
2004	Tilly and the Wall	Wild Like Children: Format: CD (Team Love)	Assistant engineer
2004	Ed Gray	Fresh Coat on the Powder Keg: Format: 7-inch (Unread)	Engineer
2006	Ed Gray	The Late Gray Ed Great: Format: LP (Hot Potato Records)	Electric guitar, violin, engineer
2007	Charlie Louvin	Charlie Louvin: Format: CD (Tomkins Square)	Featured artist, vocals, background vocals on "The Kneeling Drunkard's Plea"
2007	Outlaw Con Bandana	The Triple Escape: Format: Lathe-cut LP	Engineer, musician
2008	Crooked Fingers	Forfeit/Fortune: Format: LP, CD (Red Pig & Foreign Leisure)	Assistant Engineer
2009	Miracles of God	O What a Wonderful Day: Format: LP, CD (Public School Records)	Engineer
2010	William Tyler	Behold the Sprit: Format: LP, CD (Tompkins Square)	Brass, electronics, tapes, violin
2010	Bill Hoover	Here We Go: Format: Lathe-cut LP	Engineer
