= Punching the Clown (album) =

2026 studio album by Lambchop

- The album cover for Punching the Clown

Studio album by Lambchop
- Released: August 21, 2026
- Recorded: August–December 2025
- Studios: April Base Studios (Fall Creek); VOCES8 Centre (London); Beech House Recording (Pawleys Island)
- Genres: Folk; country
- Length: 47:48
- Labels: Merge, City Slang
- Producer: Ryan Olson

Lambchop chronology
The Bible (2022)	Punching the Clown (2026)

Singles from Punching the Clown
- 1. "Weakened" Released: May 6, 2026; 2. "Stella" Released: June 10, 2026; 3. "The New World Wave" Released: July 21, 2026

Punching the Clown is the seventeenth studio album by the American band Lambchop. The band's first album since The Bible (2022), it was released on August 21, 2026, through Merge Records in the United States and through City Slang elsewhere. After exploring electronic music between FLOTUS (2016) and The Bible, the band largely returned to the folk and country sounds which characterized their earlier albums. The album differentiates itself with the inclusion of two gospel choirs – the Eau Claire Vocal Sextet and the London Choir – on every track, imparting significant influence from the genre. Inspiration for the album originated on a night when Kurt Wagner, who is the only constant member of Lambchop, was enthralled in a song consisting solely of one banjo chord and a few voices on the radio. During an unsuccessful search for the song, Wagner discovered lined-out hymnody, which is a gospel form of call and response; he wanted to make an album in the style.

Wagner wrote or co-wrote every track; most were co-written by guitarist Andrew Broder, who became a member of Lambchop during the release cycles of Showtunes (2021) and The Bible. The two collaborated remotely, as Broder would send Wagner instrumental demos for him to write accompanying lyrics. Reviewers and commenters detected various lyrical themes, including political commentary, absurdism, and storytelling. Also returning from the previous two albums was the album's producer, Ryan Olson, on whose recommendation Wagner recruited Justin Vernon of Bon Iver to play banjo. Blake Morgan wrote and directed the choir arrangements for the album, which did not strictly line out and were variously compared to the Beach Boys, pop music from before World War II, and other reference points. Several session musicians also participated. Percussion is absent except for one track which uses it sparingly. Mark Nevers helmed engineering and mixing, and recording took place on six dates throughout the second half of 2025.

Lambchop promoted Punching the Clown with three pre-release singles, a comedic short film titled Joke Country, and a concert tour. The band is set to release Demoed, a companion extended play which will feature guest musicians singing the lyrics over the original instrumental demos, on November 20. The album received acclaim from music critics; some regarded it to be among the best of either the year or Lambchop's discography. Several found the choral accompaniments to be diverse, innovative, or both. Wagner's songwriting received praise as successful in using old music forms to make something new, as well as for its humor and vulnerability. The album appeared on the national charts of Germany, Switzerland, and Scotland, reaching the top 25 in the latter country. It also entered several component album charts in the United Kingdom, including the top 10 of Americana Albums and Independent Albums.

== Background ==
Lambchop's twelfth studio album, FLOTUS (2016), began a string of releases from the band wherein Kurt Wagner – the band's frontman, principal songwriter, and only constant member – used AutoTune to electronically distort his voice. Shortly prior to the COVID-19 pandemic, Wagner met two Minneapolis-based record producers in Germany: Andrew Broder and Ryan Olson. He collaborated with them on Lambchop's fifteenth and sixteenth albums, Showtunes (2021) and The Bible (2022), respectively. Much of The Bible's lyrical content centered around death and aging. Grayson Haver Currin of NPR Music remarked that one of the album's final lyrics was a namecheck of the band's debut album, I Hope You're Sitting Down (1994); Haver Currin pontificated whether The Bible would be Lambchop's final album. Jack Probst for Paste dissented, opining that Wagner sounded newly inspired on the album. Wagner later told Uncut that he never intended for it to be the final Lambchop record, nor did he plan to quit making music.

According to a press release from Wagner, he heard a song on the radio in early 2024 while driving in search of a gas station. The song consisted of little more than a single chord played on a banjo with a few voices singing on top of it, and it enthralled Wagner, who attempted to search it out. Though he could not find the song, he discovered in his research lining out, a form of hymnody in which a precentor recites a line for the congregation to respond with either a repetition or a melody, thereby becoming a gospel form of call and response. This served as a major source of inspiration for Wagner, who with Punching the Clown aimed to capture "the raw beauty and power of the human voice with its unique varieties". He conceived the album as featuring just vocals, including choral, and banjo; he later decided to include guitar as well.

== Writing and recording ==
Justin Vernon (pictured in 2015) performed banjo on Punching the Clown.

Wagner and Olson reconvened to record new music. Broder rejoined them on guitar, having played keyboards on the previous two albums. Justin Vernon of Bon Iver was brought in to play banjo after Olson recommended him to Wagner. Blake Morgan, with whom Wagner had previously collaborated on a live performance in London, recruited and conducted two choirs for the album: the Eau Claire Vocal Sextet, and the 12-piece London Choir. Recording took place over a three day period in 2025, from August 25 to 27, at Vernon's April Base studio. The recording process was smooth on account of all involved having a clear vision of the finished album. This contrasted with recording processes for previous albums by the band, during which even small changes would often lead to the band listening to the album in full to determine how well those changes would fit. Olson produced the album, while Mark Nevers mixed and engineered it. Additional recording took place on November 17 at VOCES8 Centre in London. Mixing and final recording took place at Beech House Recording – Nevers's private studio on Pawleys Island – on December 15 and 16. The band recorded 30 songs for the album, though only 12 made the final tracklist.

Much of the writing for Punching the Clown took place at Wagner's late parents' apartment just outside Nashville, which had been left largely undisturbed after his father died. He chose the apartment as a place to write because of its quietness, and because he did not want to disturb his wife while she was working from home. Envisioning the album as sparse, Wagner sought to improve his songwriting abilities. He extensively researched his favorite songwriters, studying their methodologies and artistic motivations. Broder wrote much of the music for the album, having been asked by Wagner to "write [him] some hits". Broder felt writing for Wagner to be a challenge, but ultimately found it easier after he compared it to his work as a producer making beats for rappers. He recorded instrumental demo tapes and sent them to Wagner for him to write lyrics to go with the music. Wagner similarly found the task difficult with the material Broder gave him, but he felt rewarded by the finished product. Morgan enjoyed writing and directing the choir parts, feeling intrigued and excited to do so for an album by a traditionally indie-leaning artist.

In addition to lined-out hymnody, several other sources of inspiration informed the making of Punching the Clown. The album takes its name from the 2009 film starring the comedian Henry Phillips. The film made Wagner feel deeply pessimistic about the state of the music industry. When interviewed by Konstantinos Pappis for Our Culture Mag, Wagner expressed exhaustion from making music, and stated that his love for his collaborators was a driving force helping him continue. With several of those collaborators being Minnesota natives, Wagner commented to Racket that the state made him feel rejuvenated, creatively and otherwise. Aside from Broder and Olson, other Minnesotans present on the album include Randall Throckmorton on vocals and L.A. Buckner on castanets. Uncomfortable with the idea of receiving excessive attention, Wagner endeavored to use the album as a means to "disappear"; he wanted to make music without having to worry about promoting it, or being the most prominent figure in representing it. Other sources of inspiration included David Dunlap, who was an old art school teacher of Wagner and made him question whether art can ever be truly complete; and struggles with everyday life and interpersonal relationships in the contemporary United States political climate.

== Release ==
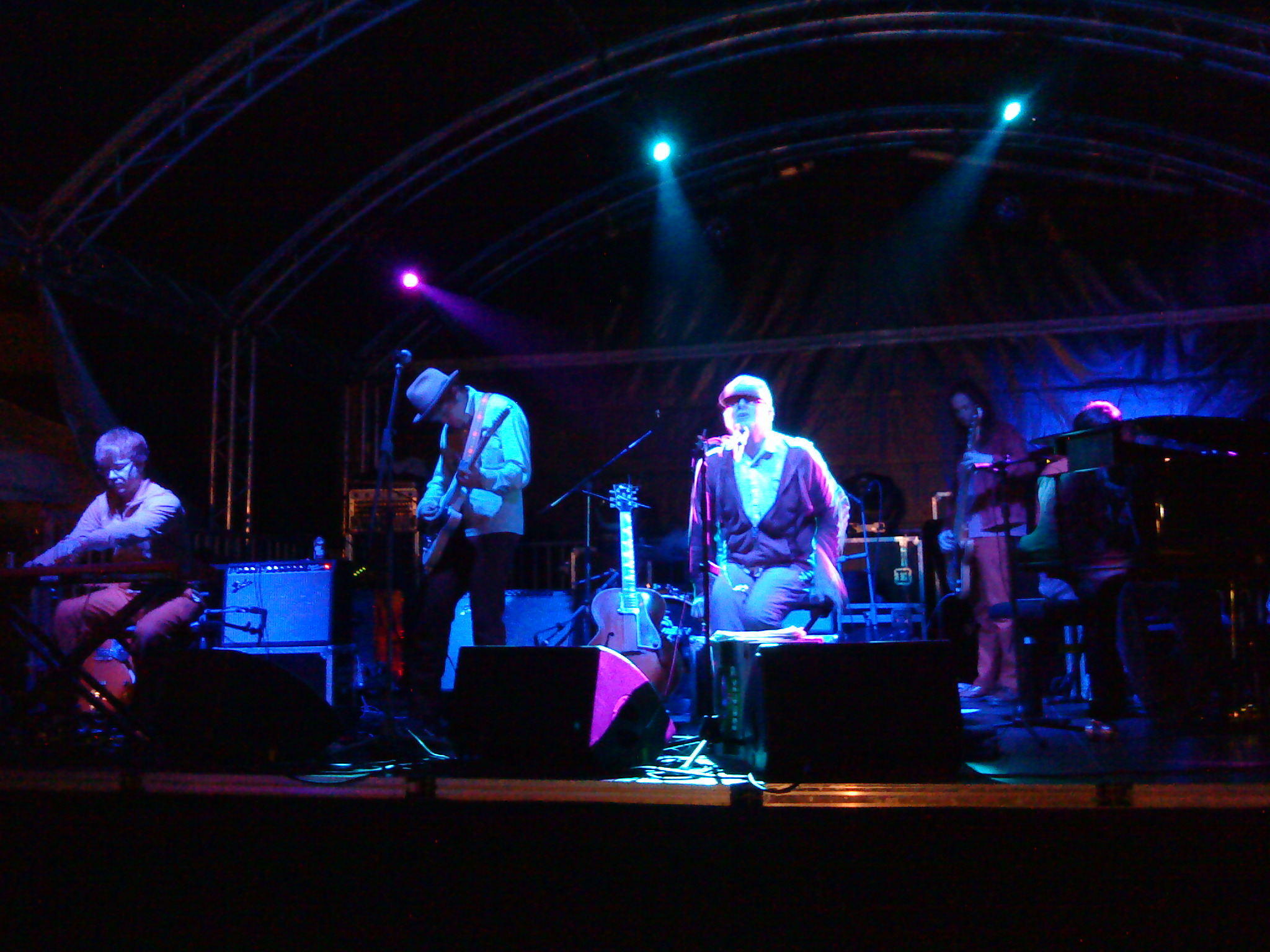
Lambchop performing in 2009

On December 5, 2025, Lambchop shared "Afterburner", their first new song since The Bible. It was released as part of a charity compilation album, Passages: Artists in Solidarity with Immigrants, Refugees, and Asylum Seekers. The band announced Punching the Clown on May 6 the following year, along with its tracklist, which included "Afterburner" as its ninth track. The band posted a promotional trailer two days later. Wagner chose the album title, which is a euphemism for masturbation, as a metaphor for the need for an artist to find enjoyment in one's craft. Opryland was another potential title he considered for the album.

The band released "Weakened" as the lead single from Punching the Clown in conjunction with the announcement of the album. Two more singles followed: "Stella" on June 10; and "The New World Wave" on July 21. The album was released on August 21 through Merge Records in the United States and through City Slang in other territories. Rough Trade Berlin hosted a listening event the night prior, wherein attendees could listen to the album in full.

Wagner released a comedic short film, Joke Country, on August 27. Although related to and released shortly after the album, it is not a traditional promotional film. Inspired by the original Punching the Clown and delivered in a deadpan style, the film depicts a fictional radio interview of Wagner, who is portrayed by Phillips; Steve Morse portrays the interviewer. The film employs off-topic tangents, satire, meta humor, and multiple running gags. According to Wagner, Phillips exercised and dyed his hair to prepare himself for the role.

Lambchop are currently touring behind the album as of November 2026. The tour began with a concert residency in the Dunsmore Jazz Room of the Crooners Supper Club in Minneapolis. The band performed there on June 28, August 30, and September 27; opening acts included Throckmorton, Daughter of Swords, Mike Davis, and Channy Leaneagh. (Note: Attributed to multiple sources:) These shows drew positive reviews from concertgoers, who described them as intimate. The band performed Punching the Clown in full each night; the September 27 show included an unreleased new song, "The Switch", as well as The Bible track "So There". The tour moved beyond Minneapolis on September 29, at the Old Town School of Folk Music in Chicago, followed by two shows in Brooklyn at Public Records on October 1 and 2. The band is scheduled to tour Europe from November 2026 through February 2027.

=== Demoed ===
MJ Lenderman (pictured in 2025) sang lead vocals on an alternate version of "Weakened" which served as the lead single from Demoed.

In an interview with Uncut, Wagner hinted at releasing demos of songs from Punching the Clown with other artists supplanting him on lead vocals. Artists he had reportedly approached included Leaneagh, MJ Lenderman, Alan Sparhawk, and Jenn Wasner. On October 27, Lambchop announced Demoed, a companion extended play (EP) which will feature each of the four aforementioned musicians, along with three others, singing over the original instrumental demos. Merge Records and City Slang released Lenderman's version of "Weakened" as its lead single the same day. The EP is slated for a digital release on November 20, and a physical release on February 5, 2027.

== Music and lyrics ==
Musically, Punching the Clown is primarily a folk and country album, with significant influence from gospel on account of the contributions from the Eau Claire Vocal Sextet and the London Choir. (Note: Attributed to multiple sources:) The album blurs lines between genres according to Nashville Scene's Sean Maloney, who cited second track "A Doctor in the House" as an example by way of its "walk[ing] a knife's edge between chamber country and baroque folk." Multiple reviewers considered the album's atmosphere to be simultaneously calming and disturbing.

The album's instrumentation predominantly comprises vocals, acoustic guitar, and banjo. The incorporation of the two choirs does not strictly follow the formula of lining out, often offering harmony or counter-melody to Wagner instead. Alexis Petridis of The Guardian considered the choral backing vocals to be reminiscent of pop music from before World War II, while Ljubinko Zivkovic of Beats Per Minute and Thomas Britt of Spectrum Culture were occasionally reminded of the Beach Boys. Wagner's vocals were described as sounding unvarnished and intimate while employing several different techniques, such as crooning, drawling, whispering, and shouting.

Electronic sound effects sporadically appear courtesy of Olson's production. Bass guitar appears on three tracks, each featuring a different musician playing it. With the sole exception of Buckner's castanets on third track "Weakened", the album lacks percussion. Some critics considered sound effects akin to breaking glass on seventh track "The New World Wave", as well as Vernon's banjo work throughout the album, to have percussive elements. His playing deviates from the clawhammer style typically associated with banjo; Bob Fish for For Folk's Sake said it sounded like he was playing it as he would a guitar.

Critics and commenters offered varying descriptions of the album's lyrical content. Several remarked that certain songs contained political undertones. (Note: Attributed to multiple sources:) Petridis and Record Collector's Jamie Atkins described the lyrics as indirect and mystifying, in line with previous Lambchop albums. Maloney assessed that several songs focused on individual characters. Pitchfork and Glide Magazine wrote that the lyrics were humorous; the former darkly, and the latter surrealistically.

=== Tracks 1–6 ===
The Minnesotan city of Nicollet (pictured in 1991) lends its name to the first song on Punching the Clown.

Punching the Clown opens with "Just West of Nicollet", which is named in reference to the city of Nicollet, Minnesota. The song establishes a rough template for the album by beginning with a banjo, acoustic guitar, and quiet choral voices preceding Wagner's vocals. The first two lines of the album are "I'm a human calculator and I never make mistakes" and "And I've been smoking like a Russian cosmonaut". These lines were considered contradictory by Miranda Wollen of Paste and unusual subject matter for folk music by Christopher Raley of Glide Magazine. During the third minute, a hip-hop-esque vocal sample of someone proclaiming, "Lambchop new shit!", plays over the song while the band continues uninterrupted.

"A Doctor in the House" carries a darker atmosphere and, according to Britt, discusses themes of "mortality and responsibility". Its first verse constitutes a metaphor about people hitting a punching bag, which Raley called a "zeitgeist". The song largely eschews the choirs in favor of a solo vocal performance from Wagner, until the choirs come in near the end with a refrain of "fight, fight, fight". "Weakened" is about a man on his deathbed. In a review for Flood Magazine, Giliann Karon considered the song to be the most effective capsulation of what Wagner wanted to achieve with the album. John Alan Urquhart of PopMatters likened its lyrics to film instructions, highlighting as an example a couplet wherein the character's "eyes lift[ing] to the window like [being] awakened from a dream". The song's chorus is centered around the repeated phrase, "the weaker souls", and concludes with background vocals singing "I'm a-ready".

Alex Gallacher of KLOF Magazine characterized fourth track "Stella" as "lush minimalism"; Wagner described its composition as dreamlike. The song references "Wabash Cannonball", which is a folk standard about a train which carries the souls of the dead to the afterlife. Mark Moody of Under the Radar compared the song to the work of Woody Guthrie, while Ed Jupp of God Is in the TV and Petridis both opined that the song's melody could have been conceived during any musical era from the 1930s onward. The title track is centered around a guitar figure described by Pitchfork's Sam Sodomsky as "autumnal". The song contains an example of lined-out hymnody, wherein the choirs sing "what the fuck" in response to Wagner muttering the phrase.

"White People" originated from a night when Wagner was listening to a friend's radio broadcast. He derived the title from the song "Night People" by Allen Toussaint, which his friend aired during the program. He composed the lyrics by compiling lines from other songs that were aired, and writing them down in the order in which he heard them. The resulting lyrics, which include criticism of Roman Catholics, were considered subversive by Britt. Sodomsky considered Wagner's vocal delivery to be more "forceful" and "desperate" than elsewhere on the album.

=== Tracks 7–12 ===
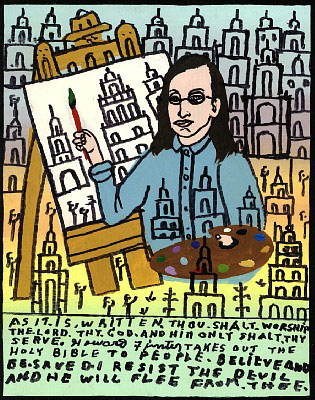
Howard Finster frequently attached text to his portraits (example pictured); one such caption inspired the track "Andrew Jackson Asshat".

"The New World Wave" is set in 1929 and tells a story about a protagonist and his brother during the Great Depression, narrated from the protagonist's point of view. The story includes two parents – Harry and Loretta – and a son, nicknamed "Easy Buckets", who the protagonist's brother considers to be a father figure. The lyrics contain a metaphor about hot dogs. Stephen Deusner of Uncut reported that Wagner wrote the song about his own ancestors; other critics perceived the song as a work of fiction, and described one of the lyrics, "Wow, it just got moody", as breakage of the fourth wall.

"Andrew Jackson Asshat" features a bridge in which the choirs sing a cappella. Wagner wrote the song's lyrics by altering text which was attached to a line drawing of Andrew Jackson by Howard Finster. Jupp regarded its title as political commentary, "showing that country music should not be viewed as always being aligned with US republicanism." Petridis wrote that the lyrics did not explicitly correspond with the political nature of the title: "glancing references to Jesus and the parable of the rich man and Lazarus suggest someone posthumously suffering in hell." The version of "Afterburner" which is present on Punching the Clown differs from that which was included on Passages, the latter being more lo-fi than the former. Sodomsky likened the introductory solo to a gondola lift. The song's lyrics address hopelessness in times of political turmoil: "We're so broke, we can't even pay attention".

"Cigar" is another example of political commentary, with a verse that advocates for the well-being of working immigrants. Another lyric namechecks the fictional detective Johnny O'Clock from the eponymous 1947 film; Moody remarked that O'Clock was a substitute for the folk hero, John Henry. The song contains an example of sparingly used electronic effects on the album, closing with a "dubby" echo according to Sodomsky. "To Do" features an a cappella introduction which Wollen compared to Gregorian chants. Its lyrics describe a list of things the narrator wishes to accomplish before dying, including menial endeavors such as "water[ing] the plants" contrasted with ambitious expressions of romance.

Punching the Clown closes with its twelfth track, "No Chicago". Its lyrics consist almost entirely of a list of stops for a tour that some friends of Wagner were doing; the tour had to be canceled after one friend experienced a stroke. Wagner himself is absent until he sings the final line, which is the song's title repeated twice. He intended this as criticism of fans who complain about their cities not being included without caring about what touring musicians endure. After Wagner's vocal, a brief period of silence precedes a choral reprise. He stated that the purposes of the silence were to give listeners time to contemplate the album they had just heard, and to use an Easter egg to surprise people listening to the album via streaming services.

== Commercial performance ==
Punching the Clown charted in several European countries upon its release. It appeared on the national album charts of Scotland, where it debuted and peaked at number 22 on the Scottish Albums Chart; Switzerland, where it debuted and peaked at number 69 on the Swiss Hitparade; and Germany, where it debuted and peaked at number 98 on the Offizielle Top 100. Although it missed the UK Albums Chart, it did enter multiple album component charts in the United Kingdom. It reached the top 10 on the Americana Albums Chart and the Independent Albums Chart, peaking at numbers seven and 10, respectively. Additionally, it peaked at number 16 on Album Downloads; number 17 on the Record Store Chart; number 32 on Albums Sales; and number 33 on Physical Albums.

== Critical reception ==
Professional ratings
Aggregate scores
Source	Rating
AnyDecentMusic?	8.0/10
Metacritic	86/100
Review scores
Source	Rating
Beats Per Minute	81%
The Guardian	4/5 stars
Mojo	4/5 stars
MusicOMH	3.5/5 stars
Pitchfork	8.5/10
PopMatters	9/10
Record Collector	4/5 stars
Spectrum Culture	87%
Uncut	9/10
Under the Radar	8/10 stars

Music critics responded warmly to Punching the Clown. According to the review aggregator website Metacritic, which assigns a weighted mean out of 100 from reviews by mainstream publications, the album received a score of 86 based on 11 reviews, indicating "universal acclaim". Another review aggregator website, AnyDecentMusic?, gave the album an average rating of 8.0 out of 10 based on 13 reviews. Dustin Nelson of Racket considered the album to be among Lambchop's best work, while Britt in their review called it one of the best albums of 2026. Jonathan Bernstein for Rolling Stone and Zivkovic both hailed the album as a "masterpiece". Mojo's Victoria Segal called the album "a knockout". Steven Johnson of MusicOMH offered slightly more reserved plaudits, opining that the album was unlikely to expand the band's fanbase, but was worthwhile for longtime fans and would assuage those whom were alienated by Wagner's experimentation with AutoTune.

Wagner's songwriting and the choral accompaniments were subjects of widespread praise. Multiple authors praised as synergistic the chemistry between the two choirs and Wagner. (Note: Attributed to multiple sources:) Several regarded the choirs' contributions as dexterous and versatile. (Note: Attributed to multiple sources:) Moody congratulated the band for being consistently willing to pursue new artistic directions. Nana Sam of Mxdwn joined Urquhart in viewing that the band had repurposed old art forms in innovative ways. Allan Jones lauded the album as "a thing of spine-tingling hymnal beauty" in his review for Uncut. KEXP's music director, Alex Ruder, exalted the choirs' work as "transcendent". Writing for Bandcamp Daily, which selected Punching the Clown as one of the best albums of the week, J. Edward Keyes praised Lambchop for reinventing themselves while incorporating elements from their early albums. Karon commended Wagner as rough and authentic against the backdrop of "a culture that prizes digital lacquer", contrasting the album with the AI boom of the 2020s.

Walton wrote that the album could only have been made by a band of Lambchop's tenure and steady pace of output; he additionally praised the subtlety of the arrangements and extolled "Weakened" as an "instant classic" song. Atkins complimented the album's vocals, lyrics, unpredictability, and interplay between its performers; he opined that it was the band's "most direct" album since How I Quit Smoking (1996). Sodomsky said that the album rewarded repeated listens; he highlighted "The New World Wave" as a standout track, as well as the album's humor and emotional vulnerability. Petridis and Wollen both declared the album an effective depiction of contemporary American life. Raley praised the album overall, but was mixed towards Wagner's absurdist sense of humor, saying that it worked on "A Doctor in the House" but was less effective on the title track and "The New World Wave".

Critics frequently highlighted "Just West of Nicollet", particularly for its vocal tag. Moody opined that it and "Andrew Jackson Asshat" were two of Lambchop's most beautiful songs. Britt and Urquhart both praised the song as an effective opener to the album. Wollen described the effect of its vocal tag as "jolt[ing] the listener out of the soporific drawl of mundane living". Petridis analyzed sardonic humor in the tag's inclusion, contrasting its sense of creating hype for Punching the Clown against Lambchop's overall low profile. Walton also perceived humor, while additionally finding the tag endearing in the context of the band's unassuming career and effective for its usage in the album's first track. Jupp considered the tag to be entirely superfluous.

Reviewers occasionally singled out "White People" for criticism. Britt lamented the song's vocal stylings and offensive lyrics as incongruous with the rest of the album, and criticized the presence of a song with its title on an album which he said "neglect[ed] the significant influence of lining out on the Black church". Moody called the lyrics "funny", but he also considered them detrimentally less subtle than the rest of the album. Additionally, he felt that Vernon's banjo playing was underused on the song. Conversely, Johnson called the lyrics "striking" and highlighted a line about there being "six million ways to die".

== Track listing ==
All tracks are written by Kurt Wagner and Andrew Broder, except where noted.

Punching the Clown track listing
No.	Title	Writer(s)	Length
1.	"Just West of Nicollet"		5:37
2.	"A Doctor in the House"		3:09
3.	"Weakened"		5:37
4.	"Stella"		3:33
5.	"Punching the Clown"		3:13
6.	"White People"	Wagner	2:53
7.	"The New World Wave"		5:07
8.	"Andrew Jackson Asshat"		5:20
9.	"Afterburner"	Wagner	2:52
10.	"Cigar"	Wagner	2:47
11.	"To Do"	Wagner	2:57
12.	"No Chicago"		4:39

== Personnel ==
Credits are adapted from the liner notes of Punching the Clown.

Lambchop

- Kurt Wagner – vocals
- Andrew Broder – acoustic guitar (all tracks), bass guitar (track 7)

Eau Claire Vocal Sextet

- Andrea Haines – soprano
- Chelsea Helm – mezzo
- Blake Morgan – alto
- Paul Rudoi – tenor
- Samuel Green – baritone
- Chris Foss – bass

London Choir

- Ailsa Campbell – soprano
- Imogen Parry – soprano
- Molly Noon – mezzo
- Lydia Wonham – mezzo
- Christopher Wardle – alto
- Stephanie Dillon – alto
- Euan Williamson – tenor
- Oscar Golden-Lee – tenor
- Oli Martin-Smith – baritone
- Jamie Wright – baritone
- Tom Hartley – bass
- Johnny Howard – bass

Additional musicians

- Blake Morgan – choir direction and arrangements (all tracks)
- Randall Throckmorton (Note: Credited as Randall Thomson) – vocals (all tracks)
- Justin Vernon – banjo (tracks 1–9)
- Tanner Anderson – hurdy-gurdy (tracks 1 and 7)
- L.A. Buckner – castanets (track 3)
- Cole Davis – bass guitar (track 4)
- Isaac Levy – bass guitar (track 5)

Production

- Ryan Olson – production
- Mark Nevers – engineering, mixing

Artwork

- Graham Tolbert – album cover photo
- Ingo Pertramer – sleeve photos
- Ryan Olson – Minneapolis underpass photo
- New Formalists – design

== Charts ==
Weekly chart performance for Punching the Clown
Chart (2026)	Peak position
German Albums (Offizielle Top 100)	98
Scottish Albums (Official Charts)	22
Swiss Albums (Schweizer Hitparade)	69
UK Album Downloads (Official Charts)	16
UK Albums Sales (Official Charts)	32
UK Americana Albums (Official Charts)	7
UK Independent Albums (Official Charts)	10
