= No You Cmon =

Studio album by Lambchop
- Released: 2004
- Genre: Rock
- Label: Merge

Lambchop chronology
Aw Cmon (2004)	No You Cmon (2004)	The Decline of Country and Western Civilization, Pt. 2 (2006)

Professional ratings
Aggregate scores
Source	Rating
Metacritic	79/100
Review scores
Source	Rating
AllMusic	4/5 stars
Blender	4/5 stars
Entertainment Weekly	A−
The Guardian	3/5 stars
Mojo	3/5 stars
The Observer	4/5 stars
Pitchfork	7.6/10
Q	4/5 stars
Spin	B
Uncut	4/5 stars

No You Cmon is a 2004 album by Lambchop. It was recorded and released at the same time as Aw Cmon, and both were released together as a double album pack as well as individually. Lambchop's record label, Merge Records, reported that the group saw these two releases as separate entities, while not dramatically different in style, serving as a sort of conceptual call and response to one another.

The sleeve is a painting by Wayne White, a childhood friend of Kurt Wagner who also provided cover art for Thriller, Nixon, and Aw Cmon by the band.

== Track listing ==
1. "Sunrise" – 4:10
2. "Low Ambition" – 4:40
3. "There's Still Time" – 4:18
4. "Nothing Adventurous Please" – 3:52
5. "The Problem" – 2:27
6. "Shang a Dang Dang" – 3:21
7. "About My Lighter" – 4:51
8. "Under a Dream of a Lie" – 3:44
9. "Jan. 24" – 3:13
10. "The Gusher" – 3:50
11. "Listen" – 5:41
12. "The Producer" – 3:13
