= Is a Woman =

Studio album by Lambchop
- Released: February 19, 2002
- Recorded: January–July 2001; Nashville
- Genre: Alternative country
- Length: 61:30
- Label: Merge / City Slang / Virgin
- Producer: Mark Nevers, Kurt Wagner

Lambchop chronology
Tools in the Dryer (2001)	Is a Woman (2002)	Aw Cmon (2004)

Professional ratings
Aggregate scores
Source	Rating
Metacritic	79/100
Review scores
Source	Rating
AllMusic	4/5 stars
Alternative Press	8/10
Blender	4/5 stars
The Guardian	4/5 stars
NME	8/10
Pitchfork	5.8/10
Q	2/5 stars
Rolling Stone	3/5 stars
Spin	6/10
Uncut	5/5 stars

Is a Woman is the sixth studio album by American rock band Lambchop. Its combination of austere arrangements and minimalist instrumentation marks a transition from former albums' elaborate and lavish sound.

In late 2010 Lambchop performed this album in its entirety, live on stage at a number of venues throughout Europe.

== Track listing ==
All songs written by Kurt Wagner, except "Caterpillar" written by D.C. Book and Kurt Wagner.

1. "The Daily Growl" – 6:36
2. "The New Cobweb Summer" – 6:57
3. "My Blue Wave" – 7:52
4. "I Can Hardly Spell My Name" – 3:24
5. "Autumn's Vicar" – 4:16
6. "Flick" – 5:07
7. "Caterpillar" – 6:19
8. "D. Scott Parsley" – 5:57
9. "Bugs" – 5:43
10. "The Old Matchbook Trick" – 4:41
11. "Is a Woman" – 4:38

=== Limited edition bonus disc ("Is a Bonus") ===
1. "This Corrosion" (Andrew Eldritch) – 6:12
2. "Backstreet Girl" (Mick Jagger, Keith Richards) – 4:32
3. "Uti" (Kurt Wagner) – 4:51

== Personnel ==
- Allan Lowrey – percussion, drums
- Scott Chase – percussion
- Tony Crow – piano, acetone, juno, homo machine
- Alex McManus – electric guitar, acoustic guitar
- Jonathan Marx – juno, sampler
- Marky Nevers – space guitar, noise guitar, acetone
- William Tyler – acoustic guitar, electric guitar, acetone
- Paul Burch jr. – vibes, snare, shaker, brushed snare
- Kurt Wagner – vocal, guitar, moog, acetone, casio
- Marc Trovillion – bass
- Matt Swanson – bass
- Paul Niehaus – electric guitar, steel guitar
- Rob Stanley – acoustic guitar
- Terry Baker – drums, percussion
- Tammy Pierce – background vocals
- Lisa Crabtree – background vocals
- John Delworth – acetone, juno
- Deanna Varagona – baritone saxophone
- Curtiss Pernice – acoustic guitar

== Charts ==
Chart (2002)	Peak position
French Albums (SNEP)	58
German Albums (Offizielle Top 100)	43
Belgian Albums (Ultratop Flanders)	50
Norwegian Albums (VG-lista)	17
UK Albums (OCC)	38
