= Two Dogs (disambiguation) =

"Two Dogs" was a lemon-based alcopop.

Two Dogs may also refer to:

- Dan "Two Dogs" Hampton, a retired United States Air Force Lieutenant Colonel
- Two Dogs, a character in the John Brunner novel Times Without Number
- Two Dogs, a 1891 painting by Pierre Bonnard
- "Two Dogs, a song by Bob Geldof
- "Two Dogs", a 1992 song by Chocolate USA from All Jets Are Gonna Fall Today
- "Two Dogs, a 2002 song by The Bruces from The War of the Bruces
- "Two Dogs", a 2020 song by Moses Sumney from Græ
- Two Dogs, a 2017 album by Popa Chubby
