= This (Is What I Wanted to Tell You) =

Studio album by Lambchop
- Released: March 22, 2019
- Recorded: January–July 2018
- Studios: Battle Tapes, Nashville
- Genres: Indietronica, electronica
- Length: 45:29
- Labels: Merge, City Slang

Lambchop chronology
FLOTUS (2016)	This (Is What I Wanted to Tell You) (2019)	Trip (2020)

This (Is What I Wanted to Tell You) is the thirteenth studio album by American band Lambchop, released on March 22, 2019. The album placed at No. 50 on Mojo's albums of the year list.

== Reception ==
Professional ratings
Aggregate scores
Source	Rating
AnyDecentMusic?	7.7/10
Metacritic	82/100
Review scores
Source	Rating
AllMusic	4/5 stars
Exclaim!	8/10
The Guardian	4/5 stars
The Music	4/5 stars
Pitchfork	8.1/10
Uncut	4/5 stars
Under the Radar	5/10

The album received largely positive reception. Review aggregator AnyDecentMusic? gave the album a score of 7.7/10 based on 15 ratings, while Metacritic gave the album a score of 82/100 based on 13 reviews indicating "universal acclaim".

== Track listing ==
All tracks are written by Matthew McCaughan & Kurt Wagner unless otherwise indicated.

No.	Title	Writer(s)	Length
1.	"The New Isn’t So You Anymore"		5:18
2.	"Crosswords, or What This Says About You"		6:46
3.	"Everything for You"	Kurt Wagner	3:55
4.	"The Lasting Last of You"		6:08
5.	"The Air Is Heavy and I Should Be Listening to You"		7:40
6.	"The December-ish You"	Kurt Wagner	6:19
7.	"This Is What I Wanted to Tell You"		6:45
8.	"Flower"	Kurt Wagner	2:38

== Personnel ==
Personnel differs between tracks but includes the group members of Lambchop.

- Roy Agee - Trombone
- Tony Crow - Piano, Electric piano
- Robbie Crowell - Horn
- Spencer Cullum - Steel guitar
- Jeremy Ferguson - Engineer, Producer, Synthesizer
- Jeremy Fetzer - Guitar
- Matthew McCaughan - Composer, Drums, Percussion, Synthesizer
- Charlie McCoy - Harmonica, Vibraphone
- Joe Puleo - Vocal Samples
- Matt Swanson - Bass guitar
- Jacob Valenzuela - Trumpet
- Kurt Wagner - Composer, Guitar, Piano, Producer, Vocals
