= Aw Cmon =

Studio album by Lambchop
- Released: February 9, 2004
- Recorded: 2003; The Beech House, Nashville, TN
- Genre: Rock
- Label: Merge
- Producer: Mark Nevers, Kurt Wagner

Lambchop chronology
Is a Woman (2002)	Aw Cmon (2004)	No You Cmon (2004)

Professional ratings
Aggregate scores
Source	Rating
Metacritic	80/100
Review scores
Source	Rating
AllMusic	4/5 stars
Blender	4/5 stars
Entertainment Weekly	A−
The Guardian	4/5 stars
Mojo	4/5 stars
The Observer	4/5 stars
Pitchfork	7.4/10
Q	4/5 stars
Spin	B
Uncut	4/5 stars

Aw Cmon is a 2004 album by Lambchop. It was recorded and released at the same time as No You Cmon, and both were released together as a double album pack as well as individually. Lambchop's record label, Merge Records, report that the group saw these two releases as separate entities, while not dramatically different in style, serving as a sort of conceptual call and response to one another.

The sleeve is a painting by Wayne White a childhood friend of Kurt Wagner who also provided cover art for Thriller, Nixon, and No You Cmon by the band.

== Track listing ==
All songs written by Kurt Wagner, except where noted.

1. "Being Tyler" (Wagner, William Tyler) – 3:19
2. "Four Pounds in Two Days" – 2:04
3. "Steve McQueen" – 4:32
4. "The Lone Official" – 3:43
5. "Something's Going On" – 2:45
6. "Nothing But a Blur from a Bullet Train" – 3:58
7. "Each Time I Bring It Up It Seems to Bring You Down" – 4:25
8. "Timothy B. Schmidt" – 3:05
9. "Women Help to Create the Kind of Men They Despise" (Wagner, Tyler) – 2:29
10. "I Hate Candy" – 4:48
11. "I Haven't Heard a Word I've Said" – 4:04
12. "Action Figure" – 5:31
