= Thriller (Lambchop album) =

Studio album by Lambchop
- Released: September 23, 1997
- Genre: Rock
- Label: Merge
- Producer: Robb Earls & Kurt Wagner

Lambchop chronology
How I Quit Smoking (1996)	Thriller (1997)	What Another Man Spills (1998)

Professional ratings
Review scores
Source	Rating
Allmusic	4/5 stars
NME	5/10
Pitchfork Media	(8.0/10)
Uncut	5/5 stars

Thriller is the third full-length album by Lambchop, released in 1997.

The album title was chosen as a reference to the Michael Jackson album of the same name, one of the biggest-selling albums of all time, as an in-joke by frontman Kurt Wagner regarding the low sales of the first two Lambchop albums.

The track "Your Fucking Sunny Day" was released as a single from the album in a re-recorded "clean" version, under the title "Your Sucking Funny Day".

Three of the songs, "Hey Where's Your Girl", "Crawl Away" and "Superstar in France" are cover versions of songs from the album Poor Fricky by East River Pipe also released on Merge Records.

The sleeve is a painting by Wayne White, a childhood friend of Wagner who also provided cover art for Nixon, Aw Cmon and No You Cmon by the band.

== Track listing ==
1. "My Face Your Ass" (Kurt Wagner, Donald Charles Book)
2. "Your Fucking Sunny Day" (Kurt Wagner)
3. "Hey Where's Your Girl" (F.M. Cornog)
4. "Crawl Away" (F.M. Cornog)
5. "Gloria Leonard" (Kurt Wagner)
6. "Thriller" (Kurt Wagner, Robb Earls)
7. "The Old Fat Robin" (Kurt Wagner)
8. "Superstar in France" (F.M. Cornog)
