= You & I Are Earth =

Studio album by Anna B Savage
- Released: January 24, 2025
- Length: 31:22
- Label: City Slang
- Producer: John "Spud" Murphy

Anna B Savage chronology
In Flux (2023)	You & I Are Earth (2025)

You & I Are Earth (stylized You & i are Earth) is the third studio album by English singer-songwriter Anna B Savage. It was released on 24 January 2025, via City Slang and produced by John "Spud" Murphy.

== Background ==
The first single from the album is titled "Agnes", which features Irish singer Anna Mieke.

== Reception ==
Professional ratings
Review scores
Source	Rating
AllMusic	3.5/5 stars
Far Out	3.5/5 stars
Under the Radar	8/10 stars

The album was described by Far Out as "an open diary entry, an ode to Ireland, and a love letter to soulmates, all wrapped in one."

Under the Radar rated the album 8 out of 10, stating it is "full of love songs, both to a person and to Ireland (her home of the last several years), and it's a joyful thing to hear the peaceful contentment and sense of wonder that emanates from Savage across the record's 10 songs."

MusicOMH stated it "never feels rushed or slight. There’s a kind of glow to many of its tracks and it’s that glow which gives this record its own power."

== Track listing ==
All tracks are written by Anna B Savage.

You & I Are Earth
No.	Title	Length
1.	"Talk to Me"	3:34
2.	"Lighthouse"	4:14
3.	"Donegal"	3:24
4.	"Big & Wild"	1:36
5.	"Mo Cheol Thú"	4:50
6.	"Incertus"	0:56
7.	"I Reach for You in My Sleep"	3:42
8.	"Agnes" (featuring Anna Mieke)	3:47
9.	"You & I Are Earth"	2:56
10.	"The Reset of Our Lives"	2:23
Total length:		31:25

== Personnel ==
- Anna B Savage – lead vocals (all tracks), guitar (tracks 1–3, 6)
- John "Spud" Murphy – production, mixing
- Harvey Birrell – mastering
- Kate Ellis – cello (tracks 1–3, 5–10)
- Cormac MacDiarmada – violin (tracks 1, 3, 4, 6–10)
- Caimin Gilmore – double bass (tracks 2, 3, 5–10)
- Joe Taylor – drums (tracks 2, 3, 5, 7–10), piano (5)
- Brian Dillon – keyboards (tracks 2, 3, 5, 7, 9, 10)
- Anna Mieke – lead vocals (track 8)
