= Showtunes (Lambchop album) =

Studio album by Lambchop
- Released: May 21, 2021
- Length: 31:06
- Labels: Merge; City Slang
- Producer: Jeremy Ferguson

Lambchop chronology
Trip (2020)	Showtunes (2021)	The Bible (2022)

Singles from Showtunes
- 1. "A Chef's Kiss" Released: March 16, 2021; 2. "Fuku" Released: April 12, 2021; 3. "The Last Benedict" Released: May 18, 2021

Showtunes is the fifteenth studio album by American rock band Lambchop. It was released on May 21, 2021, on Merge Records in the United States and on City Slang elsewhere.

== Background ==
The songs on Showtunes were initially meant to be performed live at Eaux Claire by Lambchop, with help from Twit One, Andrew Broder, and Ryan Olson. After the festival was cancelled due to COVID-19, Wagner decided to finish these songs in studio.

Showtunes was recorded remotely by Kurt Wagner, the only permanent member of Lambchop. It features as collaborators James McNew of Yo La Tengo, who contributed double bass; CJ Camerieri, who contributed horns and horn arrangements; Jeremy Ferguson, who acted as co-producer and engineer, and Twit One, who co-wrote the track "Fuku".

Unlike Lambchop's previous work, on which Wagner played guitar, Showtunes features Wagner's guitar tracks converted into MIDI piano. Showtunes takes inspiration from musical theatre, hence the name; Wagner called it "show tunes for people who don't like show tunes".

Three singles were released in advance of the album: "A Chef's Kiss", on March 16, 2021; "Fuku", on April 12, 2021, along with an accompanying music video directed by Doug Anderson; and "The Last Benedict", on May 18, 2021.

== Critical reception ==
Professional ratings
Aggregate scores
Source	Rating
AnyDecentMusic?	7.7/10
Metacritic	79/100
Review scores
Source	Rating
AllMusic	3.5/5 stars
The Arts Desk	3/5 stars
Beats Per Minute	78%
God Is in the TV	10/10
Loud and Quiet	9/10
musicOMH	4/5 stars
Mojo	4/5 stars
The Observer	4/5 stars
Pitchfork	7.4/10
PopMatters	7/10
Spectrum Culture	80%
Under the Radar	7.5/10 stars
Uncut	8/10

The album was released to positive reviews from music critics, garnering a score of 79 out of 100 on the review aggregator website Metacritic based on nine reviews, indicating "generally favourable reviews", and a score of 7.7/10 from review aggregator website AnyDecentMusic? based on 10 reviews.

== Track listing ==
Showtunes track listing
No.	Title	Length
1.	"A Chef's Kiss"	3:46
2.	"Drop C"	3:24
3.	"Papa Was a Rolling Stone Journalist"	2:01
4.	"Fuku"	7:07
5.	"Unknown Man"	4:25
6.	"Blue Leo"	3:05
7.	"Impossible Meatballs"	3:11
8.	"The Last Benedict"	4:07
Total length:		31:06

== Charts ==
Chart performance for Showtunes
Chart (2021)	Peak position
German Albums (Offizielle Top 100)	75
Scottish Albums (Official Charts)	24
UK Independent Albums (Official Charts)	8
