= Temet =

Studio album by Imarhan
- Released: 2018
- Genre: Desert blues, world
- Label: City Slang

Imarhan chronology
Imarhan (2016)	Temet (2018)	Aboogi (2022)

Temet is the second studio album by Tuareg band Imarhan, released on the German City Slang label in 2018. A reviewer for the Financial Times wrote that the album was full of "fiery, bluesy political tunes". The album was recorded in Paris.

== Tracklist ==
No.	Title	Writer(s)	Length
1.	"ⴵⵣⵣⴵⵎⴵⵏ (Azzaman)"	Eyadou Ag Leche	3:59
2.	"Tamudre"	Imarhan and Eyadou Ag Leche	4:11
3.	"Ehad Wa Dagh"	Imarhan	2:38
4.	"Alwa"	Imarhan	3:44
5.	"Imuhagh"	Imarhan and Eyadou Ag Leche	4:49
6.	"Tumast"	Imarhan	3:46
7.	"Tarha Nam"	Imarhan	5:05
8.	"Tochal"	Imarhan and Eyadou Ag Leche	3:57
9.	"Zinizjumegh"	Mohammed Ag Itlale a/k/a Japonais and Imarhan	4:53
10.	"Ma S-Abok"	Imarhan	4:14
