= A Common Turn =

Studio album by Anna B Savage
- Released: 29 January 2021
- Length: 47:02
- Label: City Slang

Singles from A Common Turn
- 1. "Chelsea Hotel #3" Released: 18 February 2020; 2. "Dead Pursuits" Released: 22 June 2020; 3. "A Common Tern" Released: 29 September 2020; 4. "Corncrakes" Released: 10 November 2020; 5. "Baby Grand" Released: 19 January 2021

Professional ratings
Aggregate scores
Source	Rating
AnyDecentMusic?	7.9/10
Metacritic	81/100
Review scores
Source	Rating
Beats Per Minute	81%
Clash	8/10
God Is in the TV	9/10
The Line of Best Fit	7/10
Loud and Quiet	8/10
MusicOMH	4.5/5 stars
Spectrum Culture	4/5 stars

A Common Turn is the debut studio album by English singer-songwriter Anna B Savage. It was released on 29 January 2021 by City Slang.

== Release ==
Savage announced the release of her debut studio album on 29 September 2020.

=== Singles ===
Savage released "Chelsea Hotel #3", the first single from the album, on 18 February 2020. The single is Savage's first release in five years.

On 22 June 2020, the second single "Dead Pursuits" was released. It was produced by William Doyle. A music video was released along with it that features a "hand-drawn animated video by the artist Carolina Aguirre. Anna said of the single: "This song means a hella lot to me. It felt like the turning point, the straw that broke the camel's back of my writers block and made me able to write my album. It came out of losing sight of who I was in a relationship and also the realisation that I defined myself by my work and music and they certainly weren't going well."

The third single "A Common Tern" was released on 29 September 2020. In a press release, Savage explained the difference between the single and the album title: "When I saw the terns, I was pretty amazed: they really did seem like they were just suspended, dangling on the bottom of a thread. Something about that seeming captivity, being on the end of an invisible line, then breaking free. They were at once familiar and yet so strange and weird. I don’t think I entirely grasped the relevance while I was writing it but now it seems very, very frickin obvious. I spent a year and a half after the tern incident trying to extricate myself from the relationship, bit by bit, section by section. It was fucking hard work, and I did do a lot of apologising. For me, a common turn means the common moment where you decide you just don't/ can't love someone any more, and there's nothing any of you can do about it."

The fourth single "Corncrakes" was released on 10 November 2020. Beats Per Minute described the single as "a quietly brooding track – at least to begin with. With presence, musical style and lucidity of language that recalls Nick Drake, Anna B Savage immediately draws you into her turmoil, her voice as powerful as her words are vulnerable. Jumping from her rich lower register into a gliding falsetto, it’s impossible not to be captivated by the stunning "Corncrakes". The song was written after Savage had read The Outrun by Amy Liptrot and The Summer Book by Tove Jansson.

On 19 January 2021, Savage released the fifth single "Baby Grand". The single shares its title with a short film Savage had been working on with her ex-boyfriend and filmmaker Jem Talbot.

== Critical reception ==
A Common Turn was met with "universal acclaim" reviews from critics. At Metacritic, which assigns a weighted average rating out of 100 to reviews from mainstream publications, this release received an average score of 81 based on 7 reviews. AnyDecentMusic? gave the release a 7.9 out of 10 based on 9 reviews.

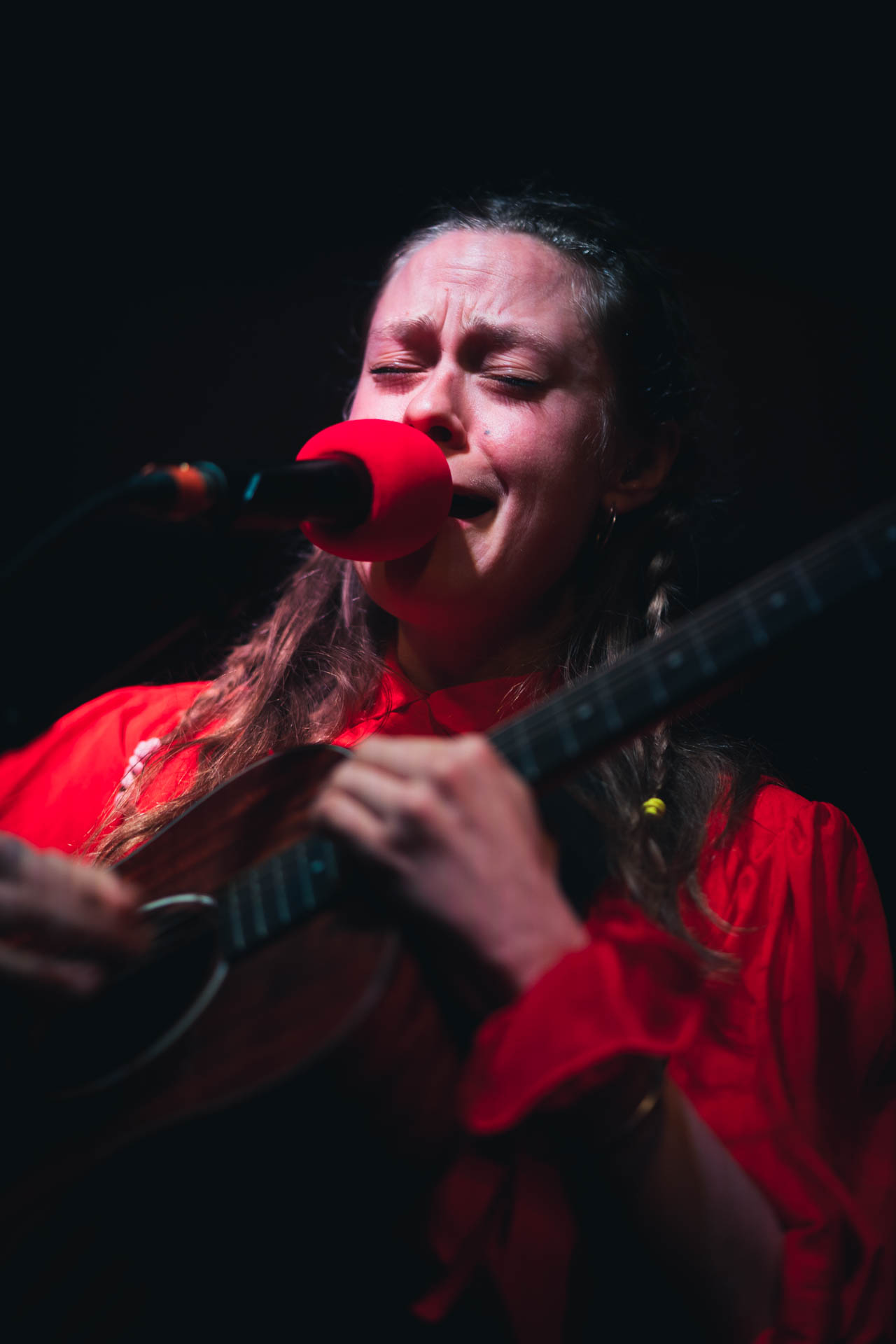
Anna B Savage singing (at Rough Trade in 2023)

In a review for Beats Per Minute, Rob Hakimian wrote: "Having a voice as rich and immediately captivating as Savage does is one thing, but knowing how to deploy it is where she excels. Songs about the trials of sexual relationships are what many will likely come into this album expecting. A Common Turn is at its best when Savage is purely focused on herself, plumbing the depths of her psyche and existential angst." Jamie Wilde of Clash explained: "This is a gem of an album. Personal, honest and highly emotive, it tackles big questions; but most of all, it dares to be vulnerable. A Common Turn is undoubtedly one of the most notable releases of 2021 so far, marking a very impressive and well-earned return to music for Anna B Savage." Dan Cromb of The Line of Best Fit said: "A Common Turn serves as an excellent commentary on modern life, with some intensely personal struggles that others might be wary of sharing, lined up and forensically examined. The instrumentation is sparse where it needs to be, opening up space for Savage to trade on the richness of her voice. There are moments, however, such as on "Corncrakes", where the strumming of guitars reaches an almost frenzied level."

Writing for The Quietus, Laviea Thomas reviewed the album: "In this ten-track whirlwind, Savage dives deep as she aligns herself with the earth, flickering microscopic changes as the softness of her vocals float you between fantasy and reality. Humble, translucent and just simply mesmerising, in A Common Turn you get to see Savage at her most vulnerable – and, ironically, at her strongest yet. Sculpted over the last three years, A Common Turn is the perfect accumulation of Savage's best work, assisted with the assistance of singer-songwriter William Doyle – who helped towards some of the production."

== Track listing ==
A Common Turn track listing
No.	Title	Length
1.	"A Steady Warmth"	1:36
2.	"Corncrakes"	3:43
3.	"Dead Pursuits"	4:19
4.	"BedStuy"	5:06
5.	"Baby Grand"	5:16
6.	"Two"	5:09
7.	"A Common Tern"	4:47
8.	"Chelsea Hotel No. 3"	5:03
9.	"Hotel"	6:47
10.	"One"	5:16
