= FLOTUS (album) =

Studio album by Lambchop
- Released: November 4, 2016
- Studios: Battle Tapes Recording, Nashville
- Genres: Indietronica, electronica
- Length: 68:46
- Labels: Merge (US, CA), City Slang (Europe)
- Producers: Kurt Wagner, Jeremy Ferguson

Lambchop chronology
| Mr M (2012) | FLOTUS (2016) | This (Is What I Wanted to Tell You) (2019) |

Professional ratings
Aggregate scores
| Source | Rating |
|---|---|
| AnyDecentMusic? | 8.0/10 |
| Metacritic | 83/100 |
Review scores
| Source | Rating |
| AllMusic | 4/5 stars |
| The A.V. Club | B+ |
| The Guardian | 4/5 stars |
| The Independent | 5/5 stars |
| Mojo | 4/5 stars |
| The Observer | 4/5 stars |
| Pitchfork | 8.0/10 |
| Q | 4/5 stars |
| Record Collector | 4/5 stars |
| Uncut | 8/10 |

FLOTUS ("FLOTUS", an acronym for "For Love Often Turns Us Still") is the twelfth studio album by American band Lambchop, released on November 4, 2016. It marked a significant stylistic departure for the group into more electronic-influenced territory, as heard by the instrumental emphasis on synthesizers and the Auto-Tune effects applied to singer-songwriter Kurt Wagner's voice.

== Accolades ==
| Publication | Accolade | Year | Rank | Ref. |
|---|---|---|---|---|
| American Songwriter | Top 50 Albums of 2016 | 2016 | 31 | |
| Consequence of Sound | Top 50 Albums of 2016 | 2016 | 44 | |
| The Guardian | The Best Albums of 2016 | 2016 | 34 | |
| Mojo | The 50 Best Albums of 2016 | 2016 | 4 | |
| Rough Trade | Albums of the Year | 2016 | 48 | |

== Track listing ==
1. "In Care of 8675309" (Kurt Wagner) – 11:51
2. "Directions to the Can" (Wagner, Ira Kaplan) – 3:32
3. "FLOTUS" (Wagner) – 3:29
4. "JFK" (Wagner) – 5:32
5. "Howe" (Wagner) – 4:05
6. "Old Masters" (Wagner) – 4:43
7. "Relatives #2" (Wagner) – 5:25
8. "Harbor Country" (Wagner) – 3:26
9. "Writer" (Wagner) – 3:41
10. "NIV" (Wagner) – 4:35
11. "The Hustle" (Wagner, Ryan Norris) – 18:12

== Personnel ==
Adapted from album credits.

- Kurt Wagner – vocals, vocal processing, guitar
- Ryan Norris – guitar, organs, Moog Opus, piano, synthesizers, drum programming
- Tony Crow – piano, electric piano
- Matt Swanson – bass
- Scott Martin – drums, drum programming, MPC 1000

with

- Matt Glassmeyer – clarinet, contra-alto clarinet, tenor saxophone, "buzzaphone", cornet, horn arrangements
- Alicia Bognanno – background vocals on "The Hustle"

Production

- Kurt Wagner – producer, editing, cover painting
- Ryan Norris – editing, additional production on "The Hustle"
- Jeremy Ferguson – producer, recording and mixing engineer
- Sean R. Badum – mixing assistant (at Blackbird Studio, Nashville)
- New Formalists – album design

== Charts ==
| Chart (2016) | Peak position |
|---|---|
| Austrian Albums (Ö3 Austria) | 70 |
| Belgian Albums (Ultratop Flanders) | 51 |
| Belgian Albums (Ultratop Wallonia) | 126 |
| German Albums (Offizielle Top 100) | 66 |
| Irish Albums (IRMA) | 44 |
| Portuguese Albums (AFP) | 40 |
| Scottish Albums (Official Charts) | 43 |
| Swiss Albums (Schweizer Hitparade) | 71 |
| UK Albums (Official Charts) | 51 |
| US Heatseekers Albums (Billboard) | 12 |
