= I Hope You're Sitting Down/Jack's Tulips =

I Hope You’re Sitting Down/Jack’s Tulips

Studio album by Lambchop
- Released: September 19, 1994
- Recorded: 1993–94
- Genre: Rock
- Length: 67:13 (72:06 on City Slang)
- Label: Merge
- Producer: Pus E. Wounds

Lambchop chronology
I Hope You’re Sitting Down/Jack’s Tulips (1994)	How I Quit Smoking (1996)

Professional ratings
Review scores
Source	Rating
AllMusic	3/5 stars

I Hope You're Sitting Down, also known as Jack's Tulips, is the 1994 debut album by Lambchop.

== Track listing ==
1. “Begin” – 3:30
2. “Betweemus” – 5:26
3. “Soaky in the Pooper” – 4:16
4. “Because You Are the Very Air He Breathes” – 6:11
5. “Under the Same Moon” – 4:55
6. “I Will Drive Slowly” – 4:44
7. “Oh, What a Disappointment” – 4:26
8. “Hellmouth” – 2:52
9. “Bon Soir, Bon Soir” – 3:32
10. “Hickey” – 5:51
11. “Breathe Deep” – 4:13
12. “So I Hear You’re Moving” – 3:47
13. “Let’s Go Bowling” – 5:29
14. “What Was He Wearing?” – 3:18
15. “Cowboy on the Moon” – 2:40
16. “Or Thousands of Prizes” – 4:53 (City Slang edition only)
17. “The Pack-Up Song” – 1:53

== Personnel ==
Sourced from AllMusic.

Lambchop

- Kurt Wagner - vocals, guitar
- Paul Niehaus - guitar, trombone, vocals
- Marc William Trovillion - bass
- John Delworth - Farfisa and Hammond organs
- Jonathan Marx - clarinet, alto sax, vocals
- Deanna Varagona - alto sax, banjo, cello, vocals
- Allen Lowrey - drums, percussion
- Scott C. Chase - percussion
