= Cortney Tidwell =

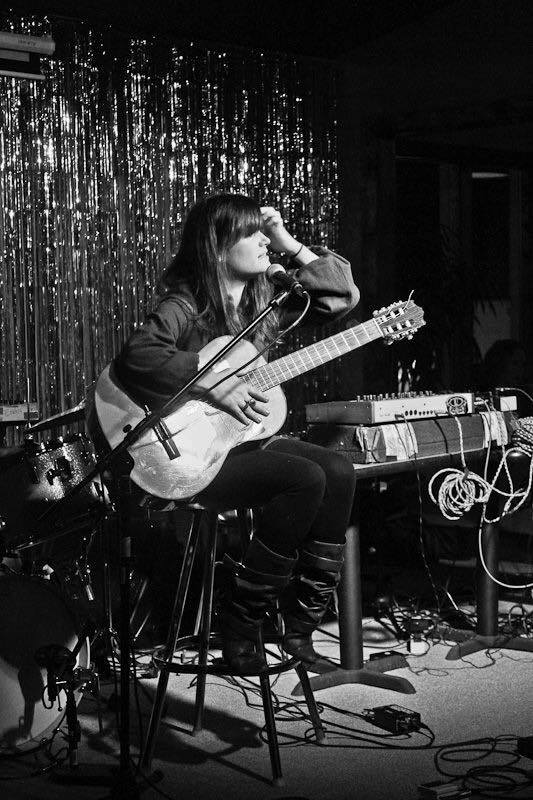
- Cortney Tidwell performs live at The Stone Fox in Nashville, Tennessee.

Background information
- Born: December 2, 1972; Nashville, Tennessee
- Genres: Experimental, Alternative, Electronic
- Occupation(s): singer/songwriter, multi-instrumentalist
- Instrument(s): drums, guitar, omnichord, keyboards
- Years active: 2000–present
- Labels: City Slang, Ever Records (U.K.), Sissybragg Records
- Website: www.myspace.com/cortneytidwell

Cortney Tidwell (born 1972) is an American singer/songwriter and multi-instrumentalist from Nashville, Tennessee. Most of her family were associated with the Grand Ole Opry. She performed in Nashville as a one-woman band and has released four albums.

== Biography ==
Cortney Lara Williamson was born on December 2, 1972, in Nashville, Tennessee, to country singer Connie Eaton and Cliff Williamson, a music producer at A&R. Her paternal grandfather, Slim Williamson, founded and operated country music label Chart Records.

Her maternal grandfather, Robert "Bob" Eaton, was a member of the Grand Ole Opry in the 1950s and was signed to Decca Records. In later years he was a frequent guest on The Ralph Emery Show and was known as "Roadmap Bob". Cortney made her television debut at the age of five on this show, where she sang "I'm Not Lisa" by Jessi Colter, citing Conway Twitty as her favorite country performer.

Most of Tidwell's family played at or were associated with The Grand Ole Opry. Her mother, Connie, a celebrity in Nashville, was friends with musician and producer Jack Clement and wrote songs with him. She collaborated with other musicians such as Townes Van Zandt and Kris Kristofferson and was also a friend of Shel Silverstein.

Tidwell's mother was diagnosed with manic depression in the early 1970s, and by the mid-1980s had withdrawn from the music scene. Attempts were made to discourage Cortney from pursuing a career in music, but she married and started a family while continuing to sing and play guitar.

In 2004, following the death of her mother, Tidwell began recording with her husband Todd Tidwell, a producer, recording engineer and musician who contributed his playing and songwriting to her songs. Tidwell said later that her musical idol was Joni Mitchell. A childhood friend, artist Matthew Zarth, funded the first run of CDs on his label, ‘Sissybragg Records’.

The Nashville scene sang her praises and the late editor Jim Ridley called Tidwell "Nashville’s real songbird". She performed at Springwater, at first with other musicians, but then began playing all the instruments herself while raising her children and working as a preschool teacher. Nashville embraced the new setup with Cortney as a one-woman band, and she caught the attention of Lou Barlow of Sebadoh and opened a show for them.

Tidwell's debut album was released in 2006. A review described her music as rooted in country, with "a mix of electro, indie, blues and jazz" and referred to her "celestial harmonies" and "haunting voice". MOJO described the album as "An exhilarating debut from an irrefutably original new talent”. After its overseas release Tidwell, who had previously only left the US once, toured Europe and the UK.

She has released two full-length LPs and two EPs under her name with City Slang Records. In 2010 she participated in a collaborative album of reimagined songs that were originally recorded for and released by her grandfather's Chart Records in the 1960s, featuring Kurt Wagner, William Tyler, and other members of Lambchop, under the name KORT. She toured Europe with the band.

== Personal life ==
Cortney married Todd Tidwell. They have two sons.

== Discography ==
- Cortney Tidwell EP (2005, Sissybragg Records)
- Don't Let Stars Keep Us Tangled Up (2007, Ever Records)
  - Featuring Kurt Wagner and William Tyler of Lambchop
- Boys (2009, City Slang)
  - Includes "Oh, China," which features a traditional Chinese melody and (indistinct) English vocals
- Invariable Heartache (2010, City Slang) with Kurt Wagner
  - Contains new versions of songs originally recorded for Chart Records
- Clandestine (2012–2014)
