= Mr. M (album) =

Studio album by Lambchop
- Released: February 21, 2012
- Genre: Alternative country
- Label: Merge

Lambchop chronology
OH (Ohio) (2008)	Mr. M (2012)	FLOTUS (2016)

Professional ratings
Aggregate scores
Source	Rating
Metacritic	80/100
Review scores
Source	Rating
Consequence of Sound	4.5/5 stars
Paste	8.1/10
Pitchfork Media	8.3/10
PopMatters	8/10 stars
Slant Magazine	3.5/5 stars

Mr. M is the eleventh studio album by American band Lambchop, released on February 21, 2012. Pitchfork Media ranked Mr. M at No. 50 on its list of the top 50 albums of 2012.

== Track listing ==
1. "If Not I'll Just Die"
2. "2B2"
3. "Gone Tomorrow"
4. "Mr. Met"
5. "Gar"
6. "Nice Without Mercy"
7. "Buttons"
8. "The Good Life (is wasted)"
9. "Kind Of"
10. "Betty's Overture"
11. "Never My Love"
