= The Bible (album) =

Studio album by Lambchop
- Released: September 30, 2022
- Length: 49:48
- Label: Merge

Lambchop chronology
Showtunes (2021)	The Bible (2022)	Punching the Clown (2026)

Singles from The Bible
- 1. "Police Dog Blues" Released: June 16, 2022; 2. "So There" Released: August 9, 2022

Professional ratings
Aggregate scores
Source	Rating
Metacritic	83/100
Review scores
Source	Rating
AllMusic	4/5 stars
American Songwriter	3.5/5 stars
Beats Per Minute	80%
God Is in the TV	9/10
The Line of Best Fit	8/10
MusicOMH	4/5 stars
Paste	7.8/10
Pitchfork	8.1/10
Uncut	9/10
Under the Radar	7.5/10 stars

The Bible is the sixteenth studio album by American band Lambchop. It was released on September 30, 2022, by Merge Records.

== Background ==
On June 16, 2022, Lambchop announced the release of their sixteenth studio album, along with the first single "Police Dog Blues". The music video, directed by Isaac Gale, features an animated clip using the Unreal Engine program.

The second single "So There" was released on August 9, 2022.

== Critical reception ==
The Bible was met with "universal acclaim" reviews from critics. At Metacritic, which assigns a weighted average rating out of 100 to reviews from mainstream publications, this release received an average score of 83, based on 12 reviews.

Writing for Beats Per Minute, Joshua Pickard said: "The Bible is undoubtably one of Lambchop's most mature records, but it is also one of their most honest, most unguarded in its emotional and historical perspectives."

== Track listing ==
The Bible track listing
No.	Title	Length
1.	"His Song Is Sung"	5:28
2.	"Little Black Boxes"	4:43
3.	"Daisy"	5:14
4.	"Whatever, Mortal"	4:21
5.	"A Major Minor Drag"	5:52
6.	"Police Dog Blues"	5:56
7.	"Dylan at the Mousetrap"	4:02
8.	"Every Child Begins the World Again"	3:44
9.	"So There"	5:20
10.	"That's Music"	5:08

== Charts ==
Chart performance for The Bible
Chart (2022)	Peak position
German Albums (Offizielle Top 100)	78
Scottish Albums (Official Charts)	27
Swiss Albums (Schweizer Hitparade)	78
UK Independent Albums (Official Charts)	12
