= How I Quit Smoking =

Studio album by Lambchop
- Released: January 30, 1996
- Recorded: 1995
- Genre: Alternative country
- Length: 52:55
- Label: Merge
- Producer: "Your Starry Eyes"

Lambchop chronology
I Hope You're Sitting Down/Jack's Tulips (1994)	How I Quit Smoking (1996)	Thriller (1997)

Professional ratings
Review scores
Source	Rating
AllMusic	4.5/5 stars
Alternative Press	5/5
Mojo	5/5 stars
NME	8/10

How I Quit Smoking is the second studio album by the American rock band Lambchop, released on January 30, 1996, by Merge Records.

The song "The Man Who Loved Beer" is an adaptation of the poem "The Man Who Was Tired of Life" from the ancient Egyptian text Dispute between a man and his Ba (c. 2000–1700 BC). The song was in turn later covered by David Byrne.

== Track listing ==
All tracks are written by Kurt Wagner, except where noted.

No.	Title	Writer(s)	Length
1.	"For Which We Are Truly Thankful"		2:59
2.	"The Man Who Loved Beer"	Wagner; Donald Charles Book; "Unknown Egyptian, c. 1990 B.C."	2:48
3.	"The Militant"		3:36
4.	"We Never Argue"		4:14
5.	"Life's Little Tragedy"		4:16
6.	"Suzieju"		4:24
7.	"All Smiles and Mariachi"		3:31
8.	"The Scary Caroler"		4:43
9.	"Smuckers"		4:33
10.	"The Militant" (reprise)		2:56
11.	"Garf"		4:31
12.	"Your Life as a Sequel"		4:19
13.	"Theöne"	Wagner; Elton John; Bernie Taupin	4:55
14.	"Again"		1:10
Total length:			52:55

== Personnel ==
Sourced from AllMusic.

Lambchop

- Kurt Wagner - vocals, guitar, classical guitar, electric guitar
- Paul Niehaus - double neck guitar
- John Delworth - Farfisa and Hammond organs
- Jonathan Marx - clarinet, cornet, alto sax, vocals
- Deanna Varagona - alto and baritone saxophones, vocals
- Allen Lowrey - drums
