= What Another Man Spills =

Studio album by Lambchop
- Released: September 8, 1998
- Studio: Masterfonics, Nashville, Tennessee
- Genre: Country; soul
- Label: Merge
- Producer: Mark Nevers

Lambchop chronology
Thriller (1997)	What Another Man Spills (1998)	Nixon (2000)

Professional ratings
Review scores
Source	Rating
AllMusic	4.5/5 stars
The Austin Chronicle	4/5 stars
Los Angeles Times	3/4 stars
Melody Maker	3.5/5 stars
Mojo	4/5 stars
NME	7/10
Pitchfork	8.2/10
Uncut	4/5 stars

What Another Man Spills is the fourth studio album by American rock band Lambchop, released in 1998 by Merge Records. The cover art was drawn by Vic Chesnutt.

== Track listing ==
All songs written by Kurt Wagner except where noted.

1. "Interrupted" - 6:08
2. "The Saturday Option" - 4:38
3. "Shucks" - 5:11
4. "Give Me Your Love (Love Song)" (Curtis Mayfield) - 5:15
5. "Life #2" (F.M. Cornog) - 4:41
6. "Scamper" - 6:21
7. "It's Not Alright" (James McNew) - 3:26
8. "N.O." - 4:26
9. "I've Been Lonely for So Long" (Posie Knight, Jerry Weaver) - 4:40
10. "Magnificent Obsession" - 3:20
11. "King of Nothing Never" (F.M. Cornog) - 4:07
12. "The Theme from the Neil Miller Show" (Marc Trovillion) - 2:45
