= Imarhan =

Algerian rock band

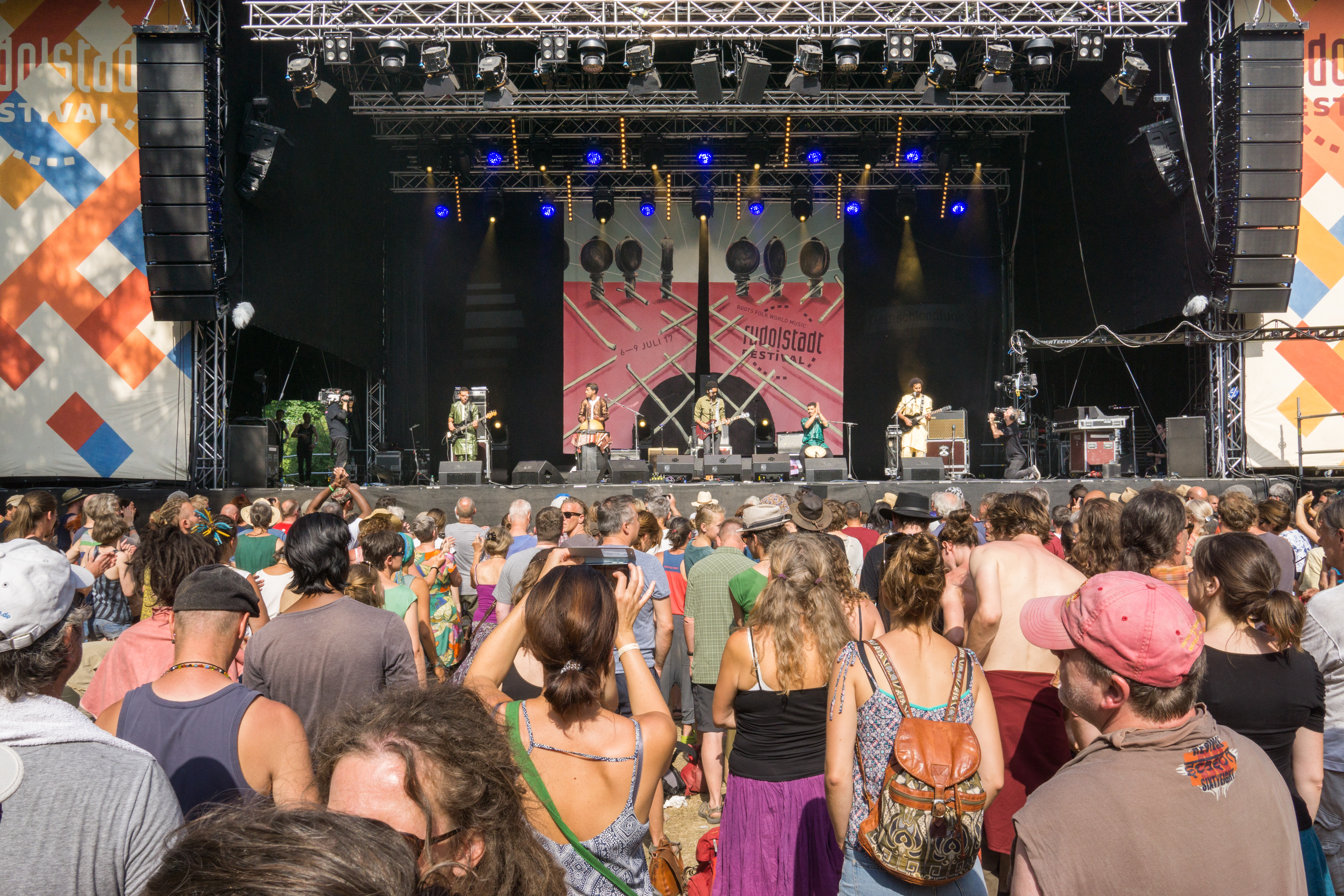
- Imarhan at Rudolstadt-Festival, (2017).

Background information
- Origin: Tamanrasset, Algeria
- Genres: Desert blues
- Years active: 2006–present
- Label: City Slang
- Members: Iyad Moussa Ben Abderahmane "Sadam"; Tahar Khaldi; Hicham Bouhasse; Abdelkader Ourzig; Haiballah Akhamouk

Imarhan is an Algerian Tuareg desert rock quintet formed in 2006, in Tamanrasset, Algeria. Their first three albums were released on German record label City Slang.

The band is formed of vocalist Iyad Moussa Ben Abderahmane (Sadam), bassist Tahar Khaldi, guitarists Hicham Bouhasse and Abdelkader Ourzig, and percussionist Haiballah Akhamouk.

In 2026, they are celebrating their twentieth anniversary by returning with a fourth album, Essam — which means “lightning” in the Tuareg language Tamasheq, recorded at their studio Aboogie. A mainland European tour took place in late 2025 with a 2026 world tour including UK dates.

== Discography ==
=== Studio albums ===
- Imarhan (2016)
- Temet (2018)
- Aboogi (2022)
- Essam (2026)

=== Singles ===
- "Tahabort" (2015)
- "Azzaman" (2017)
- "Ehad wa dagh" (2018)
