= Jakuzi =

Turkish synth-pop band

- Origin: Istanbul, Turkey
- Genres: Synth-pop; dark wave; new wave
- Years active: 2015–present
- Labels: Domuz; City Slang
- Members: Kutay Soyocak; Can Kalyoncu; Meriç Erseçgen; Ahmetcan Gökçeer
- Past members: Taner Yücel
- Website: jakuzi.bandcamp.com

Jakuzi is a Turkish synth-pop band, formed in Istanbul in 2015. The band consists of Kutay Soyocak, Can Kalyoncu, Meriç Erseçgen and Ahmetcan Gökçeer. Kutay Soyocak and Taner Yücel formed the project to move away from their previous punk-oriented music projects. The duo rose to prominence in Istanbul's underground music scene after the release of their debut album Fantezi Müzik. Originally released in 2016 through Domuz Records, it was reissued by City Slang on 24 March 2017.

The band's sound has been described as synth-pop, dark wave and new wave. Jakuzi is influenced by Turkish pop music, as well as genres ranging from krautrock, disco and post-punk. God Is in the TV compared the band's sound to OMD, The Human League and Joy Division.

== Band members ==
- Kutay Soyocak - vocals (2015–present)
- Can Kalyoncu - drums (2016–present)
- Meriç Erseçgen - bass guitar (2017–present)
- Ahmetcan Gökçeer - guitar, synths (2018–present)

== Former members ==
- Taner Yücel - bass guitar, synths, sampler (2015–2017)

== Discography ==
- Fantezi Müzik (2016)
- Hata Payı (2019)
- Madalyon I (2024)
