= Mimi Pond =

American cartoonist and writer

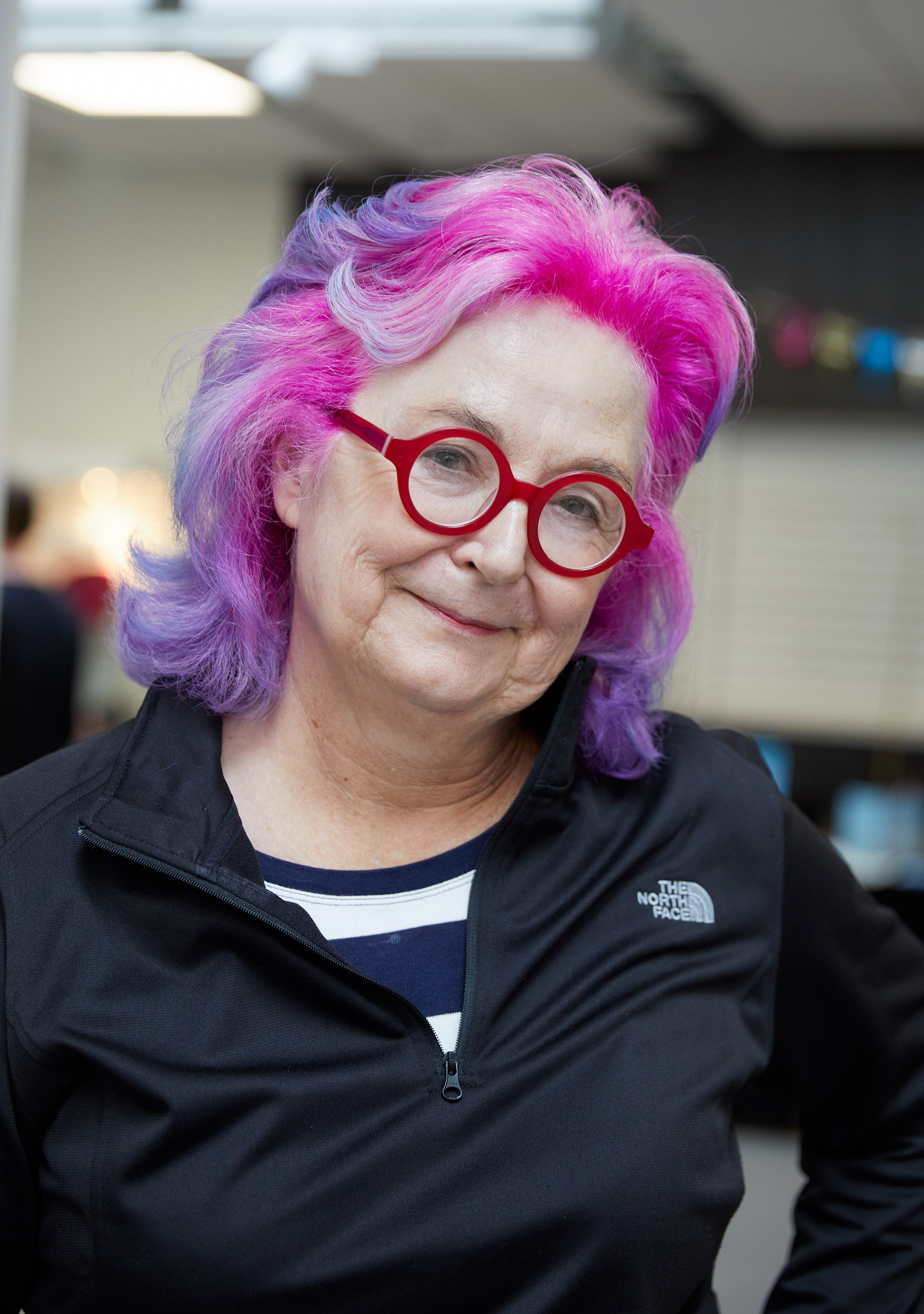
- Pond in 2019
- Born: August 14, 1956 (age 70)
- Occupations: Writer; cartoonist; illustrator
- Spouse: Wayne White
- Writing career
- Language: English
- Genre: Comedy
- Notable work: "Simpsons Roasting on an Open Fire" (writer)
- Notable awards: Inkpot Award (2014)
- Website: mimipond.com

Mimi Pond is an American cartoonist, comics artist, illustrator, humorist, and writer.

== Career and awards ==
Pond spent much of the '80s and '90s writing for television, magazines, and creating cartoons and comic strips for both mediums.

She briefly worked on The Simpsons, writing the first full-length broadcast episode, "Simpsons Roasting on an Open Fire" in 1989, which was nominated for two Emmy awards. Pond, however, did not become a regular member of the writing team, and she alleged it was because Sam Simon, the showrunner at the time, did not want a woman on the team. She is primarily a cartoonist and illustrator and she got her first big break as a weekly cartoonist with Spectator Magazine. Some of her other early work during the 1980s included creating for publications such as, the National Lampoon, The Village Voice, The New York Times, Adweek, and others. She is the author and illustrator of five humor books and currently contributes to the Los Angeles Times. She won the PEN Center USA award for Graphic Literature Outstanding Body of Work, with a special mention for her 2014 graphic novel, Over Easy, for Canadian publisher Drawn & Quarterly. Pond also won an Inkpot Award in 2014 at San Diego Comic-Con, after the release of Over Easy.

Pond has written for Designing Women on CBS and Pee-Wee's Playhouse, as well as being a cartoonist for the Los Angeles Times and other publications. She also wrote a long-running full page comic for Seventeen magazine from the 1980s – 1990s.

Following her book Shoes Never Lie, the Boston Globe described her as "perhaps the leading authority on the spiritual, emotional and visceral connection between women and shoes" (for a story on the shoe collection of Imelda Marcos).

=== Graphic memoirs ===
She has written two graphic memoirs, Over Easy and The Customer is Always Wrong. The two memoirs are loosely based on Pond's own life and sequentially work together as one large story arc. The subject matter is primarily focused on her time as a waitress in Oakland, trying to become a full-time artist after her studies.

==== Over Easy ====
Pond spent over 15 years working on the graphic narrative; the idea had been sitting with her since her time as a waitress in an Oakland, California restaurant during the 1970s. Over Easy is a coming of age story about a young Margaret Pond as she works at Imperial Café, a diner full of hippies and punks in the late 70s. It is in this diner that Margaret makes the transition into 'Madge' and gets a glimpse at adulthood, which includes addiction, confusion, awkward moments, the artist dream, and sexual awakenings. Over Easy encapsulates 1970s Oakland in a witty, slightly fictionalized, memoir of Pond's experiences. The memoir also gained a significant amount of praise from journals and news publications such as, USA Today, The Comics Journal, NPR, Publishers Weekly, The National Post and more.

==== The Customer Is Always Wrong ====
In 2017, Pond released her second graphic memoir and continuation of the narrative in Over Easy. Madge is still working at the vibrant Imperial Café in Oakland, is surrounded by similar misfits in the restaurant, and still has the dream to become an artist. In The Customer Is Always Wrong, Madge finally makes the decision to save up enough money to get out of the West coast and head East to New York where she could pursue her art full-time. The second novel also has a darker tone to it compared to the first part of the story, making the subject matter difficult for Pond to relive as she created the story.

As with Pond's first memoir, The Customer Is Always Wrong was well received by readers. It gained praise from publications and groups such as PEN America, Entertainment Weekly, Vulture and more.

=== Do Admit: The Mitford Sisters & Me ===
On November 22, 2021, an excerpt of Pond's biography on the Mitford sisters was released online. Pond had begun working on it since 2019, but had been thinking about it since she was a child. It was finally published in 2025 by Drawn & Quarterly and Jonathan Cape (United Kingdom). The biography covers the lives of the six Mitford sisters—Nancy, Deborah, Unity, Diana, Jessica, and Pamela—as well as the other members of the aristocratic family, and their geo-political influence on major events of the 1920s and 1930s.

Pond's biography gained praise from publications such as The New York Times, Los Angeles Times, Publishers Weekly and more.

== Personal life ==
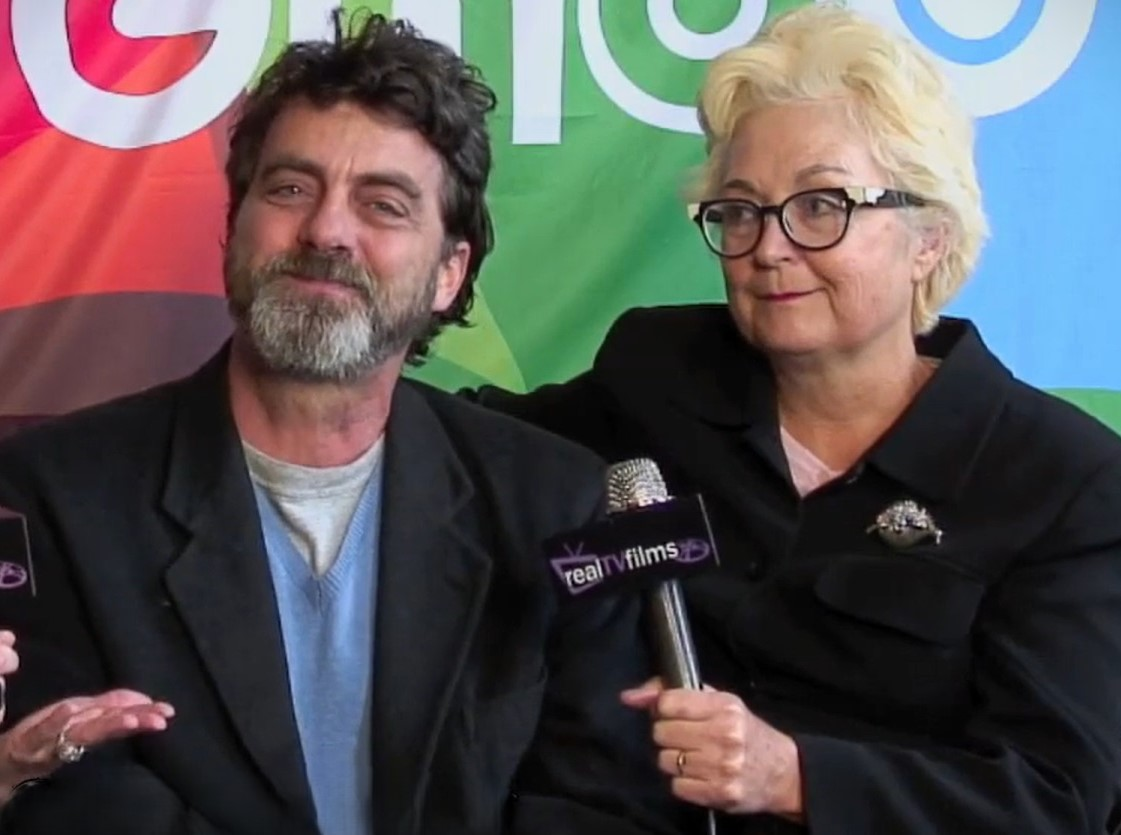
White and Pond in 2012

Pond is married to cartoonist and artist Wayne White. They have two children together, Woodrow and Lulu White, who are both artists.

In the 1970s, Pond worked at Mama's Royal Café in Oakland, CA, which became the inspiration for her graphic memoirs.

=== Education ===
Pond attended the California College of the Arts (CCA), then known as the California College of Arts and Crafts, from 1975-78.

== Bibliography ==
- The Valley Girls' Guide to Life. Dell Publishing Co. 1982. ISBN 978-0-440-59334-8.
- Mimi Pond's Secrets of the Powder Room. Holt, Rinehart, and Winston. 1983. ISBN 978-0-03-063253-2.
- Shoes Never Lie. Berkley Pub Group. 1985. ISBN 978-0-425-08104-4.
- A Groom of One's Own, and Other Bridal Accessories. Penguin USA. 1991. ISBN 978-0-452-26945-3.
- Splitting Hairs: The Bald Truth About Bad Hair Days. Simon & Schuster. 1998. ISBN 978-0-684-82643-1.
- Over Easy. Drawn & Quarterly. 2014. ISBN 978-1-77046-153-6.
- The Customer Is Always Wrong. Drawn & Quarterly. 2017. ISBN 978-1-77046-282-3.
- Do Admit: The Mitford Sisters and Me. Drawn & Quarterly. 2025. ISBN 9781770468047.
