= Damaged (Lambchop album) =

Studio album by Lambchop
- Released: 2006
- Genre: Alternative country
- Label: Merge

Lambchop chronology
The Decline of Country and Western Civilization, Pt. 2 (2006)	Damaged (2006)	OH (Ohio) (2008)

Professional ratings
Aggregate scores
Source	Rating
Metacritic	81/100
Review scores
Source	Rating
AllMusic	4/5 stars
The A.V. Club	B+
Drowned in Sound	8/10
The Guardian	4/5 stars
Mojo	4.5/5 stars
musicOMH	4/5 stars
The Observer	5/5 stars
Pitchfork	6.8/10
PopMatters	9/10
Stylus	A−

Damaged is the ninth studio album by Lambchop, released in 2006.

== Track listing ==
1. "Paperback Bible" – 7:48
2. "Prepared [2]" – 6:03
3. "The Rise and Fall of the Letter P" – 3:36
4. "A Day Without Glasses" – 4:11
5. "Beers Before the Barbican" – 4:51
6. "I Would Have Waited Here All Day" – 4:02
7. "Crackers" – 4:11
8. "Fear" – 5:00
9. "Short" – 3:48
10. "The Decline of Country and Western Civilization" – 4:36

=== Bonus disc ===
1. "Pre" – 5:35
2. "Fear(re)" – 4:30
3. "Decline" – 4:44
4. "Paperback Bible (With Drums)" – 6:04

== Personnel ==
- William Tyler – guitars
- Tony Crow – piano
- Sam Baker – drums
- Matt Swanson – bass
- Kurt Wagner – guitar, vocals
- Alex McManus – guitars
- Deanna Varagona – baritone saxophone
- Paul Niehaus – steel guitar, electric guitar
- Marc Trovilion – electronics
- Jonathon Marx – electronics, sound interludes
- Ryan Norris – keyboards, electronics, sound interludes
- Scott Martin – drums, electronics, sound interludes
- Roy Agee – trombones
- Gary Tussing – cellos
- G daddy – acoustic guitar
- Bruce Colson violins
- Ames Asbell – viola
- Ben Westney – cello
