= Wayne White (artist) =

American art director, painter, printmaker

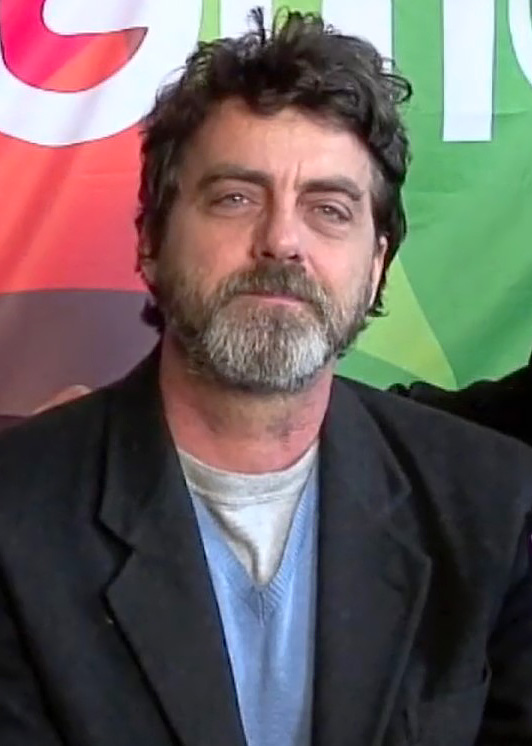
- White in 2012
- Born: Wayne Wilkes White; September 17, 1957 (age 68); Sand Mountain, Alabama U.S.
- Education: Middle Tennessee State University
- Known for: Painting, cinema
- Notable work: Nixon (1998)
- Movement: Surrealism, pop art
- Spouse: Mimi Pond
- Children: 2
- Website: waynewhiteart.com

Wayne Wilkes White (born September 17, 1957) is an American painter, art director, puppeteer, set designer, animator, cartoonist and illustrator. He has won two Emmy Awards for his work.

== Early life and education ==
In the documentary Beauty is Embarrassing, White says he was born in Sand Mountain, Alabama.

After graduating from Hixson High School in Chattanooga, Tennessee (1975) and Middle Tennessee State University (BFA, 1979), White went to New York City (1980) and worked as a cartoonist and illustrator for a number of publications including The East Village Eye, Raw, The New York Times, and The Village Voice.

== Career ==
In 1986 he worked on Pee-wee's Playhouse where his work for his set and puppet designs won two Emmy awards; he also supplied a number of voices on the show. Other television credits include production and set design for Shining Time Station, Riders in the Sky, The Weird Al Show and Beakman's World.

He art directed two seminal music videos, Peter Gabriel's "Big Time" in 1986, for which he won a Billboard award for best Art Direction in a music video, and in 1996 he designed all the Georges Méliès-inspired sets for the award-winning video for the Smashing Pumpkins "Tonight, Tonight".

More recently he has concentrated on his painting career. He takes cheap, mass-produced lithographs which he finds in secondhand thrift stores and painstakingly paints phrases or words on them in a glossy, 3-D style. His works have been compared to Ed Ruscha. White's painting Nixon was featured on the Nixon album cover for the band Lambchop. A school friend of Lambchop's Kurt Wagner, White has contributed to four of the band's album covers. On September 16, 2009 at The Modern Art Museum in Fort Worth, Texas, White gave a presentation of his work through the retelling of his life.

In September 2009 White installed a large puppet head of George Jones in the Rice Gallery at Rice University in Houston, Texas. The puppet's eyes rotate in its head, and if the viewer pulls a rope, the mouth opens and a snoring noise emerges. A huge fan rotates at the base of the head, with the words "dreaming" written over the fan blades. The piece is called "Big Lectric Fan to Keep Me Cool While I Sleep," in reference to George Jones's recording of "Ragged but Right."

In January 2009, White was featured at Marty Walker Gallery in Dallas, Texas in a group art exhibition There's something I've been meaning to tell you.... The Marty Walker Gallery also held a solo exhibition for White in 2010, I fell 37 miles to the earth 100 years ago. In March 2012, Beauty Is Embarrassing, a documentary about Wayne White's life, premiered at SXSW in Austin, Texas. In June 2013 the interactive, site-specific installation HALO AMOK debuted at the Oklahoma City Museum of Art. White describes HALO AMOK as a "cubist cowboy rodeo."

In November 2016 White created an art installation in Chattanooga called Wayne-O-Rama that includes huge cardboard heads of figures from Chattanooga's history, including Dragging Canoe and Adolph Ochs, and a large model of Lookout Mountain featuring details about the mountain including the roadside attractions Rock City, Ruby Falls and the Incline. It was partially funded by the Shaking Ray Levis Society, Benwood Foundation, the Lyndhurst Foundation and See Rock City Inc.

In January 2020, White announced his fourth solo art show at the Joshua Liner Gallery in New York City, and in April 2020, White released a series of eighteen never before seen drawings from 2012 and 2020. This was in conjunction with the debut of a series of short puppet shows that White created for Instagram with each episode containing a short joke or gag produced by White.

White made the cover art, Curdled American Dream, for the X album Alphabetland due to vocalist Exene Cervenka and bassist John Doe both being fans of his work.

White created the cover art and 30 original chapter illustrations for the book Cocaine & Rhinestones: A History of George Jones & Tammy Wynette by Tyler Mahan Coe, published by Simon & Schuster in September 2024. (The book is an adaptation of the second season of the podcast of the same name.) The collaboration on a book is fitting, as several years earlier White and Coe discussed their mutual love of books and country music during a conversation published by Bitter Southerner magazine.

== Wayne White beer ==
Chattanooga Brewing Company introduced their "Wayne White Ale" beer in 2018.

== Personal life ==
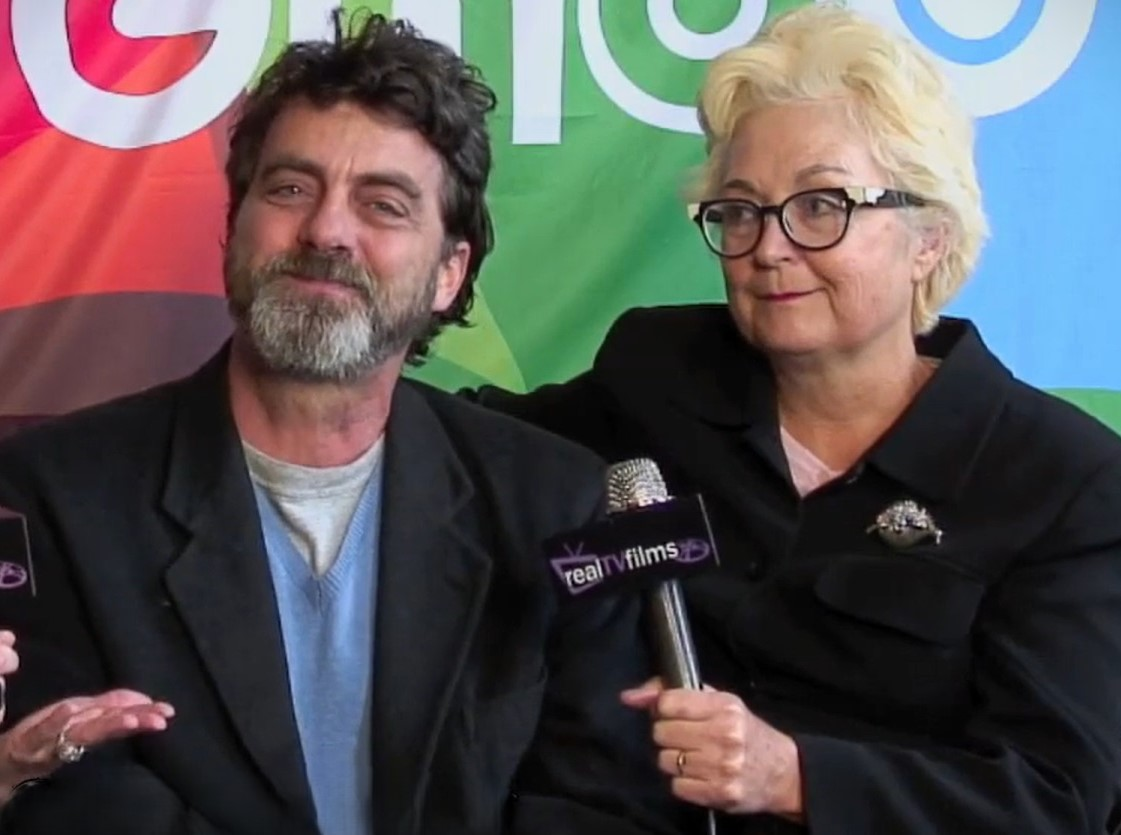
White and Mimi Pond in 2012

White is married to cartoonist and writer Mimi Pond. They have two children, Woodrow "Woody" White and Lulu White, who are also artists themselves.

== Works and publications ==
- White, Wayne (2009). Oldham, Todd; Rakowski, Kelly; Cassity, Matt (eds.). Wayne White: Maybe Now I'll Get the Respect I so Richly Deserve. Los Angeles, CA: Ammo Books. ISBN 978-1-934-42911-2. OCLC 213855083.
- White, Wayne (2010). Wayne White: Big Lectric Fan to Keep Me Cool While I Sleep (Exhibition catalog). Houston, TX: Rice University Art Gallery. ISBN 978-1-932-28137-8. OCLC 949778517. – September 10 – December 13, 2009
- Pagel, David; White, Wayne (2013). Halo Amok: A Puppet Installation by Wayne White (Exhibition catalog). Oklahoma City, OK: Oklahoma City Museum of Art. ISBN 978-0-911-91917-2. OCLC 866857644. – Issued in connection with an exhibition held June 6 – October 6, 2013, Oklahoma City Museum of Art
