= Anna B Savage =

British musical artist

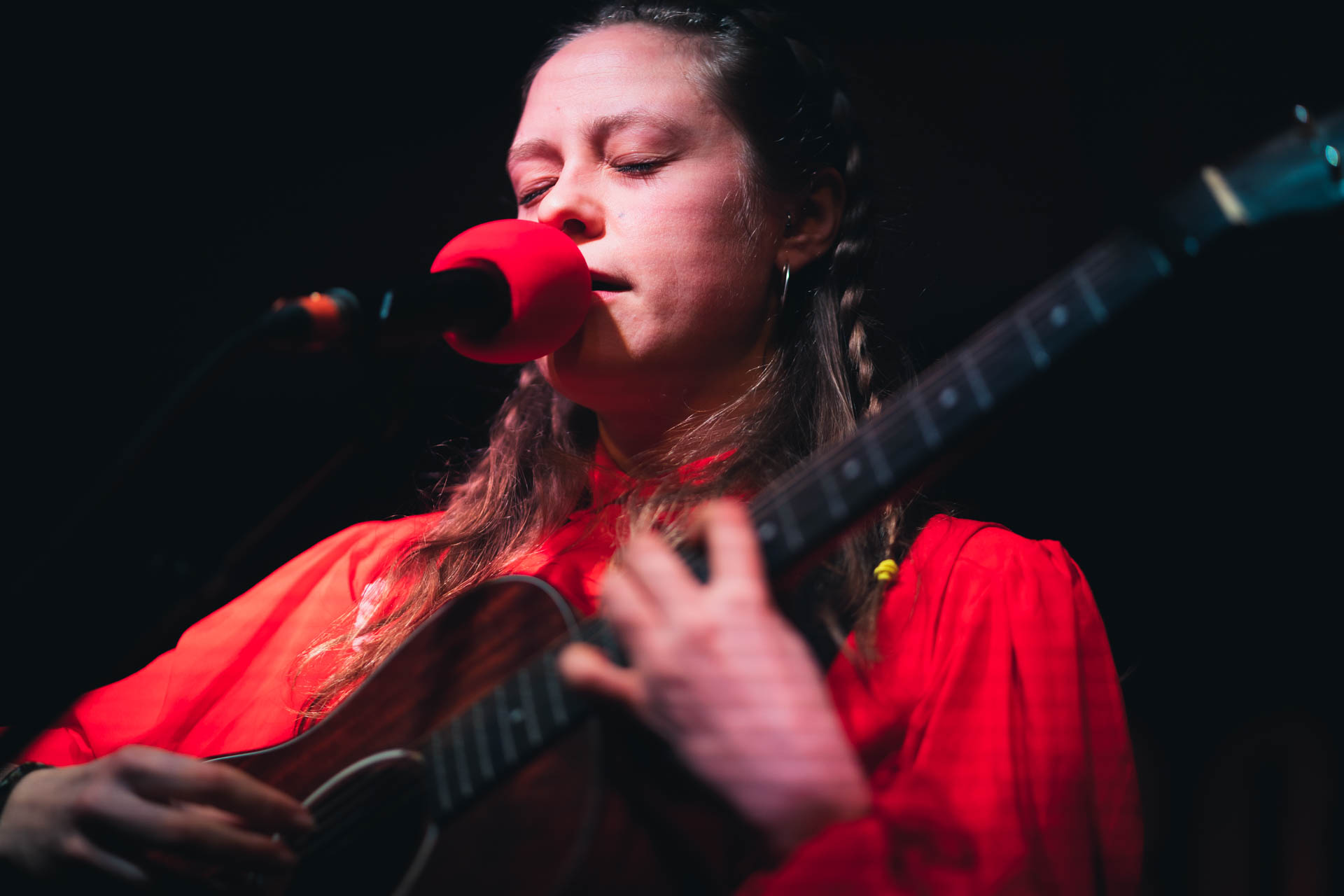
- Anna B Savage

Background information
- Born: London, UK
- Genres: Pop; rock

Anna B Savage is an English singer-songwriter and multi-instrumentalist based in Dublin.

== Career ==
Savage released her debut EP on 1 June 2015, titled EP. In June 2020, she released the single "Dead Pursuits". In January 2021, she released her debut studio album, A Common Turn. In 2022, she released the single "The Ghost", which was produced by Mike Lindsay, and included on her second album. She performed the song live at Village Underground, London, on 28 March 2023.

Her second studio album, In Flux, was released on 17 February 2023. She released her third studio album, You & I Are Earth, on 24 January 2025.

== Personal life ==
Born in London, Savage is the daughter of two classical singers. She described herself as having "low self-esteem and low self-confidence." In 2020, she received a master's degree in music.

== Discography ==
Studio albums

- A Common Turn, City Slang (2021)
- In Flux, City Slang (2023)
- You & I Are Earth, City Slang (2025)

EPs

- EP (2015)
