= Two Dogs (Bonnard) =

Painting by Pierre Bonnard

- Deux Chiens (French)
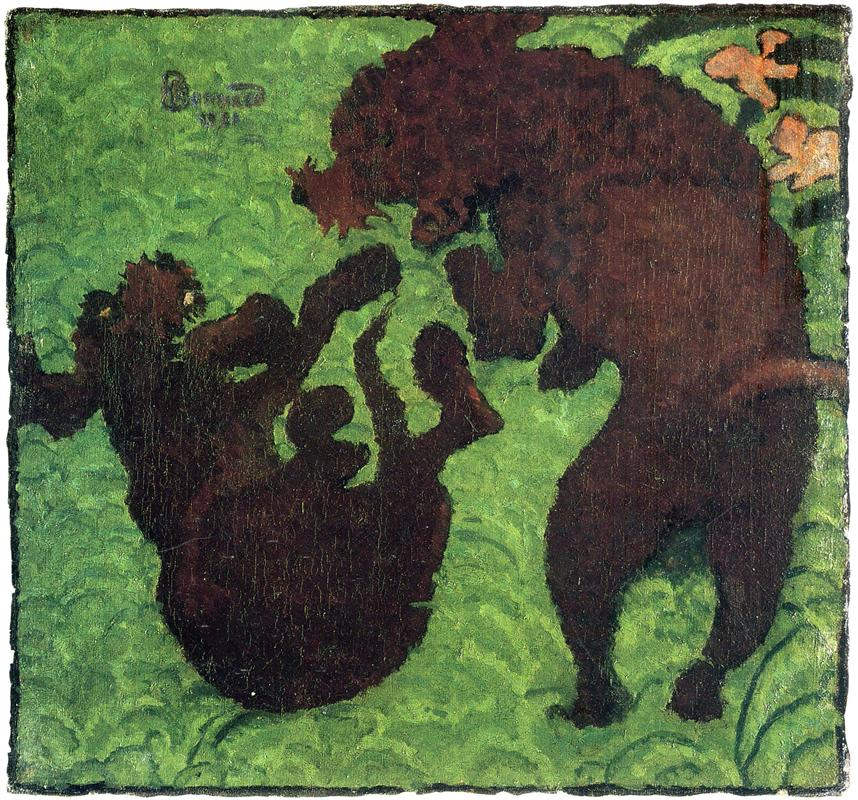
- Artist: Pierre Bonnard
- Year: 1891
- Medium: Oil painting on canvas
- Movement: Post-Impressionism; Nabis
- Dimensions: 36,3 cm × 39.7 cm (143 in × 15.6 in)
- Location: Southampton City Art Gallery, Southampton

Two Dogs (French: Deux Chiens) is an oil-on-canvas painting by the French artist Pierre Bonnard, created in 1891. It is held at the Southampton City Art Gallery, in Southampton.

== History and description ==
In 1891, Bonnard entered a competition to design dining room furniture. Although his project never materialized, Bonnard used an already existing cabinet door design for his painting Two Dogs. The painting depicts two brown poodles playing, one up and other down, both barking, in a green floor, while two flowers can be seen at the right. The poodles may have been modeled on Bonnard's own dog, Ravageau. The simple but expressive composition, as well as the use of several "color blocks" shows the artist's interest in Japanese prints. In this work, along with the painting Study for a Cat (1890), Bonnard tries to use the influence of the Japanese masters and revive pure decorativeness with life impressions. At the same time, dark dogs are often a repetitive and important theme for the artist.

== Provenance ==
In 1963, the painting was given to the Southampton City Art Gallery by the will of the gallery owner and collector Arthur Tilden Jeffress.
