= Tools in the Dryer =

Compilation album by Lambchop
- Released: September 18, 2001September 18, 2001
- Genre: Rock
- Label: Merge

Lambchop chronology
Nixon (2000)	Tools in the Dryer (2001)	Is a Woman (2002)

Professional ratings
Review scores
Source	Rating
AllMusic	4/5 stars
Pitchfork	(6.7/10)

Tools in the Dryer is a 2001 album by Lambchop. It compiles rarities from across the band's career, including early demos and live performances.

== Track listing ==
1. "Nine"
2. "Whitey"
3. "Cigaretiquette"
4. "Miss Prissy"
5. "The Petrified Florist"
6. "Each with a Bag of Fries"
7. "All over the World"
8. "Flowers of Memory"
9. "Scared Out of My Shoes"
10. "Style Monkeys"
11. "The Militant" (Mark Robinson Remix)
12. "Up with People" (Zero 7 Reprise Remix)
13. "Give Me Your Love" (Doppelganger Remix)
14. "Love T.K.O."
15. "Or Thousands of Prizes"
16. "Moody Fucker"
