= The Decline of Country and Western Civilization, Pt. 2 =

Studio album by Lambchop
- Released: 2006
- Genre: Rock
- Label: Merge

Lambchop chronology
No You Cmon (2004)	The Decline of Country and Western Civilization, Pt. 2 (2006)	Damaged (2006)

Professional ratings
Review scores
Source	Rating
AllMusic	3.5/5 stars
Pitchfork Media	(7.2/10)

The Decline of Country and Western Civilization, Pt. 2 is a 2006 album by Lambchop compiling out-takes from their previous albums.

The album was titled "Part 2" because a similar rarities compilation (sharing several of the same tracks) called The Decline of Country and Western Civilization was released in Europe around the same time.

== Track listing ==
1. "My Cliché"
2. "Loretta Lung"
3. "Two Kittens Don't Make a Puppy" (Excerpt)
4. "It's Impossible"
5. "Ovary Eyes"
6. "I Can Hardly Spell My Name"
7. "The Scary Caroler"
8. "Your Life as a Sequel"
9. "Smuckers"
10. "Alumni Lawn"
11. "Burly and Johnson"
12. "Mr. Crabby"
13. "Playboy, The Shit"
14. "Gloria Leonard"
15. "The Old Fat Robin (Alternate Version)"
16. "The Distance from Her to There"
17. "The Book I Haven't Read"
18. "Gettysburg Address"
