= Nixon (album) =

Studio album by Lambchop
- Released: February 7, 2000
- Studio: Sound Emporium (Nashville); Beech House (Nashville); Studio 19 (Nashville)
- Genre: Alternative country; chamber pop; countrypolitan; soul
- Length: 49:44
- Label: Merge; City Slang
- Producer: Mark Nevers; Kurt Wagner

Lambchop chronology
What Another Man Spills (1998)	Nixon (2000)	Tools in the Dryer (2001)

Singles from Nixon
- 1. "Up with People" Released: May 2, 2000

Nixon is the fifth studio album by American rock band Lambchop. It was released on February 7, 2000, and was issued by Merge Records and City Slang.

Nixon became a breakthrough release for Lambchop in the United Kingdom, where it received critical acclaim and was named among the best albums of 2000 by numerous publications.

== Composition ==
Nixon has been described as a merging of chamber pop, countrypolitan, and R&B sounds alongside "sweet" soul music.

== Artwork and title ==
The title Nixon alludes to Richard Nixon and was derived from the album's cover artwork, which is a painting by Wayne White, a friend of Lambchop frontman Kurt Wagner. "He always plays around with slogans or words. He considered the material on the Nixon album to be tragicomic, and an image of Nixon came to mind," Wagner explained.

== Release ==
Nixon was released on February 7, 2000, by Lambchop's European label City Slang, and on February 8, 2000, by the band's American label Merge Records. It peaked at number 60 on the UK Albums Chart. "Up with People" was released as a single from the album on May 2, 2000, reaching number 66 on the UK Singles Chart. According to The Guardian's John Aizlewood, Nixon established Lambchop as "standard bearers" for alternative country music, and "proved that the genre could be commercially viable if it painted its off-kilter pictures of redemption and loss in glorious Technicolor rather than mealy-mouthed monochrome."

== Critical reception ==
Professional ratings
Aggregate scores
Source	Rating
Metacritic	84/100
Review scores
Source	Rating
AllMusic	4/5 stars
Entertainment Weekly	A−
Los Angeles Times	3/4 stars
Mojo	5/5 stars
NME	9/10
Pitchfork	6.5/10 (2000); 8.3/10 (2014)
Q	4/5 stars
Rolling Stone	3.5/5 stars
Spin	9/10
Uncut	5/5 stars

Nixon was released to highly positive reviews from music critics, receiving a score of 84 out of 100 on the review aggregation website Metacritic, indicating "universal acclaim". The album was particularly well received by the British music press. NME critic Gavin Martin deemed it Lambchop's best record and said that its "sheer sonorous delight" justified comparisons to The Beach Boys' 1966 album Pet Sounds, while Allan Jones of Uncut praised Nixon as "one of the first great records of the new millennium". At the end of 2000, Nixon was named one of the year's best albums by numerous British publications, including Uncut (who ranked it as the best album of 2000), Mojo, NME, and Q.

Nixon was later included in the book 1001 Albums You Must Hear Before You Die.

== Track listing ==
All tracks are written by Kurt Wagner, except where noted.

No.	Title	Writer(s)	Length
1.	"The Old Gold Shoe"		6:21
2.	"Grumpus"		4:19
3.	"You Masculine You"		5:59
4.	"Up with People"		5:59
5.	"Nashville Parent"		5:38
6.	"What Else Could It Be?"		3:38
7.	"The Distance from Her to There"		4:20
8.	"The Book I Haven't Read"	Wagner; Curtis Mayfield	5:44
9.	"The Petrified Florist"		4:52
10.	"The Butcher Boy"	Traditional	2:54
Total length:			49:44

== Personnel ==
Credits are adapted from the album's liner notes.

Lambchop

- Paul Burch – vibraphone, arrangements
- C. Scott Chase – "open end wrenches", "lacquer thinner can", arrangements
- Dennis Cronin – trumpet, cornet, backing vocals, arrangements
- John Delworth – Hammond B-3 organ, Rhodes piano, Juno synthesizer, arrangements
- Allen Lowrey – drums, arrangements
- Jonathan Marx – trumpet, backing vocals, arrangements
- Alex McManus – electric guitar, arrangements
- Mark Nevers – atmospheric guitar, electric guitar, arrangements
- Paul Niehaus – pedal steel guitar, Fender Telecaster guitar, backing vocals, arrangements
- Matt Swanson – bass guitar, arrangements
- Marc Trovillion – bass guitar, arrangements
- Deanna Varagona – baritone saxophone, backing vocals, arrangements
- Kurt Wagner – vocals, 1946 Gibson L-7 guitar, Juno synthesizer, arrangements

Additional musicians

- Matt Bach – bass guitar
- Lloyd Barry – string arrangements
- Paul Booker – electric guitar
- Ken Coomer – additional percussion
- Tony Crow – piano
- Nashville String Machine – strings
- Sanchez – choral arrangements

Production

- Brady Barnett – editing
- Dennis Cronin – recording (assistant)
- Tommy Dorsey – mastering
- Brian Miles – recording (assistant)
- Mark Nevers – production, mixing, recording
- David Streit – recording (assistant)
- Kurt Wagner – production, mixing

Design

- Eric Bailey – design
- Wayne White – cover painting

== Charts ==
Chart (2000)	Peak position
Norwegian Albums (VG-lista)	27
Scottish Albums (OCC)	98
UK Albums (OCC)	60
UK Independent Albums (OCC)	7
