= The War of the Bruces =

Studio album by The Bruces
- Released: 2002
- Recorded: December 2001 – January 2002
- Genre: Alternative country, baroque rock, indie rock
- Label: Misra

The Bruces chronology
| Hialeah Pink (1995) | The War of the Bruces (2002) | The Shining Path (2004) |

The War of the Bruces is the second album, released in 2002, by The Bruces.

== Background ==
After nearly eight years had passed from the prior album Hialeah Pink, which Alex McManus spent working with several other indie acts, he released The War of the Bruces. These songs are a culmination of the years he spent as a supporting musician.

=== Style ===
The album is primarily guitar driven, but there are instrumental appearances of the banjo, sparse horn sections, and minimal use of keyboards layering the compositions; most are played by McManus, including the fiddle. The lyrics have been described as abstract, and at times metaphorical, and the music as fluid, atmospheric.

== Reception ==
Professional ratings
Review scores
| Source | Rating |
|---|---|
| Allmusic | 3/5 stars |
| FakeJazz | 8 / 12 |
| Lazy-i | Yes |
| Pitchfork Media | 8.2 |

The War of the Bruces received somewhat positive reviews; Tim McMahon stated that "McManus' dust-covered melodies are a road best taken". However, it took one critic several listens in order to enjoy it. The album appeared on the CMJ music charts on December 2, 2002, at No. 174. After staying on the charts for a total of 4 weeks, The War of the Bruces peaked at No. 151, and departed the charts on December 23, 2002.

== Track listing ==
| No. | Title | Length |
|---|---|---|
| 1. | "Do Si Do" | 4:14 |
| 2. | "The Cold War" | 4:14 |
| 3. | "Two Dogs" | 4:58 |
| 4. | "Haint Blue" | 4:35 |
| 5. | "Sunken City" | 4:22 |
| 6. | "Invisible Ceiling" | 8:03 |
| 7. | "Deep Colors Bleed" | 5:23 |
| 8. | "Hey, Bird" | 2:17 |
| 9. | "After Hours" | 5:18 |
| 10. | "Mountain" | 4:00 |
| 11. | "I Wish I Was a Mole in the Ground" | 3:18 |

== Sources ==
- "Radio 200". CMJ New Music Report. 73 (791). CMJ Network, Inc: 60. December 2, 2002. ISSN 0890-0795.
- "Radio 200". CMJ New Music Report. 74 (3). CMJ Network, Inc: 60. December 23, 2002. ISSN 0890-0795.
- Davis, Timothy C. (2002). "The War of the Bruces". No Depression (38–42). ISSN 1088-4971. OCLC 34647652.
- Klinge, Steve (December 2002). "The War of the Bruces". CMJ New Music Monthly (108). CMJ Network, Inc: 64. ISSN 1074-6978.
- Les Inrockuptibles (in French) (355–360). Editions Indépendantes. 2002. ISSN 0298-3788. OCLC 36948579.
