= OH (Ohio) =

Studio album by Lambchop
- Released: 2008
- Studios: Haptown and House of David
- Genres: Alternative country, chamber pop
- Length: 50:09
- Label: Merge
- Producers: Roger Moutenot, Mark Nevers

Lambchop chronology
Damaged (2006)	OH (Ohio) (2008)	Mr. M (2012)

Professional ratings
Review scores
Source	Rating
AllMusic	4/5 stars
Billboard	(favorable)
The Guardian	3/5 stars
Pitchfork	7.9/10

OH (Ohio) is an album by the American band Lambchop, released in 2008.

== Track listing ==
1. "Ohio"
2. "Slipped, Dissolved and Loosed"
3. "I'm Thinking of a Number (Between 1 and 2)"
4. "National Talk Like a Pirate Day"
5. "A Hold of You"
6. "Sharing a Gibson with Martin Luther King, Jr."
7. "Of Raymond"
8. "Please Rise"
9. "Popeye"
10. "Close Up and Personal"
11. "I Believe in You"

Special edition bonus disc

1. "Please Rise"
2. "Slipped, Dissolved and Loosed"
3. "Chelsea Hotel #2"
4. "Close Up"
5. "Of Raymond"
