= Lambchop (band) =

American band

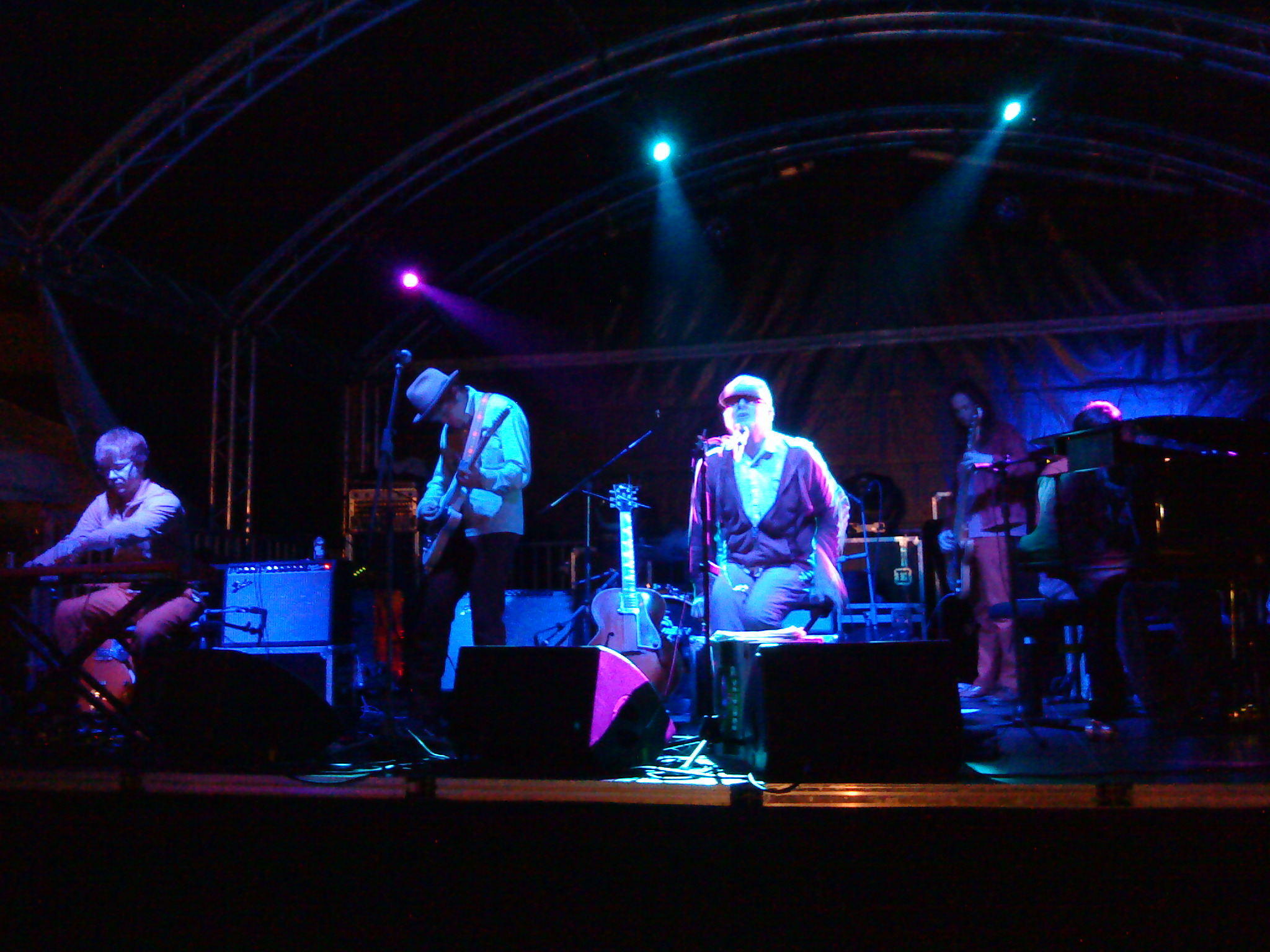
- Lambchop playing in Dachau, Germany, July 2009

Background information
- Origin: Nashville, Tennessee, United States
- Genres: Alternative country, alternative rock
- Years active: 1986–present
- Label: Merge
- Members: Kurt Wagner; Andrew Broder; Ryan Olson; C.J. Camerieri; Tim Purnell (Twit One)
- Past members: Marc Trovillion; William Tyler; Sam Baker; Jonathan Marx; Alex McManus; Deanna Varagona; Paul Niehaus; Roy Agee; John Delworth; Paul Burch; Mark Nevers; Chris A. Scott; Charles Scott Chase; Bill Killebrew; Steve Goodhue; Allen Lowrey; Dennis Cronin; Ryan Norris; Tony Crow; Matt Swanson; Scott Martin; Matt Glassmeyer; Andy Stack; James McNew
- Website: Lambchop.net

Lambchop, originally Posterchild, is an American band from Nashville, Tennessee, formed in 1986. Frontman and primary songwriter Kurt Wagner has remained the project's sole constant member across multiple line-up changes. The band's current line-up also includes Andrew Broder (keyboards), Ryan Olson (brass, woodwind), C.J. Camerieri (brass, woodwind) and Tim Purnell (drums). Lambchop is loosely associated with the alternative country genre. Initially indebted to traditional country, the music has subsequently moved through a range of influences including post-rock, soul and lounge music.

Across Lambchop's forty years, there have been several significant collaborators, with the project mostly consisting of a large and fluid collective of musicians focused around its creative centre, Kurt Wagner. Former longtime members and collaborators include guitarists Paul Niehaus, Mark Nevers, William Tyler and Alex McManus; bass guitarists Marc Trovillion and Matt Swanson; keyboardists John Delworth and Tony Crow; multi-instrumentalists Deanna Varagona and Jonathan Marx; and drummers Allen Lowrey, Charles Scott Chase, Paul Burch and Scott Martin. Other former collaborators include drummer Andy Stack and Yo La Tengo's James McNew.

The band has released seventeen albums across its career, with its most recent, Punching the Clown, released in August 2026 to widespread critical acclaim.

== Description and history ==
Initially formed as a three piece in 1986 with Kurt Wagner, bassist Marc Trovillion and guitarist Jim Watkins with the name Posterchild. They released some low-fi bedroom recordings on cassette such as I’m Fucking Your Daughter. In 1992 they released a split 7” with Crop Circle Hoax which got the attention of entertainment lawyer George Regis, who sued on behalf of the similarly named band Poster Children. After trying a few different names they settled on Lambchop and signed to Merge Records in 1993 releasing their debut single Nine that year.

Whatever the style, the characteristic mood of Lambchop's music is evoked by Wagner's distinctive songwriting: lyrically subtle and ambiguous, the vocals melodic but understated. American Songwriter described Wagner's lyrics as "witty and deeply insightful."

They were the backing band for Vic Chesnutt on his 1998 album The Salesman and Bernadette.

== Personal lives ==
Singer Kurt Wagner is married to founder of Nashville 90's record store, Lucy's Record Shop and Tennessee Democratic Party leader Mary Mancini.

== Personnel ==
Summary of members as credited on studio albums (1994–present)

Former bass player Marc Trovillion died of a heart attack in October 2013, aged 56.

== Discography ==
=== Studio albums ===
List of studio albums
Title	Album details
I Hope You're Sitting Down/Jack's Tulips	Released: September 19, 1994; Label: Merge Records; Formats: CD/Double LP/Cassette
How I Quit Smoking	Released: January 30, 1996; Label: Merge Records/City Slang (Europe)/Virgin France; Formats: CD/LP (single sided)
Thriller	Released: September 23, 1997; Label: Merge Records/City Slang; Formats: CD/LP
What Another Man Spills	Released: September 8, 1998; Label: Merge Records/City Slang; Formats: CD/LP (City Slang)
Nixon	Released: February 8, 2000; Label: Merge Records/City Slang; Formats: CD/LP (City Slang)
Is a Woman	Released: February 19, 2002; Label: Merge Records/City Slang/Spunk (AU)/P-Vine (JA)/Trama (Br); Formats: CD/Double LP
Aw Cmon	Released: February 9, 2004; Label: Merge Records/City Slang; Formats: CD
No You Cmon	Released: February 17, 2004; Label: Merge Records/City Slang; Formats: CD
Damaged	Released: August 14, 2006; Label: Merge Records/City Slang; Formats: CD/LP
OH (Ohio)	Released: October 6, 2008; Label: Merge Records/City Slang; Formats: CD/LP (City Slang)
Mr. M	Released: February 21, 2012; Label: Merge Records/City Slang/Spunk; Formats: CD/Double LP/DVD/MP3
FLOTUS	Released: November 4, 2016; Label: Merge Records/City Slang; Formats: CD/LP
This (Is What I Wanted to Tell You)	Released: March 22, 2019; Label: Merge Records/City Slang; Formats: CD/LP
Trip	Released: November 13, 2020; Label: Merge Records/City Slang; Formats: CD/LP
Showtunes	Released: May 21, 2021; Label: Merge Records/City Slang; Formats: CD/LP/MP3,FLAC
The Bible	Released: September 30, 2022; Label: Merge Records/City Slang; Formats: CD/Double LP/MP3, FLAC
Punching the Clown	Released: August 21, 2026; Label: Merge Records/City Slang; Formats:

=== EPs ===
- Hank (1996)
- The Queens Royal Trimma (Live Royal Festival Hall, London – Tour Only) (2000)
- Treasure Chest of the Enemy (Tour Only) (2001)
- CoLab (with Hands Off Cuba) (2005)
- Mr. N (2012)
- Basement Tapes (2019)

=== Releases as Posterchild ===
- "An Open Fresca" / "A Moist Towlette" (split with Crop Circle Hoax) (1992)

=== Cassettes ===
- Secret Secret Sourpuss (1990)
- Big Tussie (1992)
- Sorry About the Deformed Heart (split with Crop Circle Hoax and Spent) (1993)

=== Singles ===
- "Nine" / "Moody Fucker" (1993)
- "My Cliche" / "Loretta Lung" (1994)
- "Soaky in the Pooper" (1994)
- "Your Life as a Sequel" (1995)
- "Scared Out of My Shoes" (split 5" vinyl single with Spent) (1995)
- "The Man Who Loved Beer" (1996)
- "Hank" (1996)
- "Cigaretiquette" / "Mr. Crabby" (1996)
- "Whitey" / "Playboy, the Shit" (1997)
- "Give Me Your Love (Love Song)" (1998)
- "Your Fucking Sunny Day" (1998)
- "Up with People!" / "Miss Prissy" (2000)
- "Is a Woman" (2002)
- "Something's Going On (and On)" (2004)
- "The Hustle" / "When You Were Mine" (2017)

=== Compilation albums ===
- Tools in the Dryer (2001)
- The Decline of the Country and Western Civilization (1993-1999) (2006)
- The Decline of Country and Western Civilization, Part 2: The Woodwind Years (2006)
- Turd Goes Back: Essential Tracks from Secret Secret Sourpuss & Big Tussie (2011)

=== Tour only albums ===
- Pet Sounds Sucks (Live at the Great American Music Hall, San Francisco) (2002)
- Mono (Live in Würselen, Germany) (2003–04)
- Nashville Does Dallas (2004)
- Boo Fucking Who? (Live in Brussels, Belgium) (2004)
- Succulence (Live in Vienna, Austria) (2006)
- Rainer on My Parade (Live, various locations) (2008)
- Democracy (2012)
- Live at the Shanghai Symphony Chamber Hall (2017)

=== Live albums ===
- Live at XX Merge (2009)

=== DVDs ===
- No Such Silence (2007)
