= City Slang =

German independent record label

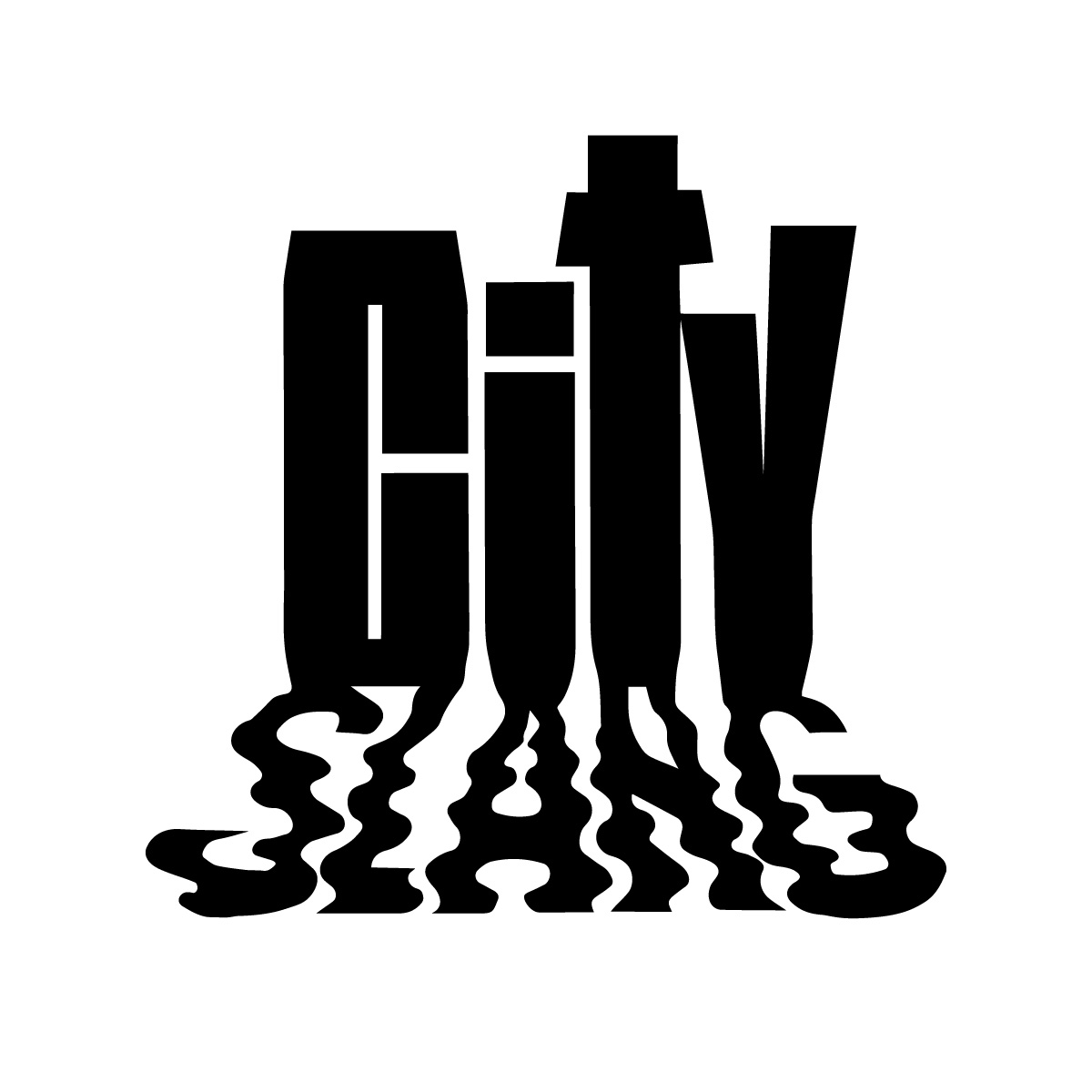
- Founded: 1990
- Founder: Christof Ellinghaus
- Genre: Indie rock, indie pop
- Country of origin: Berlin, Germany
- Official website: cityslang.com

City Slang is an independent record label based in Berlin, Germany.

== History ==
City Slang was founded in Berlin in 1990 by booking agent Christof Ellinghaus, initially to release the Flaming Lips' In a Priest Driven Ambulance in Europe. The label was named after the song "City Slang" by Sonic's Rendezvous Band. Its early roster focused on American indie rock acts such as Yo La Tengo and Hole, and it has since released records by Lambchop, Caribou, José González, Noga Erez and Boy Harsher.

== Artists ==
=== Current roster ===
List of current artists, adapted from the City Slang website.

A

- Au Suisse
- Erika M. Anderson

B

- Lou Barlow
- Bayonne
- Los Bitchos
- Boss Hog
- Built to Spill
- Boy Harsher

C

- Calexico
- Calexico and Iron & Wine
- Caribou (Dan Snaith)
- Ian Chang
- Casper Clausen
- COMA

D

- Dear Reader
- McKinley Dixon
- Kevin Drew

E

- Efterklang
- El Perro Del Mar
- Eleventh Dream Day
- Noga Erez

F

- Faux Real
- Fazer
- Freakwater

G

- Get Well Soon (band)
- Kenneth James Gibson
- Laura Gibson
- Gold Panda
- José González (singer)
- Grandbrothers

H

- Hauschka (Volker Bertelmann)
- Anna von Hausswolff
- Health
- Herman Dune
- Hole (band)

I

- Imarhan

J

- Jakuzi
- Jawbox
- Junior Boys
- Junip

K

- KAINA
- Sophia Kennedy
- King Hannah

L

- Lambchop
- Lambrini Girls
- Liima

M

- Dan Mangan
- Moon Duo
- Sen Morimoto
- Augustus Muller

N

- Nada Surf
- The Notwist

P

- El Perro del Mar
- Pom Pom Squad
- Port O'Brien
- Jessica Pratt

R

- Radio 4 (band)
- Roosevelt
- Royal Bangs

S

- Anna B Savage
- Schneider TM
- Sebadoh
- Selling
- Sinkane
- sir Was
- Softee
- Son Lux
- Sprints
- Superchunk

T

- Cortney Tidwell
- Timber Timbre
- Tindersticks
- To Rococo Rot
- Tortoise (band)
- Trans Am (band)

V

- Vera Sola
- Waleed
- White Denim
- Why? (American band)
- WIVES
- Wye Oak (band)

Y

- Yo La Tengo

Z

- Zouj

== Full roster ==
A

- Arcade Fire
- Au Suisse
- The Album Leaf

B

- Lou Barlow And His Sentridoh
- Bayonne
- Big Ray
- Blackmail
- Black Mountain
- Black Yaya
- Boss Hog
- Boy Harsher
- Broken Social Scene
- Built To Spill
- Don Caballero

C

- Calexico
- Caribou
- Cell
- Ken Chambers
- Ian Chang
- Chavez
- Vic Chesnutt
- CocoRosie
- COMA
- Combustible Edison
- Cosmic Psychos
- Cristobal And The Sea

D

- Das Damen
- Dear Reader
- Dave Depper
- Dim Stars
- McKinley Dixon
- Kevin Drew

E

- Efterklang
- Eight Frozen Modules
- Justine Electra
- Eleventh Dream Day
- El Perro Del Mar
- EMA
- Noga Erez
- The Experimental Pop Band

F

- The Faint
- Fazer
- The Flaming Lips
- Freakwater

G

- Gallon Drunk
- Sue Garner
- Get Well Soon
- Benjamin Gibbard
- Laura Gibson
- Gold Panda
- Goldrush
- José González
- Grandbrothers
- Guided By Voices

H

- Hauschka
- Lee Hazlewood
- Health
- HeCTA
- Herman Dune
- Hole

I

- Imarhan

J

- Jakuzi
- Jawbox
- Jessica Pratt
- Junior Boys
- Junip
- The Jal-Alai Savant

K

- KAINA
- Sophia Kennedy
- King Hannah
- The Kingsbury Manx
- Kort

L

- Lackthereof
- Lambchop
- Lambrini Girls
- Larmousse
- Lemonheads
- Liima
- Los Bitchos
- Love Child
- Love Inks

M

- Malajube
- Dan Mangan
- J Mascis + The Fog
- Menomena
- Moon Duo
- Sen Morimoto
- The Most Serene Republic
- Alexi Murdoch

N

- nAbi
- Nada Surf
- Naytronix
- The Notwist

O

- O'Death
- On An On

P

- Norman Palm
- Barbara Panther
- Panthers
- Alden Penner
- Pick A Piper
- Pink Mountaintops
- Pom Pom Squad
- Poolside
- Port O'Brien
- Jessica Pratt

R

- Radio 4
- Roosevelt
- Royal Bangs

S

- Salaryman
- Anna B Savage
- Schneider TM
- Seam
- Sebadoh
- Selling
- Sharon Stoned
- Sink
- Sinkane
- sir Was
- Skunk
- Smog
- Softee
- Son Lux
- Sophia
- Sprints
- Stuart A. Staples
- Stars
- St. Thomas
- Superchunk
- Sylvan Esso

T

- Techno Animal
- Cortney Tidwell
- Timber Timbre
- Tindersticks
- To Rococo Rot
- Tortoise
- Toy Fight
- Trans Am
- Tu Fawning

U

- Unsane

V

- Vera Sola
- Anna Von Hausswolff

W

- Waleed
- Waters
- Wheat
- White Denim
- Why?
- WIVES
- Wuhling
- Wye Oak

Y

- Yo La Tengo

Z

- Zouj

== See also ==
- List of record labels
