= Kurt Wagner (musician) =

American singer-songwriter

- Born: October 5, 1959 (age 66)
- Genre: Alternative country
- Occupations: Singer, songwriter, carpenter
- Formerly of: Lambchop, Kort, HeCTA

Kurt Wagner (born 1959) is an American musician, and the singer and songwriter of the Nashville-based alternative country band Lambchop. In 2015 he launched an electronic music project named HeCTA.

== Early life and education ==
Wagner was born in Nashville, Tennessee, to Northerner parents. As a youth, he wore his hair very long, which set him further as an outcast among his peers.

He attended art school in Memphis, Tennessee.

== Career ==
Wagner worked as a carpenter, laying wooden floors both before the success of Lambchop in the 1990s and afterwards.

== Personal life ==
He is married to Mary Mancini who was elected Chair of the Tennessee Democratic Party on January 10, 2015, as the second woman to be elected to that position. Previously she ran, unsuccessfully, in the Democratic primary against Jeff Yarbro for Senate District 21, which includes much of West Nashville in 2014. "I tell everybody, if you want to run for office some day and have an incredible fundraising event, marry a musician about 15-20 years before you declare your candidacy," Mancini said in a press release.

Wagner was diagnosed with prostate cancer in the 2000s and received treatment.

== Discography ==
=== Albums ===
- Something Missing, A Conversation Between The Altered Statesman And Kurt Wagner (self-released 2012) - vinyl and digital distribution
- Kurt (self-released 2007) - tour only CD from European solo tour

=== EPs ===
- Chester (Rykodisc 1999) - with Josh Rouse

=== Compilation albums ===
- Various artists, Songs for the Young at Heart (V2 2007) - contributed Inchworm
- Various artists, MAVIS presented by Ashley Beedle & Darren Morris (!K7 2010) - contributed Gangs of Rome

=== Other projects ===
- HeCTA, The Diet (Merge Records 2015)
- Kort, Invariable Heartache (City Slang 2010) with Cortney Tidwell

=== Guest appearances ===
- Morcheeba, Charango (Sire 2002) - What New York Couples Fight About
- The Band of Blacky Ranchette, Still Lookin' Good to Me (Thrill Jockey 2003)
- X-Press 2, Give It (Skint Records 2005)
- DJ Koze, Knock Knock (Pampa Records 2018) - Muddy Funster
- Madeline Kenney, Sucker's Lunch (Carpark Records 2020) - Sucker
