= Boston Calling Music Festival =

Boston-based music festival

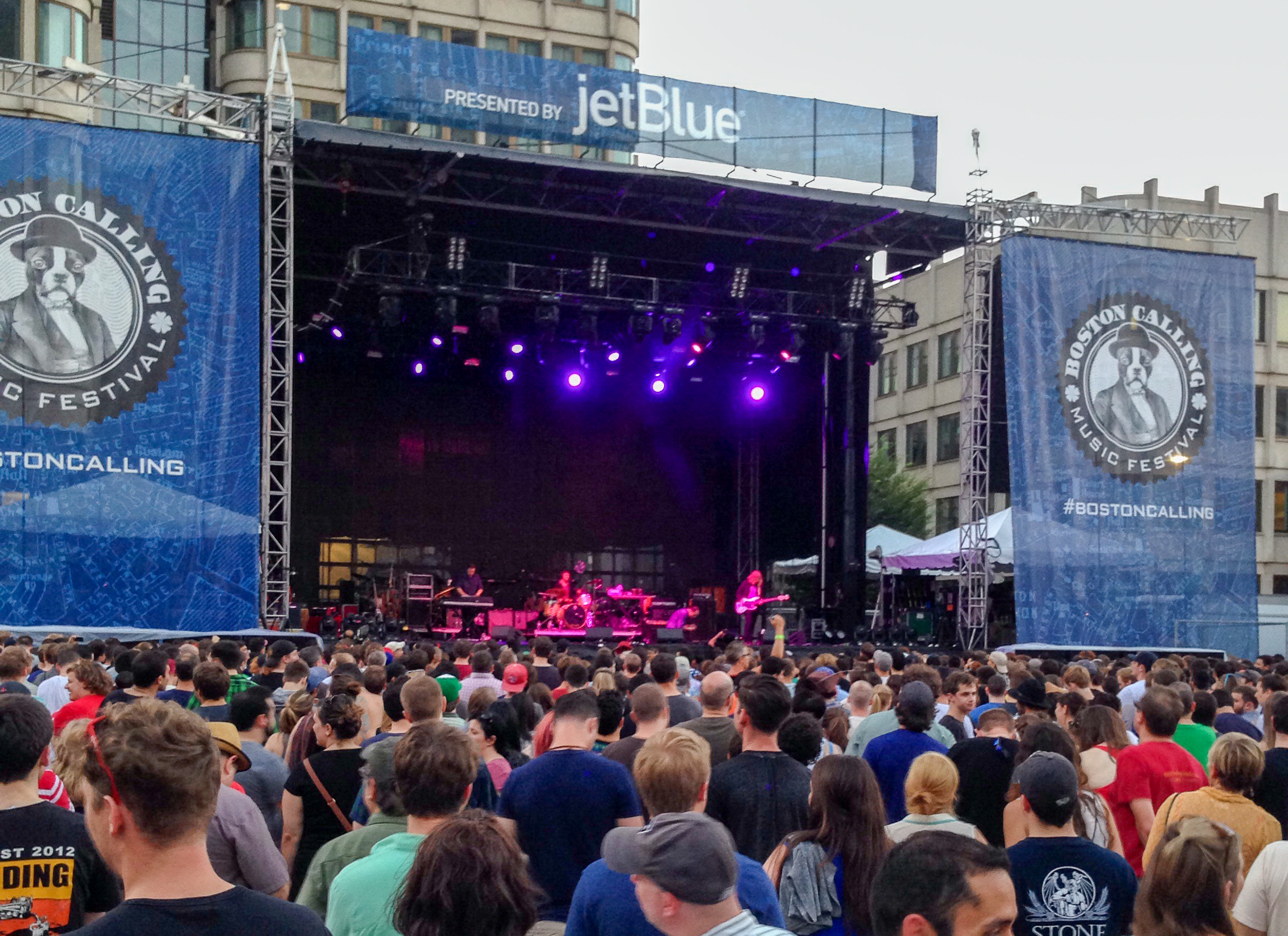
- A performance during the fall 2014 edition
- Venue: Harvard Athletic Complex (2017–present); Boston City Hall Plaza (2013–2016)
- Locations: Boston, Massachusetts, United States
- Years active: 2013–2019, 2022–2025
- Founders: Brian Appel and Mike Snow
- Most recent: May 23–25, 2025
- Next event: June 4–6, 2027
- Attendance: 40,000 (2024)
- Website: bostoncalling.com

Boston Calling Music Festival is a music festival held in Boston, Massachusetts, United States. It debuted in May 2013 at City Hall Plaza and took place twice a year, in May and September, through 2015. In 2016, the festival transitioned to being held annually in the second half of May, and since 2017 its venue has been Harvard Athletic Complex in the Allston neighborhood of Boston.

Past performers of Boston Calling have included The National, Sia, Beck, My Morning Jacket, Brandi Carlile, Of Monsters and Men, Fun, Kendrick Lamar, Passion Pit, Vampire Weekend, Modest Mouse, Airborne Toxic Event, Disclosure, Clairo, Eminem, Twenty One Pilots, Travis Scott, Tame Impala, Nine Inch Nails, Metallica, Luke Combs, Avril Lavigne, and Dave Matthews Band.

The festival was initially produced by Crash Line Productions, a Boston-based entertainment production company. Subsequently, the festival has been produced by Boston Calling Events, which was purchased by the Madison Square Garden Company in 2016, and by 2023 was owned by Live Nation Entertainment.

== History ==
=== Conception ===
Boston Calling was created by Brian Appel and Mike Snow, who had been colleagues at the now defunct independent alternative rock station WFNX Radio. The festival had initially been conceived as an event associated with the station but when WFNX was purchased by Clear Channel and stopped broadcasting in 2012, Appel and Snow continued development, seeing an opportunity to fill a gap as Boston had previously not had a large music festival. Appel and Snow considered it in important that Boston Calling be an urban festival, with Appel saying "[it was] critically important that [we] were in the city limits and that it was T-accessible and that we weren’t on the far reach on the outskirts of town that would make it challenging for people to get to". This complicated planning due to traffic and security considerations, and required extensive coordination with Boston city government.

Information about the new music festival for Boston appeared in a front-page article of The Boston Globe on February 27, 2013. The Boston Calling name "was inspired by the classic Clash album London Calling." The festival lineup was curated with help from Aaron Dessner of the band The National.

=== 2013-2019 ===
The festival debuted in May 2013, for two days over Memorial Day weekend at City Hall Plaza. The festival was notable as the first major event in the city since the Boston Marathon Bombings, and was received positively, selling out early and collecting praise for the musical performances and smoothly run logistics. The second iteration of the festival was held the following September, establishing a twice-yearly format used through 2016. The festival's first two editions were two-day events. In its second year, Boston Calling expanded to three days.

Due to the proximity to the Marathon Bombing, early iterations of the event saw heightened security. In August of 2014, DigBoston reported that during the 2013 festivals, the city of Boston had spent $650,000 to test IBM software that monitored concertgoers from existing security cameras, leading to criticism for not notifying concertgoers. Participants in the test were reportedly able to search for people by head color, skin tone, clothing texture, and baldness. The program could monitor the number of persons at the event and whether anyone was in a restricted area.

In 2016, a controlling interest Boston Calling Events, was purchased by the Madison Square Garden Company and the festival transitioned to being held annually in the second half of May. In 2017 its venue changed to Harvard Athletic Complex in the Allston neighborhood of Boston, with the new space allowing the addition of more music stages and the inclusion of non-music performers. The festival reportedly attracted 20,000–22,000 fans with its earlier editions, eventually drawing roughly 40,000 festival goers in 2017.

=== 2020–2021 Cancellations ===
On March 31, 2020, it was announced that the 2020 Boston Calling Festival was cancelled due to the COVID-19 pandemic. The organizers offered refunds for tickets, as well as the option to roll tickets over to the 2021 festival. When the 2021 festival was also cancelled, the same options were available.

=== 2022–2025 ===
In 2022, the festival returned, with headliners Metallica and Nine Inch Nails, with Nine Inch Nails headling back-to-back shows after a cancellation. By 2023, the festival was a subsidiary of Live Nation Entertainment .

In 2024, the event was criticized for overcrowding and potentially unsafe conditions as festival goers moved between stages, with attendance on Sunday estimated at 40,000 up from only 16,000 the day prior. Organizers later issuing a statement addressing dangerous conditions and promising to "create a better environment for everyone."

In response, the 2025 festival used a single main stage, and the on-site indoor arena was opened to festival attendees for the first time in six years to add access to an air conditioned indoor space for festival goers.

=== 2026 hiatus ===
On June 20, 2025, festival organizers announced a hiatus for 2026, for unspecified reasons, with plans for the next edition to be held June 4–6, 2027. Days later, Boston mayor Michelle Wu stated in a radio interview that organizers felt other Boston activities during 2026—including United States Semiquincentennial (250th anniversary) celebrations and several 2026 FIFA World Cup games (scheduled for Gillette Stadium south of Boston)—were expected to place "a lot of strain on hotel rooms and events and sponsorships."

== Past Lineups ==
Boston Calling was held twice a year, in May and September, during 2013–2015. The festival's first two editions were two-day events. In its second year, Boston Calling expanded to three days.

=== 2013 ===
==== Spring ====
The first Boston Calling, held May 25–26, 2013, featured:

Saturday line-up

- Fun. (Main Stage)
- The Shins (Main Stage)
- Marina and the Diamonds (Main Stage)
- Matt & Kim (Main Stage)
- Portugal. The Man (City Hall Stage)
- Cults (Main Stage)
- MS MR (City Hall Stage)
- St. Lucia
- Bad Rabbits (Main Stage)

Sunday line-up

- The National (Main Stage)
- Of Monsters and Men (Main Stage)
- Young the Giant (City Hall Stage)
- Andrew Bird (City Hall Stage)
- Dirty Projectors (Main Stage)
- Ra Ra Riot (City Hall Stage)
- The Walkmen (Main Stage)
- Youth Lagoon (City Hall Stage)
- Caspian (Main Stage)

==== Fall ====
The second Boston Calling, held September 7–8, 2013, featured:

- Vampire Weekend
- Passion Pit
- Kendrick Lamar
- Local Natives
- Major Lazer
- The Gaslight Anthem
- The Airborne Toxic Event
- Wolfgang Gartner
- Solange
- Bat for Lashes
- Flosstradamus
- Deer Tick
- Okkervil River
- Flume
- Lucius
- Big Black Delta
- You Won't
- and Bearstronaut

=== 2014 ===
==== Spring ====
The third Boston Calling, held May 23–25, 2014, featured:

Friday line-up

- Jack Johnson (Blue Stage)
- Edward Sharpe and the Magnetic Zeros (Blue Stage)
- Cass McCombs (Blue Stage)

Saturday line-up

- Death Cab for Cutie (Blue Stage)
- The Decemberists (Red Stage)
- The Head and the Heart (Blue Stage)
- Frank Turner and the Sleeping Souls (Red Stage)
- Jenny Lewis (Blue Stage)
- The Neighbourhood (Red Stage)
- Walk Off the Earth (Red Stage)
- Warpaint (Blue Stage)
- Maxïmo Park (Blue Stage)
- Magic Man (Red Stage)

Sunday line-up

- Modest Mouse (Blue Stage)
- Brand New (Red Stage)
- Tegan and Sara (Red Stage)
- Bastille (Blue Stage)
- Phosphorescent (Blue Stage)
- Built to Spill (Red Stage)
- Kurt Vile and the Violators (Blue Stage)
- The Districts (Red Stage)
- Tigerman WOAH! (Blue Stage)
- The Box Tiger (Red Stage)

==== Fall ====
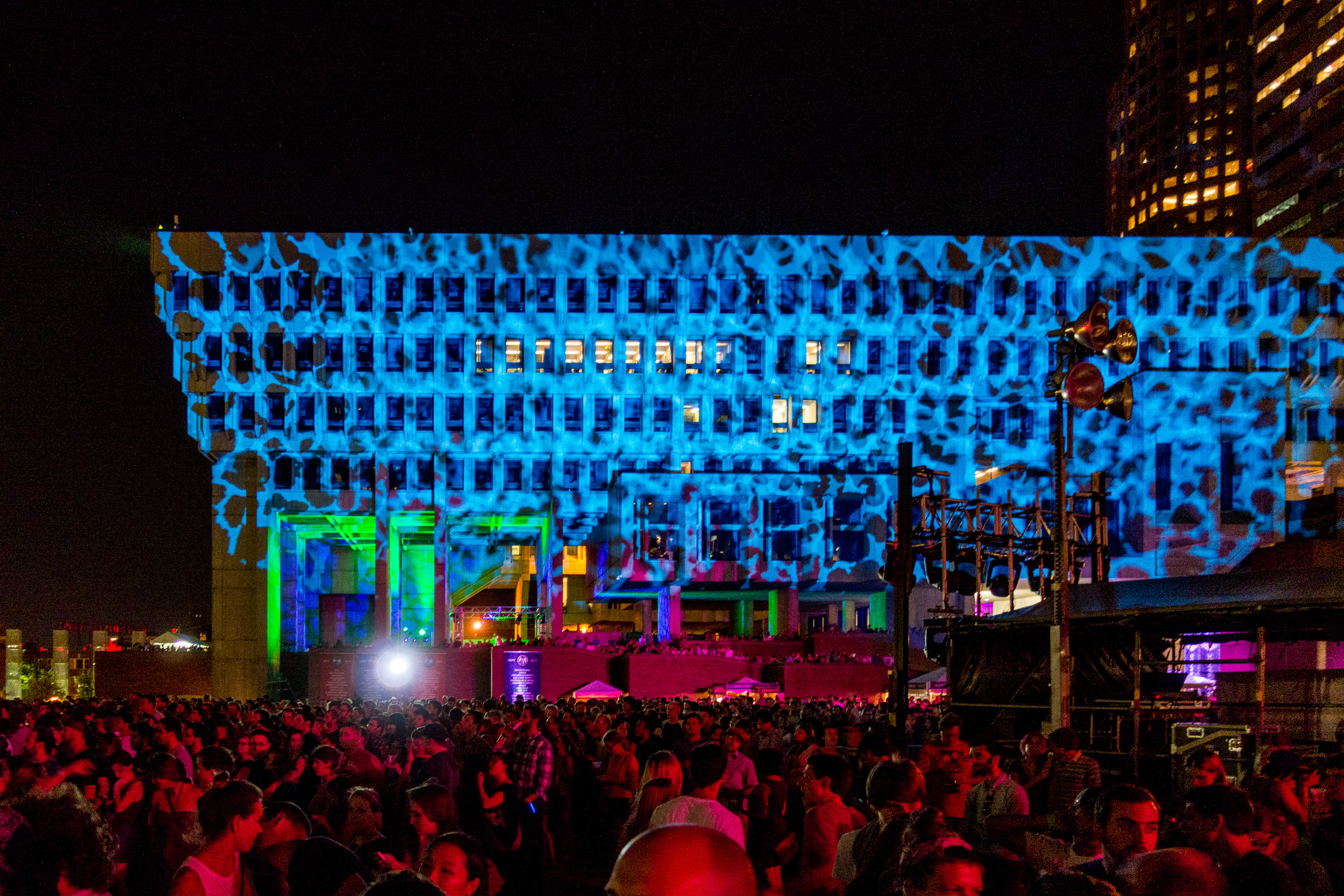
Boston City Hall illuminated, Fall 2014

The fourth Boston Calling, held September 5–7, 2014, featured:

The National, Lorde, The Replacements, Nas x The Roots, Neutral Milk Hotel, Childish Gambino, Spoon, Girl Talk, The 1975, Volcano Choir, Twenty One Pilots, The War on Drugs, The Hold Steady, Lake Street Dive, Bleachers, White Denim, Sky Ferreira, Future Islands, San Fermin, S. Carey, CliffLight, and Gentlemen Hall.

=== 2015 ===
==== Spring ====
The fifth Boston Calling, held May 22–24, 2015, featured:

Beck, Pixies, My Morning Jacket, Ben Harper and the Innocent Criminals, Tenacious D, Tame Impala, St. Vincent, TV on the Radio, Marina and the Diamonds, Jason Isbell, Gerard Way, Tove Lo, Chet Faker, Run the Jewels, The Lone Bellow, Sharon Van Etten, Jungle, MØ, ILoveMakonnen, DMA's, The Ballroom Thieves, and Krill.

==== Fall ====
The sixth Boston Calling, held September 25–27, 2015, featured:

The Avett Brothers, Alt-J, Alabama Shakes, Hozier, Of Monsters and Men, Chvrches, Ben Howard, Chromeo, Walk the Moon, Nate Ruess, Father John Misty, Sturgill Simpson, MisterWives, Gerard Way and the Hormones, Daughter, Twin Shadow, Stephen Malkmus and the Jicks, Fidlar, Doomtree, Gregory Alan Isakov, Grizfolk, Bully, Dirty Bangs, and Grey Season.

=== 2016 ===
The seventh Boston Calling, held May 27–29, 2016, featured:

Sia, Disclosure, Robyn, ODESZA, Sufjan Stevens, Haim, Miike Snow, Janelle Monáe, City and Colour, Courtney Barnett, Elle King, The Front Bottoms, BØRNS, Charles Bradley and his Extraordinaires, The Vaccines, Vince Staples, Battles, Unknown Mortal Orchestra, Christine and the Queens, Lisa Hannigan and Aaron Dessner, Lizzo, Palehound, and Michael Christmas.

=== 2017 ===
The eighth Boston Calling was held May 26–28, 2017. The event was staged for the first time at the Harvard Athletic Complex and featured:

Chance the Rapper, Bon Iver, Sigur Ros, Migos, Mac Demarco, Sylvan Esso, Car Seat Headrest, Francis and the Lights, Deerhoof, Whitney, Lucy Dacus, Vundabar, Xylouris White, Mumford and Sons, The xx, The 1975, Nathaniel Rateliff and the Night Sweats, Tegan and Sara, Brandi Carlile, Majid Jordan, Oh Wonder, Danny Brown, Cousin Stizz, Russ, Strand of Oaks, Moses Sumney, Kevin Morby, Tkay Maidza, Alexandra Savior, Tool, Major Lazer, Weezer, Cage the Elephant, Run the Jewels, Flatbush Zombies, Converge, Piebald, Wolf Parade, Frightened Rabbit, Buffalo Tom, PUP, Hiss Golden Messenger, The Hotelier, and Mondo Cozmo.

=== 2018 ===
The ninth Boston Calling was held on May 25–27, 2018, at the Harvard Athletic Complex. The headliners were Eminem, The Killers and Jack White.

Line-up

- Eminem
- The Killers
- Jack White
- Queens of the Stone Age
- The National
- Paramore
- Tyler, the Creator
- Khalid
- Bryson Tiller (replaced by Mike D)
- Portugal. The Man
- Fleet Foxes
- St. Vincent
- The Decemberists
- Brockhampton
- Maggie Rogers
- Royal Blood
- Manchester Orchestra
- Daniel Caesar
- Dirty Projectors
- Stormzy (replaced by Cousin Stizz)
- Thundercat
- Belly
- Pussy Riot
- Julien Baker
- Alvvays
- The Menzingers
- Thee Oh Sees
- Perfume Genius
- Noname
- (Sandy) Alex G
- Big Thief
- Mount Kimbie
- Citizen
- Pond
- Zola Jesus
- Taylor Bennett
- Westside Gunn & Conway the Machine
- Charly Bliss
- Leikeli47
- Field Report
- Lillie Mae
- Tauk
- This Is the Kit
- Weakened Friends
- Stl Gld

=== 2019 ===
The 10th edition of the festival was held on May 24–26, 2019, at the Harvard Athletic Complex. The headliners this year were Twenty One Pilots, Travis Scott, and Tame Impala.

Line-up

- Twenty One Pilots
- Travis Scott
- Tame Impala
- Odesza
- Logic
- Greta Van Fleet
- Chvrches
- Anderson .Paak & The Free Nationals
- Hozier
- Janelle Monáe (Canceled)
- Brandi Carlile
- Lord Huron
- Sheck Wes
- Rainbow Kitten Surprise
- Christine and the Queens
- Big Red Machine
- King Princess
- Black Star
- Guster
- Marina
- Mitski
- Tank and the Bangas
- Clairo
- Mura Masa
- Denzel Curry
- Snakehips
- Yaeji
- Princess Nokia
- Chromeo (DJ set)
- Snail Mail
- Ravyn Lenae
- Gang of Youths
- Young Fathers
- Superorganism
- Turnstile
- SOB x RBE
- Cautious Clay
- Shame
- Pale Waves
- Pile
- Rolling Blackouts Coastal Fever
- Dessa
- White Reaper
- Sidney Gish
- Kilo Kish
- Skegss
- Sasha Sloan
- Naeem
- Adia Victoria
- Easy Life

Comedy & entertainment

- Michael Che
- Jenny Slate
- Fred Armisen
- Imogen Heap
- Boston Ballet
- Melissa Villaseñor
- Sam Jay
- Marina Franklin
- Lamont Price

=== 2022 ===
The 11th edition of the festival was held on May 27–29, 2022, at the Harvard Athletic Complex. The headliners this year were Metallica who headlined on Sunday, and Nine Inch Nails headlining both Friday as a replacement for The Foo Fighters who cancelled due to the death of long-time drummer Taylor Hawkins and Saturday as a last minute replacement of The Strokes after they cancelled due to COVID-19. The festival was evacuated for approximately two hours on Saturday due to severe weather.

Friday line-up

- Nine Inch Nails
- Rufus Du Sol
- Haim
- Avril Lavigne
- Cheap Trick
- Oliver Tree
- The Struts
- Paris Jackson
- Paris Texas
- The Backseat Lovers
- Grandson
- Mob Rich
- Pom Pom Squad
- Born Without Bones
- Avenue
- Miranda Rae
- The Chelsea Curve

Saturday line-up

- Nine Inch Nails
- Run the Jewels
- Black Pumas
- Earthgang
- Orville Peck
- KennyHoopla
- Celisse (set cut short due to weather)
- Frances Forever (cancelled due to weather)
- Sudan Archives (cancelled due to weather)
- Coral Moons (cancelled due to weather)
- Ali McGurk (cancelled due to weather)
- Hinds
- Julie Rhodes
- Charlotte Sands
- Van Buren Records
- Dutch Tulips
- The Strokes (cancelled due to COVID)
- King Gizzard & the Lizard Wizard (cancelled due to COVID)

Sunday line-up

- Metallica
- Weezer
- Glass Animals
- Modest Mouse
- Goose
- Ripe
- Japanese Breakfast
- Cults
- Peach Tree Rascals
- Horsegirl
- DJO
- Oompa
- Cliff Notez
- Cam Meekins
- Crooked Coast
- Aaron and the Lord
- Paper Tigers

=== 2023 ===
The 12th edition of the festival was held on May 26–28, 2023, at the Harvard Athletic Complex. The main headliners this year were Foo Fighters (in their first major concert since drummer Taylor Hawkins' death the previous year), The Lumineers and Paramore, with co-headlining slots taken by the Yeah Yeah Yeahs (cancelled due to illness), Alanis Morissette and Queens of the Stone Age.

Friday line-up

- Foo Fighters
- Yeah Yeah Yeahs (cancelled due to illness)
- The National
- Dropkick Murphys
- Niall Horan
- Chelsea Cutler
- Teddy Swims
- Léon
- Talk
- Celisse
- The Beachea
- Zolita
- GA-20
- Alisa Amador
- Little Fuss
- Blue Light Bandits
- Summer Cult
- Brandie Blaze

Saturday line-up

- The Lumineers
- Alanis Morissette
- Noah Kahan
- The Flaming Lips
- Mt. Joy
- Fletcher
- Joy Oladokun
- Declan McKenna
- The Aces
- Loveless
- Welshly Arms
- Neemz
- The Q-Tip Bandits
- Najee Janey
- Actor Observer
- Coral Moons
- Chrysalis

Sunday line-up

- Paramore
- Queens of the Stone Age
- Bleachers
- King Gizzard and the Lizard Wizard
- Maren Morris
- 070 Shake
- The Walkmen
- The Linda Lindas
- Wunderhorse
- Genesis Owusu
- Brutus
- Juice
- Mint Green
- Couch
- Ali McGuirk
- Sorry Mom
- Workman Song

=== 2024 ===
The 13th edition of the festival was held on May 24–26, 2024, at the Harvard Athletic Complex. The main headliners were Ed Sheeran, Tyler Childers, and The Killers, with co-headlining slots taken by Leon Bridges, Trey Anastasio, and Hozier.

After an estimated 16,000 people attended the Saturday show, attendance on Sunday was estimate at 40,000, which strained logistics and led to organizers later issuing a statement addressing dangerous conditions and promising to "create a better environment for everyone."

Friday line-up

- Ed Sheeran
- Leon Bridges
- Reneé Rapp
- Young the Giant
- Luke Hemmings
- David Kushner
- Cannons
- Beach Weather
- Ric Wilson
- Madi Diaz
- MARIS
- Divine Sweater
- Kieran Rhodes
- Kei
- Jvk
- Justin Clancy
- The Wolff Sisters

Saturday line-up

- Tyler Childers
- Trey Anastasio & Classic TAB
- Khruangbin
- Frank Turner and the Sleeping Souls
- Jessie Murph
- d4vd
- The Red Clay Strays
- Tanner Usrey
- Bad Rabbits
- The Castellows
- Motherfolk
- Senseless Optimism
- ToriTori
- Ward Hayden and The Outliers
- Paper Lady
- Cakeswagg
- Highwater Haulers

Sunday line-up

- The Killers
- Hozier
- Megan Thee Stallion
- The Revivalists
- Lovejoy
- Chappell Roan
- Blondshell
- Royel Otis
- The Heavy Heavy
- Christone "Kingfish" Ingram
- Francis of Delirium
- Stefan Thev
- The Thing
- Fleshwater
- Zola Simone
- Billy Dean Thomas
- Tysk Tysk Task

=== 2025 ===
The 14th edition of the festival was held on May 23–25, 2025, at the Harvard Athletic Complex. The main headliners were Luke Combs, Fall Out Boy, and Dave Matthews Band, with co-headlining slots taken by Megan Moroney, Avril Lavigne, and Vampire Weekend.

The festival used a large, single main stage, referred to as the green stage, rather than the two separate green and red main stages used in prior years. To improve transition times between sets, the green stage incorporated a rotating stage design. In addition to the green stage, the festival maintained the smaller, blue and orange stages. Additionally, the on-site indoor arena was opened to festival attendees for the first time in six years. Through a partnership with the Berklee College of Music, the arena showcased student musicians Tiril Jackson, Devon Gates & Friends, Su Yavuz, Srisley, Solaya + The Effect, Manuela Sanchez Goubert, and Aniye in addition to serving as an air conditioned indoor space available to festival goers.

Friday line-up

- Luke Combs (Green Stage)
- Megan Moroney (Green Stage)
- Sheryl Crow (Green Stage)
- T-Pain (Blue Stage)
- TLC (Cancelled due to medical circumstance)
- MIKE (Blue Stage)
- Thee Sacred Souls (Blue Stage)
- Max McNown (Green Stage)
- Wilderado (Green Stage)
- Infinity Song (Blue Stage)
- Kyle Dion (Blue Stage)
- Bebe Stockwell (Green Stage)
- Holy Roller (Green Stage)
- Latrell James (Orange Stage)
- Megan From Work (Orange Stage)
- Future Teens (Orange Stage)
- Battlemode (Orange Stage)

Saturday line-up

- Fall Out Boy (Green Stage)
- Avril Lavigne (Green Stage)
- Cage the Elephant (Green Stage)
- The Black Crowes (Blue Stage)
- All Time Low (Green Stage)
- James Bay (Blue Stage)
- The Maine (Green Stage)
- Lucius (Blue Stage)
- Valley (Green Stage)
- Mon Rovîa (Green Stage)
- Amble (Blue Stage)
- Sofia Isella (Green Stage)
- Timmy Skelly (Blue Stage)
- Simon Robert French (Orange Stage)
- Rebuilder (Orange Stage)
- Sidebody (Orange Stage)
- Pinklids (Orange Stage)

Sunday line-up

- Dave Matthews Band (Green Stage)
- Vampire Weekend (Green Stage)
- Sublime (Green Stage)
- Public Enemy (Blue Stage)
- Remi Wolf (Green Stage)
- Goth Babe (Green Stage)
- Tom Morello (Blue Stage)
- The 502s (Blue Stage)
- Spin Doctors (Green Stage)
- I Dont Know How but They Found Me (Blue Stage)
- Mo Lowda & the Humble (Green Stage)
- Sam Austins (Blue Stage)
- SNACKTIME (Green Stage)
- Layzi (Orange Stage)
- Copilot (Orange Stage)
- Vivid Bloom (Orange Stage)
- Nate Perry & Ragged Company (Orange Stage)
