= Why Does the Earth Give Us People to Love? =

Studio album by Kara Jackson
- Released: April 14, 2023
- Genre: Folk
- Length: 52:01
- Label: September
- Producers: Kara Jackson; Kaina Castillo; Sen Morimoto; Nnamdi Ogbonnaya

Kara Jackson chronology
A Song for Every Chamber of the Heart (2019)	Why Does the Earth Give Us People to Love? (2023)

Why Does the Earth Give Us People to Love? is the debut album by American poet and singer-songwriter Kara Jackson, who formerly served as the U.S. National Youth Poet Laureate from 2019 to 2020. It was released on April 14, 2023, through September Recordings.

== Background and recording ==
Working in her childhood bedroom, Kara Jackson began demoing Why's songs during the early COVID-19 lockdowns. Kaina, NNAMDÏ, and Sen Morimoto would later join as co-producers to help re-record them for the album.

Why's first single "no fun/party" was released on October 20, 2022. It was Jackson's first new music since the release of her EP A Song for Every Chamber of the Heart in 2019.

== Reception ==
Professional ratings
Aggregate scores
Source	Rating
Metacritic	90/100
Review scores
Source	Rating
AllMusic	4.5/5 stars
Exclaim!	9/10
The Line of Best Fit	9/10
Loud and Quiet	8/10
Paste	8.0/10
Pitchfork	8.2/10

Why Does the Earth Give Us People to Love? received a score of 90 out of 100 on review aggregator Metacritic based on 4 critics' reviews, indicating "universal acclaim".

Reviewing the album for AllMusic, Marcy Donelson compared it favourably to Jackson's previous releases by noting that her, "spare acoustic-guitar outing, even though the EP garnered positive attention for its blunt observations and turns of phrase as well as Jackson's husky, authoritative voice, it may have done little to prepare the music world for the stark theatricality and poignancy of her first album" which Donelson later described as, "Parts Daniel Johnston and avant-cabaret show." Noah Ciubotaru praised the album's lyricisim in a review for Exclaim! by writing that, "Jackson doesn't furnish that verb with an object. The act of choosing is what's of significance — what counters the downward spiral of heartbreak — and this contemplation of preference, agency, and desire courses through Why Does the Earth Give Us People to Love?" Concluding the review for Loud and Quiet, Susan Darlington called the album, "A collection of songs about love and relationships, the album is also about self-discovery. She’s not far wrong when she has the revelation that, “I am pretty top-notch."

Devon Chodzin reviewed the album for Paste, describing it as, "not 'raw,' at least not in the sense that the writing is unrefined or off-the-cuff. Instead, that distinction comes through how the listener is made to feel listening to Jackson’s cosmic country jams." In Pitchfork, Mary Retta wrote, "The music is neither sweet nor loving; many of the songs are harsh and disorienting, probing and uncomfortable. Where others might posit that it’s better to have loved and lost, Jackson argues that love is loss. Her storytelling is masterful, filled with earnest lyricism and a knack for arresting imagery."

== Track listing ==
All tracks are written by Kara Jackson, Kaina Castillo, Sen Morimoto and Nnamdi Ogbonnaya, except "Pawnshop" by Jackson, Castillo and Morimoto.

Why Does the Earth Give Us People to Love? track listing
No.	Title	Length
1.	"Recognized"	1:02
2.	"No Fun/Party"	5:56
3.	"Dickhead Blues"	5:25
4.	"Therapy"	1:17
5.	"Pawnshop"	2:38
6.	"Brain"	3:39
7.	"Free"	7:02
8.	"Lily"	2:57
9.	"Rat"	7:53
10.	"Why Does the Earth Give Us People to Love?"	6:15
11.	"Curtains"	5:55
12.	"Recognize Reprise"	0:49
13.	"Liquor"	1:13
Total length:		52:01

== Personnel ==
Musicians

- Kara Jackson – vocals (all tracks), backing vocals (2, 4–12), piano (1, 12), banjo (2), guitar (2–11, 13)
- Kaina Castillo – backing vocals (4, 8–12); synths (7), programming (7, 12)
- Sen Morimoto – backing vocals (4, 7–12); additional piano (1, 12), piano (2, 3, 5–11), bass (2, 4), electric guitar (2, 4, 6, 9), Wurlitzer (3), strings (3, 8, 10), percussion (4, 7, 9), organ (5, 6, 9, 11, 13), soprano saxophone (7), synths (7), programming (7, 9, 12), saxophone (8), horns (10)
- Nnamdi Ogbonnaya – backing vocals (2, 4, 8–12); xylophone (3), bass (3, 4, 8–11), strings (3, 8), drums (3, 10), bells (3, 11), 12 string guitar (4), percussion (4–6), synths/programming (8)
- Macie Stewart – violin (2, 7, 9)
- Nick Levine – slide guitar (5, 6)
- Forrest Jackson – vocal interlude (3), trombone (8)
- Elsz – harp (7)

Technical

- Jason Agel – mixing
- Heba Kadry – mastering
