= Ward Hayden and The Outliers =

American band

Ward Hayden and the Outliers
- Also known as: Girls, Guns, and Glory (2005–2018)
- Origin: Boston, Massachusetts, U.S.
- Genres: Country; rock and roll; country rock; rockabilly; heartland rock; rock; Americana; blues
- Years active: 2005–present
- Labels: Faster Horses Recordings (2023-present); independent (2005-2008, 2016-2023); Lonesome Day Records (2008-2014); Proper (2014); Sony RED (2015); MRI (2015); Dry Lightning Records (2015)
- Members: Ward Hayden; Greg Hall; Sam Crawford; Tyler Marshall; Patrick Brown
- Past members: Bruce Beagley; John Graham; Colin Toomey; Brendan Murphy; Colt Thompson; Justin Maxwell; Michael Calabrese; Chris Hersch; Joe Keffler; Paul Dilley; Josh Kiggans; Cody Nilsen
- Website: https://www.wardhaydenandtheoutliers.com

Ward Hayden and the Outliers (WHATO), formerly known as Girls, Guns, and Glory, is an American band from Boston, Massachusetts. They currently release music on their own label, Faster Horses Recordings. Prior to this, at various times, the band had released music independently and was formerly signed to Lonesome Day Records and released albums with Sony RED, MRI and Dry Lightning Records in the US, as well as through Proper in the UK and Rough Trade in Europe. Their music is a mix of old school country, early rock 'n' roll, blues, and country rock. Inspiration is partly derived from Hank Williams, Johnny Cash, and Johnny Horton classics. Ward Hayden and the Outliers has garnered seven Boston Music Awards (BMA). They were the 2011 winner of the BMA for "Americana Artist of the Year", and were nominated in the "Live Artist of the Year" category. They were also the 2019 winner of the BMA for "Country Artist of the Year". The band is popular throughout Europe and Scandinavia and has toured there for several years. Their 2016 album Love and Protest was a top 5 album in Norway and peaked at #1 on the Norway country album charts.

The band has released ten studio albums, three live albums, one studio EP, one live EP, and numerous singles; their most recent studio albums were Little by Little and Piece by Piece (both released in 2025), and their most recent live album was Live in Sweden (2024).

== History ==
=== 2005—2019 ===
The band was formed in 2005 by vocalist/rhythm guitarist Ward Hayden and bassist Bruce Beagley, joined shortly afterward by lead guitarist Colin Toomey and drummer John Graham. Colt Thompson replaced Toomey in 2007. In 2007, the band won a Boston Music Award, and, in 2008, they were "the first roots, rock and country act to ever win" the WBCN Rumble. 2008 led to the band's third studio recording and their first Top 10 album Inverted Valentine, which peaked at #8 on the Americana Music Association (AMA) Chart. It was the highest charting album by an Independent band that year and led to the band being courted by numerous Major and Independent record labels in the US and Europe.

After re-releasing "Inverted Valentine" with label support in 2009, the band embarked on two years of non-stop touring, racking up close to 200 shows a year in 2009 and 2010. During this time the band toured with Yarn, Lake Street Dive, Della Mae, Bill Kirchen, Eilen Jewell, Bobby Bare Jr, Trampled By Turtles, Drag The River, and Slim Cessna's Auto Club.

By 2010, Hayden was the sole original member left in the band, with Boston-based guitarist Chris Hersch and bassist Paul Dilley joining. A second guitarist, Joe Keffler, also toured with the band in 2010. Their third album, 2011's Sweet Nothings featured a collaboration (the song "1000 Times") with local Massachusetts alternative country musician Sarah Borges. Since December 2010, the band has held annual tribute concerts for Hank Williams in late December and early January to mark the anniversary of Williams' death. In 2011, the band opened for Wanda Jackson. By 2012, Josh Kiggans became the band's third drummer replacing Michael Calabrese, also of the Boston-based band Lake Street Dive.

In 2014, Rolling Stone included the band in its list of the top 10 new country artists that fall. The band released the studio album Good Luck that same year. The Americana Music Association ranked Good Luck on their list of the top 100 Americana albums of 2014; Good Luck ranked #54 out of 100. In 2015, Rolling Stone also reviewed the band's then-recently released live tribute album to Hank Williams, A Tribute to Hank Williams - Live, which was their first live album.

In 2016, Hersch left the band and was replaced later that year by Cody Nilsen. Also in 2016, the band decided to release new music independently, beginning with the album Love and Protest. The album featured local Massachusetts sideman Duke Levine as guest lead guitarist because it was recorded between Hersch's departure and Nilsen's arrival. The band also featured a touring lead guitarist during this time. The album was recorded 'live' in the studio using analog equipment. After Nilsen joined the band, they opened for NRBQ. Love and Protest was released on November 4, 2016.

In 2018, the band dropped the name Girls, Guns and Glory because of the polarizing issue of gun control in the United States. Hayden later told The Patriot Ledger (in 2021) that the band also (at the time) had more recently had difficulty booking shows; for example, he mentioned that some people assumed they were a heavy metal band. Also in 2018, the band opened for The Oak Ridge Boys, Marty Stuart & His Fabulous Superlatives, Los Lobos, and Dwight Yoakam.

In August 2019, the band "officially" released their EP Can't Judge A Book. The status of this release is unclear, as they have referred to it sometimes as an EP (during its initial limited release in September 2018) and other times as a full album. The EP was self-produced by the band and mostly featured covers (of songs by Elvis Presley, Johnny Cash, Chuck Berry, Fountains of Wayne, Brinsley Schwarz, and The Derailers), some of which had been re-imagined and re-arranged by the band. The EP also included one original song, "Naturally Crazy". That same year, the band opened for Midland at the Cape Cod Melody Tent in Hyannis, MA. In late 2019, the band toured Europe, playing dates in Sweden, Norway, Spain, France, and Switzerland.

=== 2020—present ===
In January 2020, longtime bassist Paul Dilley left the band, with Matt Murphy of the Eilen Jewell Band serving as a substitute (as the band referred to it, "on loan") the next month. Dilley was ultimately replaced by local country musician Greg Hall. As with many musicians, the band's touring schedule was hit hard by the coronavirus pandemic. During this time, Hayden focused on his family and songwriting, Hall gave music lessons, and Kiggans and Nilsen worked construction jobs (as both had done before joining the band). Most of the songs included on their seventh studio album, Free Country, were written during the various phases of the pandemic, including lockdowns.

In 2021, the band opened for Los Lobos for a second time. They also released their seventh studio album, Free Country, during 2021; it was produced by Eric "Roscoe" Ambel. In 2022, the band performed special shows in honor the 99th anniversary of Hank Williams' birth; at least one of these shows featured guest musician Katy Boc Nickerson on fiddle. Their European tour in late 2022 included shows in Spain, France, Belgium, and Switzerland.

In early 2023, while Nilsen worked as a guitar tech for the Dropkick Murphys, Ryan Hommel temporarily sat in with the band on lead guitar. Around this time, during a podcast interview, Hayden discussed the band's upcoming studio album, South Shore, with another studio album and another Hank Williams tribute live album scheduled to follow later in 2023 and in 2024. The band formed their own record label, "Faster Horses Recordings," to better distribute their post-2017 catalog. In March 2023, the band released a re-arranged country cover of "Badfish", originally by the band Sublime, as a non-album single. In May 2023, the band's eighth studio album South Shore was released. Two singles, "Write a Song" and "(Breaking Up With) My Hometown", were released from South Shore. In September, A Celebration of Hank Williams Live, the band's second live tribute album to Hank Williams, was released, to commemorate the 100th anniversary of Williams' birth. Two singles and an EP were released in advance of the live album's release and in order to promote it.

In early 2024, the band announced that they had recorded a studio album of Bruce Springsteen covers as a tribute to Springsteen; Hayden is a Springsteen fan and has said that Springsteen's songwriting has greatly influenced his own songwriting. Since January 2024, the band has released three singles to promote this album: "Brilliant Disguise", "Dancing in the Dark", and "Glory Days". During this time, the band returned to Europe to tour Spain and Sweden.

In March 2024, shortly after returning from this tour, the band announced that longtime lead guitarist Nilsen had left the band. Several lead guitarists have filled in since Nilsen's departure, including Tyler Marshall and Sam Crawford. The band also promoted their Boston Calling appearance with a performance at WBUR CitySpace, and Hayden had also appeared twice on the show "Almost Famous Radio" on the local radio station WATD-FM and was interviewed by NBC Boston in advance of Boston Calling. They also announced the upcoming release of a live album recorded in Sweden during their early 2024 tour there. In April 2024, the band co-headlined shows with the Swinging Steaks, a Boston-based Americana/country/roots rock band; WHATO also announced that their US dates in 2024 would be billed as the "Keep Moving Forward Tour". In 2024, the band announced that they had recorded a live album in Sweden.

In May 2024, the band performed at the Boston Calling festival for the first time. The band promoted their then-upcoming appearance at Boston Calling with two appearances on Boston's local CBS affiliate WBZ, including one during which the band was interviewed and also performed "(Breaking Up With) My Hometown" and "Blink of an Eye" from South Shore. The band also promoted their Boston Calling appearance with a performance at WBUR CitySpace; Hayden also appeared twice on the show "Almost Famous Radio" on the local radio station WATD-FM and was interviewed by The Boston Globe and NBC Boston in advance of Boston Calling. WBUR, Boston's local NPR affiliate, included WHATO in its article about Boston Calling.

In June 2024, shortly after performing at Boston Calling, Hayden and Hall announced that longtime drummer Kiggans had decided to leave the band. Both Nilsen and Kiggans are featured on Live in Sweden and the Springsteen tribute albums. (Nilsen and Kiggans later joined the blues band GA-20.) The release of "Glory Days" on June 4, 2024, was timed to celebrate the 40th anniversary of the release of the original version by Springsteen on his 1984 album Born in the U.S.A.. On July 12, a "various artists" bluegrass tribute album to Bob Seger & The Silver Bullet Band was released, entitled Silver Bullet Bluegrass; Hayden (without the band) was the lead vocalist on "Betty Lou's Gettin' Out Tonight." Other concert festivals the band performed at during 2024 were the "Newburyport Brewing Country Fest" in Newburyport, MA and "The Moxie Festival" in Lisbon Falls, Maine.

Live in Sweden was ultimately released in August; two singles (live versions of their songs "Root Cellar" and "Mary Anne") were released in advance to promote the album. The band returned to Scandinavia again on tour from late August to early October 2024.

By late 2024, Crawford, Marshall, and drummer Patrick Brown had become official members of the band.

Little by Little, which is the first of two albums recorded as a tribute to Springsteen and his songwriting, was released in April 2025; it was preceded by the release of "The Promised Land", which they retitled to "Promised Land" (not to be confused with the Chuck Berry song of the same name they previously recorded in 2018). It includes the previously released singles "Dancing in the Dark" but not "Brilliant Disguise" or "Glory Days".

The companion album Piece by Piece was released in October 2025; it includes the band's previously released covers of "Brilliant Disguise" and "Glory Days" from 2024. Piece by Piece received a one-day pre-sale in August 2025 to celebrate distributor Bandacamp's "Bandcamp Friday" promotion. (Little by Little's final release date also took place on a Bandcamp Friday). "Jersey Girl" was also released as a single from Piece by Piece. Both Springsteen albums were recorded over the course of two years, and feature seven band members (Hayden, Kiggans, Nilsen, Hall, Brown, Crawford, and Marshall), plus other guest musicians.

== Members ==
=== Current members ===
- Ward Hayden — lead vocals, rhythm guitar, harmonica, double bass, drums (2005–present)
- Greg Hall – vocals, bass, double bass (2020–present)
- Sam Crawford – lead guitar, lap steel guitar (2024–present; touring musician earlier in 2024?)
- Tyler Marshall – vocals, lead and rhythm guitars (2024–present; touring musician earlier in 2024?)
- Patrick Brown – drums, percussion (2024–present; touring musician earlier in 2024?)

=== Former members ===
- Bruce Beagley — bass guitar (2005-2008)
- John Graham — drums (2005-2009)
- Colin Toomey – lead guitar (2006)
- Brendan Murphy – percussion (2006)
- Colt Thompson — harmony and backing vocals, lead guitar, rhythm guitar (2007-2010)
- Justin Maxwell — bass guitar, double bass (2009-2010)
- Michael Calabrese — drums, occasional guitar (2009-2012; one-off guest in 2014)
- Chris Hersch — vocals, lead guitar, banjo (2010-2016)
- Joe Keffler – rhythm guitar (2010)
- Paul Dilley — vocals, bass guitar, double bass, lead guitar, piano, Mellotron, drums, mandolin (2010–2020)
- Josh Kiggans — drums, mandolin, percussion, piano, occasional vocals (2012–2024)
- Cody Nilsen — vocals, lead guitar, pedal steel guitar, dobro, slide guitar, baritone guitar (2016–2024)

== Discography ==
=== Albums and EPs ===
==== 2000s ====
Title	Details	Peak positions	
Title	Details	AMA (US)	Roots Music Report (US)
Fireworks & Alcohol	Release date: January 11, 2006; Label: Independently released	—	—
Pretty Little Wrecking Ball	Release date: 2007; Label: Independently released	—	—
Inverted Valentine	Release date: 2008; Label: Independently released	8	2

==== 2010s ====
Title	Details	Peak positions			
Title	Details	AMA (US)	Roots Music Report (US) Roots Country Albums	NOR	NOR Country
Sweet Nothings	Release date: August 30, 2011; Label: Lonesome Day Records	18	20	—	—
Good Luck	Release date: January 28, 2014; Label: Lonesome Day Records, Proper (UK)	—	—	—	—
A Tribute to Hank Williams - Live!	Release date: February 24, 2015; Label: Sony RED, MRI, Dry Lightning Records	—	—	—	—
Love and Protest	Release date: November 4, 2016; Label: Independently released	21	—	5	1
Can't Judge A Book (EP)	Release date: September 1, 2018 (limited release at concerts); August 2019 (widespread release); Label: Independently released	—	—	—	—
"—" denotes releases that did not chart

==== 2020s ====
Title	Details	Peak positions	
Title	Details	AMA (US)	Roots Music Report (US) Top Country
Free Country	Release date: August 20, 2021; Label: Independently released; Format: CD, vinyl, digital downloads, streaming	—	—
South Shore	Release date: May 5, 2023; Label: Faster Horses Recordings; Format: CD, vinyl, digital downloads, streaming	—	43
Why Don't You Love Me (Live) (EP)	Release date: August 11, 2023; Label: Faster Horses Recordings	—	—
A Celebration of Hank Williams Live	Release date: September 1, 2023; Label: Faster Horses Recordings; Format: CD, vinyl, digital downloads, streaming	—	—
Live in Sweden	Release date: August 23, 2024; Label: Faster Horses Recordings; Format: Digital downloads, streaming, limited-edition vinyl (Note: This is the only recent album by the group not to have a CD release; this album is exclusive to digital downloading and streaming services, plus a limited-edition run of vinyl records.)	—	—
Little by Little	Release date: April 18, 2025; Label: Faster Horses Recordings; Format: CD, vinyl, digital downloads, streaming	31	— (Note: While Little by Little did not chart on Roots Music Report's Top Country Albums chart (or its Top Alternative Country Albums Chart), it did chart on their Top Rock Albums chart, where it peaked at #16, and on their Top Roots Rock Albums chart, where it peaked at #6.)
Piece by Piece	Release date: October 17, 2025; Label: Faster Horses Recordings; Format: CD, vinyl, digital downloads, streaming	—	—

=== Singles ===
- Mixed Messages (“Get As Gone Can Get” b/w “Baby Don’t Go”) (Sarah Borges with Girls, Guns, and Glory) (2014)
- "Rock 'n' Roll" (2016)
- "Badfish" (2023)
- "Write a Song" (2023)
- "(Breaking Up With) My Hometown" (2023)
- "I'll Never Get Out of This World Alive (Live)" (2023)
- "Long Gone Lonesome Blues (Live)" (2023)
- "Brilliant Disguise" (2024)
- “Dancing in the Dark” (2024)
- "Glory Days" (2024)
- "Root Cellar (Live)" (2024)
- "Mary Anne (Live)" (2024)
- "Promised Land" (2025)
- "Jersey Girl" (2025)
