= It Was a Home =

Studio album by KAINA
- Released: March 4, 2022
- Genre: R&B; soul; pop; latin
- Length: 42:17
- Language: English; Spanish
- Label: City Slang
- Producer: Kaina Castillo; Sen Morimoto

KAINA chronology
Next to the Sun (2019)	It Was a Home (2021)

Singles from It Was a Home
- 1. "Come Back as a Flower" Released: August 9, 2021; 2. "Casita" Released: September 15, 2021; 3. "Anybody Can Be in Love" Released: November 2, 2021; 4. "Apple" Released: January 19, 2022

It Was a Home is the second studio album by American singer and songwriter Kaina, which was released worldwide on March 4, 2022, through City Slang. The album was supported by four singles: "Come Back as a Flower", "Casita", "Anybody Can Be in Love", and "Apple". The album features Sen Morimoto, Sleater-Kinney, and Helado Negro.

== Release and promotion ==
Kaina announced It Was a Home on November 2, 2021, the same day she released her third single, "Anybody Can Be in Love". She also revealed an upcoming tour with tour dates in North America and Europe. The album was released on March 4, 2022, with a limited vinyl pressing in sun yellow and violet.

=== Singles ===
On August 9, 2021, Kaina released a cover of "Come Back as a Flower" by Stevie Wonder from his album Journey Through "The Secret Life of Plants" with a music video. This cover was considered the first single of Kaina's second studio album. On September 15, she released the second single, "Casita". The third single, "Anybody Can Be in Love", was released with the announcement of It Was a Home. "Apple" was the final single, released on January 19, 2022. A music video for "Golden Mirror" was released on March 6, 2022.

== Tour ==
It Was a Home Tour
- Tour by KAINA
- Associated album: It Was a Home
- Start date: March 16, 2022
- End date: July 17, 2022
- Legs: 1
- No. of shows: 25
- Supporting act: Helado Negro (May 20–25, 2022)

The It Was a Home Tour was Kaina's concert tour in support of It Was a Home. It was her first headlining concert tour. The North American leg commenced on March 16 and concluded on July 17, 2022. The tour would have included a European leg but it was cancelled for unknown reasons. Helado Negro supported on selected dates on the tour.

Date	City	Country	Venue	Opening act(s)
Leg 1 – North America
March 16–19, 2022	Austin	United States	SXSW	—N/a
March 25, 2022	Anaheim	United States	Parish Room at HOB	—N/a
March 26, 2022	Los Angeles	United States	The Echo	—N/a
April 28, 2022	Toronto	Canada	The Drake	Maddee
April 29, 2022	Montreal	Canada	La Sala Rossa	Thanya Iyer
April 30, 2022	Boston	United States	Cafe 939	Kara Jackson
May 3, 2022	Brooklyn	United States	Elsewhere Zone One	Isa Reyez
May 4, 2022	Philadelphia	United States	Milkboy	Grant Pavol
May 5, 2022	Washington, D.C.	United States	Songbyrd	FootsXColes
May 7, 2022	Atlanta	United States	The Eastern Rooftop	Hommeboy
May 8, 2022	Nashville	United States	The East Room	Bantug
May 20, 2022	Tucson	United States	Club Congress Plaza	—N/a
May 21, 2022	Santa Fe	United States	Meow Wolf	—N/a
May 23, 2022	Dallas	United States	Granada	—N/a
May 24, 2022	Houston	United States	White Oak Main Room	—N/a
May 25, 2022	Austin	United States	Mohawk	—N/a
June 11, 2022	San Diego	United States	Voodoo Room at HOB	—N/a
June 14, 2022	San Francisco	United States	Brick & Mortar	—N/a
June 17, 2022	Portland	United States	Polaris Hall	—N/a
June 18, 2022	Seattle	United States	Vera Project	—N/a
June 19, 2022	Vancouver	United States	Wise Hall	—N/a
July 17, 2022	Chicago	United States	Pitchfork	—N/a

== Reception ==
Professional ratings
Review scores
Source	Rating
Pitchfork	7.7/10
Loud and Quiet	8/10
Rolling Stone	3.5/5 stars

Gio Santiago of Pitchfork referred to the album as "a soothing progression from her debut and a soulful ode to the city and the relationships that have nourished KAINA's life".

For Loud and Quiet, Sam Walton wrote "you'll be hard-pressed to find a warmer, more welcoming collection of understated, open-hearted soul music this year".

== Track listing ==
All tracks are written by Kaina and Sen Morimoto except track 7, which was written by Stevie Wonder and Syreeta Wright.

It Was a Home track listing
No.	Title	Length
1.	"Anybody Can Be in Love"	2:58
2.	"It Was a Home"	3:36
3.	"Good Feeling" (feat. Sen Morimoto)	3:12
4.	"Sweetness"	3:13
5.	"In My Mind"	3:10
6.	"Ultraviolet" (feat. Sleater-Kinney)	2:48
7.	"Come Back as a Flower"	4:17
8.	"Blue" (feat. Helado Negro)	4:01
9.	"Casita"	3:40
10.	"Apple"	3:25
11.	"Friend of Mine"	4:20
12.	"Golden Mirror"	3:45
Total length:		42:17

== Release history ==
Release dates and formats for It Was a Home
Region	Date	Format(s)	Edition	Label	Ref.
Various	March 4, 2022	CD; vinyl; streaming; digital download	Standard	City Slang	
