= Kara Jackson =

American poet & musician (born 1999)

- Born: 1999 (age 26–27)
- Genres: Folk rock; indie folk; spoken word
- Occupations: Singer; songwriter; musician; poet
- Instruments: Vocals; guitar; banjo; piano
- Years active: 2019–present

Kara Jackson is an American singer, songwriter, musician, essayist and poet. She was the third U.S. National Youth Poet Laureate from 2019 and 2020.

In 2019, Jackson released her debut EP, A Song for Every Chamber of the Heart, which was followed by her debut studio album, Why Does the Earth Give Us People to Love?, in 2023. The album was released to widespread critical acclaim and appeared on several 'albums of the year' lists from Pitchfork, Rolling Stone and The Guardian, amongst others.

== Career ==
Kara Jackson is from Oak Park, Illinois and attended Oak Park River Forest High School, where she participated in spoken word. Jackson also participated in a jazz ensemble at Merit School of Music, and was the Youth Poet Laureate of Chicago in 2018. She performed at the Louder Than a Bomb 2018 finals and was selected by Patricia Smith for the Literary Award. In 2019, she was named the United States National Youth Poet Laureate after submitting an essay on poetry and democracy. In the same year, she published a chapbook of poetry, Bloodstone Cowboy. She studied English at Smith College, graduating in 2023. Her work has appeared in Poetry, Frontier Poetry, Rookie Mag, Nimrod Literary Journal, The Lily, and Saint Heron.

Jackson also made her musical debut in 2019 with the release of her EP, A Song for Every Chamber of the Heart. Her first full-length album, Why Does the Earth Give Us People to Love? was released in 2023 to much acclaim, being named Best New Music by Pitchfork. Jackson provided vocals, guitar, banjo, and piano on the album, and collaborated with musicians Kaina, Nnamdi Ogbonnaya, and Sen Morimoto on lyrics and production. The album was dedicated to, and inspired by, Jackson's friend Maya-Gabrielle Gary, who died from cancer in 2016. Jackson has listed Joanna Newsom, Joni Mitchell, Megan Thee Stallion, Joan Baez, Jim Croce, and Ella Fitzgerald as musical inspirations. In 2023, she also opened for Corinne Bailey Rae's Black Rainbows tour, and appeared on Kevin Abstract's Blanket.

On January 15, 2026, she was featured on "Orange County", a track on virtual rock band Gorillaz' ninth studio album, The Mountain. On May 19 of the same year, she was featured in lead single of the companion album to the film Is God Is.

== Publications ==
- Bloodstone Cowboy (Haymarket Books, 2019)

== Discography ==
Studio albums

- Why Does the Earth Give Us People to Love? (2023)

EPs

- A Song for Every Chamber of the Heart (2019)
