= Brat (Nnamdï album) =

Studio album by Nnamdï
- Released: April 3, 2020
- Genres: Alternative hip hop; indie pop; math rock
- Length: 41:04
- Label: Sooper Records
- Producers: Nnamdi Ogbonnaya; Conor Mackey

Nnamdï chronology
Drool (2017)	Brat (2020)	Krazy Karl (2020)

Professional ratings
Review scores
Source	Rating
Pitchfork	7.3/10

Brat is the fourth studio album by American musician Nnamdï. It was released on April 3, 2020, through Sooper Records.

== Track listing ==
No.	Title	Length
1.	"Flowers to My Demons"	2:51
2.	"Gimme Gimme"	3:11
3.	"Bullseye"	1:53
4.	"Everyone I Loved"	3:40
5.	"Wasted"	4:24
6.	"Glass Casket"	4:02
7.	"Perfect in My Mind"	4:34
8.	"Semantics"	3:37
9.	"Price Went Up"	2:08
10.	"Really Don't"	1:39
11.	"It's OK"	3:45
12.	"Salut"	5:20
Total length:		41:04

== Personnel ==
- Macie Stewart & Augustine Esterhammer-Fic – Strings on Tracks 1 & 7
- Mallory Linehan – Strings on Track 3
- Amanda Bailey & Victoria Lee – Strings on Tracks 4 & 12
- Julia Steiner – Bridge vocals on Track 5
- Connor Bernhard & Sen Morimoto – Horns on Track 7
- Collin Clauson – End synth on Track 8

Production

- Written, produced, and recorded by Nnamdï
- Mixed by Steve Marek
- Mastered by Dan Millice
- Track 11 co-produced by Conor Mackey
