= Kiggans =

Kiggans is a surname. Notable people with the surname include:

- Jen Kiggans (born 1971), American politician
- Josh Kiggans (fl. 2014), American drummer
