= GA-20 =

American blues band

- Origin: Boston, Massachusetts, U.S.
- Genres: Blues; Chicago blues
- Years active: 2018–present
- Labels: Colemine Records/Karma Chief Records (2019–2026); Alligator Records (2021); New West Records (2026-Present)
- Members: Matthew Stubbs; Josh Kiggans; Cody Nilsen
- Past members: Pat Faherty; Tim Carman
- Website: https://ga20band.com/

GA-20 is an American blues band from Boston, Massachusetts consisting of Matthew Stubbs, Cody Nilsen, and Josh Kiggans. The band is named after the guitar amplifier manufactured by Gibson from 1950 to 1961. They primarily play Chicago blues.

In 2018, GA-20 were nominated for a Boston Music Award for Blues Artist of the year. They have been nominated for the award eight years in a row. They won Blues Artist of the Year in 2019, 2021, 2022, 2023, 2024, and 2025. They were nominated for their first Blues Music Award in 2022 for Best Emerging Artist. In 2023 GA-20 was nominated for Blues Band of the year and their album Live In Loveland was nominated for Live Blues Album by the Blues Blast Awards. They won Blues Act of the Year at the 2024 New England Music Awards.

== Background ==
Matthew Stubbs formed GA-20 in early 2018 during a hiatus from playing guitar with Charlie Musselwhite, due to Musselwhite touring with Ben Harper. Stubbs sought to put a new project together to do blues gigs aside from his psych-rock group The Antiguas. Stubbs met original vocalist Pat Faherty through his many local Boston gigs. Faherty was a regular at these gigs and even took blues guitar lessons from Stubbs. Early performances by the band had a rotating group of musicians with Faherty and Stubbs as the core members. Some early performances used various other musicians, sometimes playing as a four-piece band. They adopted the name GA-20 and the group became a trio by early 2018 consisting of two guitars (Stubbs & Faherty) and drums (sideman Tim Carman). About a year after their formation, they scored a deal with Colemine Records imprint Karma Chief Records. The group has been described as a trio that plays stripped down 1950s/1960s-style Chicago blues with a lot of distortion and no bass.

== Career ==
After signing with Colemine/Karma Chief Records in December 2018, the band released the single "Naggin' On My Mind" which featured Charlie Musselwhite and Luther Dickinson. It was recorded at Q Division Studios in Somerville, Massachusetts and was produced by Stubbs. Musselwhite performed harmonica on the track, Dickinson was on slide guitar. During the session Matthew Prozialeck provided background vocals and played harmonica on what would become the B-side to "Naggin' On My Mind". Additional recordings from this session became the Lonely Soul album. Stubbs and Faherty co-wrote the original material featured on Lonely Soul. Their co-writing collaboration would continue through subsequent releases until Faherty’s 2024 departure.

Their first record, a 7" single, was released in August 2019 with "Naggin' On My Mind" and "Sit Down Baby" on Karma Chief Records. Their debut album Lonely Soul was released on October 18, 2019. The album debuted at number 2 on the Billboard Blues Chart. In September 2020 they released an EP called GA-20 Live Vol. 1. The EP debuted at number 1 on the Billboard Blues Chart.

Their August 2021 album GA-20 Does Hound Dog Taylor: Try It...You Might Like It! also debuted at number 1 on the Billboard Blues Chart of September 4, 2021 and was the first album ever to be played in its entirety on the Dr Boogie radio show. Released to mark the 50th anniversary of Hound Dog Taylor and the HouseRockers, Taylor's first disc, the GA-20 tracks are cover versions of songs from both that album and Taylor's second record Natural Boogie. The album is a co-release by Colemine/Karma Chief Records and the legendary Blues label Alligator Records (Hound Dog Taylor's label). The album received 4-star reviews in both The Guardian and Rolling Stone France.

In September 2022 the band released the studio album Crackdown which debuted at number 1 on the Billboard Blues Chart. They followed up Crackdown with the live record Live In Loveland, which debuted at number 2 on the Billboard Blues Chart.

In July 2024, it was announced that Tim Carman would be replaced, on drums, by Josh Kiggans. In December 2024, it was announced that Pat Faherty had parted ways from the band due to artistic differences, and that Cody Nilsen would take his place moving forward. Nilsen is an acclaimed touring, session, and solo musician. Nilsen's debut with the band, "Cryin' & Pleadin'", was released December 10, 2024. "Cryin' & Pleadin'" reached number 1 on B.B. King's Bluesville Top 15 Rack of Blues in March 2025. It remained at number 1 for five consecutive weeks. In May of 2025 the EP GA-20 Volume 2 was released. Volume 2 was followed by the LP Orphans, released in December of 2025.

In early 2026 the band announced they had signed to New West Records and were releasing a full length album featuring Charlie Musselwhite. The first single "Crazy Love" was released April 30th, 2026. Two additional singles, "I Can't Hold Out" and "I'll Change My Style" were issued ahead of the LP/CD release date of July 31st, 2026. The band also began appearing at select festivals along side Musselwhite in 2026.

== Band members ==
Current members

- Matthew Stubbs – guitar (2018–present)
- Josh Kiggans – drums (2024–present)
- Cody Nilsen – lead vocals, guitar (2024–present)

Past members

- Pat Faherty – lead vocals, guitar (2018–2024)
- Tim Carman – drums (2019–2024)

== Discography ==
Singles
Act	Release title	Catalogue	Year	Fmt	Notes
GA-20 featuring Charlie Musselwhite and Luther Dickinson	"Naggin’ On My Mind"	Karma Chief Records KCR12004dig1	December 2018	Digital	
GA-20 featuring Charlie Musselwhite and Luther Dickinson	"Naggin’ On My Mind" / "Sit Down Baby"	Karma Chief Records KCR-105	August 2019	Vinyl, Digital	
GA-20	"I Ain't Got You"	Karma Chief Records KCR-12004	July 2020	Digital	
GA-20	"No No"	Karma Chief Records KCR-001	April 2021	Digital	
GA-20	"No No" / "Two In The Ground"	Karma Chief Records KCR-120	September 2022	Vinyl, Digital	
GA-20	"ATL"	Karma Chief Records KCR-002	November 2022	Digital	
GA-20	"Jolene" / "Still As The Night"	Karma Chief Records KCR-128	September 2023	Vinyl, Digital	
GA-20	"Cryin' & Pleadin'"	KCR-005; GA20-002	December 2024	Digital	
GA-20	"I Love You, I Need You"	KCR-005; GA20-002	February 2025	Digital	
GA-20	"Stranger Blues"	GA20-002	March 2025	Digital	
GA-20	"Hold On, I'm Coming"	GA20-002	August 2025	Digital	
GA-20	"My Baby Sweeter"	GA20-002	September 2025	Digital	
GA-20	"Just One More Time"	GA20-002	November 2025	Digital	
GA-20 with Charlie Musselwhite	"Crazy Love"	New West Records NW7068	April 2026	Digital	
GA-20 with Charlie Musselwhite	"I Can't Hold Out"	New West Records NW7068	May 2026	Digital	
GA-20 with Charlie Musselwhite	"I'll Change My Style"	New West Records NW7068	June 2026	Digital	

Albums/EPs
Release title	Catalogue	Year	Fmt	Notes
Lonely Soul	Karma Chief Records KCR12004	October 2019	LP, CD, Cassette, Digital	Debut on Billboard Blues Albums at No. 2
GA-20 Live Vol. 1	Karma Chief Records KCR110	September 2020	EP, CD, Digital	Debut on Billboard Blues Albums at No. 1
GA-20 Does Hound Dog Taylor: Try It...You Might Like It!	Karma Chief Records KCR12017	August 2021	LP, CD, Digital	Debut on Billboard Blues Albums at No. 1
GA-20 Does Hound Dog Taylor LIVE!	Karma Chief Records KCR12017	December 2021	EP, CD, Digital	
Crackdown	Karma Chief Records KCR12007	September 2022	LP, CD, Digital	Debut on Billboard Blues Albums at No. 1
Live In Loveland	Karma Chief Records KCR12016	March 2023	LP, CD, Digital	Debut on Billboard Blues Albums at No. 2
GA-20 Volume 2	GA20-002	May 2025	EP, CD, Digital	
Orphans	GA20-002	December 2025	LP, CD, Digital	
Blues Now	New West Records NW7068 [LP]; NW6626 [CD]	July 2026	LP, CD, Digital	
