= Ogbonnaya =

- Gender: Male
- Language(s): Igbo

Origin
- Word/name: Nigeria
- Meaning: His father's confidant.

Ogbonnaya audiois a Nigerian name of Igbo origin.

== Notable people with the name include ==
- Chris Ogbonnaya (born 1986), American football running back
- Nnamdi Ogbonnaya (born 1990), American multi-instrumentalist musician
- Ogbonnaya Onu (born 1951), Nigerian politician, author, and engineer
