= Stevie Wonder's Journey Through "The Secret Life of Plants" =

1979 soundtrack album by Stevie Wonder

Soundtrack album by Stevie Wonder
- Released: October 30, 1979
- Studios: I.A.M. (Irvine); Crystal (Hollywood); Lyon (Newport Beach); Sigma Sound (Philadelphia); Motown (Hollywood); Studio in the Country (Bogalusa)
- Genres: Pop; R&B
- Length: 87:52
- Label: Tamla
- Producer: Stevie Wonder

Stevie Wonder chronology
Looking Back (1977)	Stevie Wonder's Journey Through "The Secret Life of Plants" (1979)	Hotter than July (1980)

Singles from Stevie Wonder's Journey Through "The Secret Life of Plants"
- 1. "Send One Your Love" Released: November 1979; 2. "Black Orchid" Released: February 1980; 3. "Outside My Window" Released: May 1980

Stevie Wonder's Journey Through "The Secret Life of Plants" is an album by Stevie Wonder, originally released on the Tamla Motown label on October 30, 1979. It is the soundtrack to the documentary The Secret Life of Plants, directed by Walon Green, which was based on the book of the same name by Peter Tompkins and Christopher Bird. It contains two singles that reached the Billboard Hot 100 charts: "Send One Your Love" (No. 4) and the minor hit "Outside My Window" (No. 52). The single "Black Orchid" reached No. 63 in the UK.

== Production ==
Wonder created the film score by having Michael Braun, the film's producer, describe each visual image in detail, while the sound engineer, Gary Olazabal, specified the length of a passage. This information was processed to a four-track tape (with the film's sound on one of the tracks), leaving Wonder space to add his own musical accompaniment. Wonder attempted to translate the complex information of the book and film into song lyrics. "Same Old Story," for example, tries to convey the scientific findings of Jagadish Chandra Bose, who developed instruments to measure plants' response to stimuli, and the breakthroughs of American agriculturalist George Washington Carver. While written mostly by Stevie Wonder, some songs were collaborations with Syreeta Wright, Yvonne Wright, and Michael Sembello.

Journey Through "The Secret Life of Plants" contained new synthesizer combinations, including the first use of a digital sampling synthesizer, the Computer Music Melodian, used in most tracks of this album. Journey is an early digital recording, released three months after Ry Cooder's Bop till You Drop, generally believed to be the first digitally recorded popular music album, with this album being the second. Stevie Wonder was an early adherent of the technology and used it for all his subsequent recordings. The music was recorded onto U-matic video tapes using a Sony PCM-1600 digital PCM adaptor, and edited with a digital controller also from Sony.

== Packaging ==
Tamla/Motown originally released the album as a double LP in a tri-fold sleeve. The front cover was embossed, and following Wonder's recent trend of printing Braille messages on his albums, the cover illustration was captioned below in Braille for blind readers:

⠄⠁⠃⠧ ⠯ ⠔⠎⠊⠙⠑ ⠮ ⠑⠍⠃⠕⠎⠎⠫ ⠎⠟⠥⠜⠑ ⠊⠎ ⠮ ⠳⠞⠇⠔⠑ ⠷ ⠁ ⠋⠇⠪⠻ ⠾ ⠧⠑⠔⠫ ⠇⠂⠧⠑⠎⠲
⠠⠌⠑⠧⠊⠑ ⠠⠺⠕⠝⠙⠻⠄⠎ ⠄⠚⠳⠗⠝⠑⠽ ⠄⠐⠹ ⠠⠮ ⠠⠎⠑⠉⠗⠑⠞ ⠠⠇⠊⠋⠑ ⠷ ⠠⠰⠏⠇⠁⠝⠞⠎⠲
"Above and inside the embossed square is the outline of a flower with veined leaves. Stevie Wonder's Journey Through The Secret Life of Plants."

Initial pressings of the album were scented with a floral perfume, but this was discontinued after it was discovered that the perfume damaged the vinyl.

== Release ==
After Stevie Wonder's previous albums Innervisions (1973), Fulfillingness' First Finale (1974), and Songs in the Key of Life (1976) all won the Grammy Award for Album of the Year, his next project was highly anticipated, and Motown marketed it aggressively. Although the Secret Life of Plants documentary film never received a wide release, Wonder's soundtrack album went all the way up to number four in the Rock and R&B Billboard charts in 1979 and was also certified platinum by Productores de Música de España, while the single "Send One Your Love" also reached number four. However, sales tapered off quickly, and label head Berry Gordy reportedly complained that the one million copies he pressed turned out to be 900,000 too many.

== Promotion ==
Wonder supported the album in late 1979 with a six-city tour, performing nearly the entire album live with his band Wonderlove and the National Afro-American Philharmonic Orchestra (conducted by James Frazier Jr.). Reflecting the orchestra's presence and the album's atmospheric tone, the tour venues included concert halls and opera houses. The shows began with the Plants music (partially accompanied by film projections), followed by a second half spanning his career hits.

Date	City	Venue
November 28, 1979	Chicago, Illinois	Auditorium Theatre
November 29, 1979	Detroit, Michigan	Ford Auditorium
November 30, 1979	Detroit, Michigan	Cobo Arena
December 2, 1979	New York, New York	Metropolitan Opera House
December 3, 1979	Philadelphia, Pennsylvania	Academy of Music
December 4, 1979	Washington, D.C.	DAR Constitution Hall
December 9, 1979	New York, New York	Madison Square Garden
December 18, 1979	Pasadena, California	Civic Auditorium

== Reception ==
Professional ratings
Review scores
Source	Rating
AllMusic	3.5/5 stars
Baltimore Sun	(favorable)
Christgau's Record Guide	B−
DownBeat	2/5 stars
Music Week	4/4 stars
New York Times	(favorable)
Pitchfork	7.7/10
Rolling Stone	(mixed)
Rolling Stone	4/5 stars
Smash Hits	6/10

Journey Through "The Secret Life of Plants" has sometimes been considered a "vague" and "overambitious" album; it has been called "goofy", "nerdy", "odd", "pointless" and "foolish", and for some listeners and critics it was seen as too much of a departure from his string of melodic albums. However, some critics have also described it as "courageous", "achingly sweet", and "bafflingly beautiful". Stephen Holden in a review for the Village Voice remarked that the album has "the painful awkwardness of a barely literate sidewalk sermon", though Wonder "manages to transform even the worst of this drivel into a spiritual jargon that's virtually a different language; his very in-articulateness clears the way for us to tune in to the ineffable, nonrational flow that's his obsession."

Wonder remarked in 2004 that the album "was an experimental project with me scoring and doing other things I like: challenging myself with all the things that entered my mind from the Venus's Flytrap to Earth's creation to coming back as a flower."

The cover of the album was selected by Rolling Stone in 1991 for their list of 100 Classic Album Covers as a memorable example of album art.

Cash Box said "Outside My Window" was a "truly joyous, pastoral love song, utilizing the universal image of the flower to lyrically represent all that is fair and beautiful in nature." Record World said of it that "A deep, dense bassline is mixed alongside Wonder's uplifting vocals on this mid-tempo track."

Solange Knowles named it as an influence on her 2019 album When I Get Home.

KAINA covered the song "Come Back as a Flower" on her 2022 album It Was a Home.

== Track listing ==
All lyrics are written by Stevie Wonder, except where noted; all music is composed by Wonder.

Side one
No.	Title	Length
1.	"Earth's Creation" (instrumental)	4:05
2.	"The First Garden" (instrumental)	2:33
3.	"Voyage to India" (instrumental)	6:23
4.	"Same Old Story"	3:45
5.	"Venus' Flytrap and the Bug"	2:24
6.	"Ai No, Sono"	2:05
Total length:		21:15

Side two
No.	Title	Lyrics	Length
1.	"Seasons"		2:53
2.	"Power Flower"	Michael Sembello	5:31
3.	"Send One Your Love (Music)" (instrumental)		3:05
4.	"Race Babbling"		8:51
Total length:			20:20

Side three
No.	Title	Lyrics	Length
1.	"Send One Your Love"		4:02
2.	"Outside My Window"		5:29
3.	"Black Orchid"	Yvonne Wright	3:48
4.	"Ecclesiastes" (instrumental)		3:44
5.	"Kesse Ye Lolo De Ye"		3:00
6.	"Come Back as a Flower"	Syreeta Wright	3:23
Total length:			23:26

Side four
No.	Title	Lyrics	Length
1.	"A Seed's a Star" / "Tree Medley"	Wonder / Wonder; Stephanie Andrews	5:41
2.	"The Secret Life of Plants"		4:28
3.	"Tree" (instrumental)		5:55
4.	"Finale" (instrumental)		6:47
Total length:			22:51

Notes:

- Lead vocals on "Come Back as a Flower" performed by Syreeta Wright.
- "Come Back as a Flower" is 4:59 on some CD editions.

== Personnel ==
- Stevie Wonder – instruments, synthesizer, vocals
- Syreeta Wright – vocals on "Come Back as a Flower"
- Bill Wolfer, Clark Spangler, Gordon Bahary – synthesizer, sequencer, programming
- Ben Bridges, Michael Sembello, Rick Zunigar – guitar
- Nathan Watts, Henry Franklin – bass
- Ron Kersey – Fender Rhodes on "A Seed's a Star/Tree Medley"
- Dennis Davis – electronic drums on "A Seed's a Star/Tree Medley"
- Earl DeRouen – congas, bongos, backing vocals on "A Seed's a Star/Tree Medley"
- Joe Johnson – bells on "A Seed's a Star/Tree Medley"
- Ibrahim Camara – djembe, congas, bells, drums, vocals on "Kesse Ye Lolo De Ye"
- Lamine Konté – kora, vocals on "Kesse Ye Lolo De Ye"
- Josie James – vocals on "Race Babbling"
- Táta Vega – vocals on "A Seed's a Star/Tree Medley"

== Charts ==
Chart performance for Stevie Wonder's Journey Through "The Secret Life of Plants"
Chart (1979)	Peak position
Australian Albums (Kent Music Report)	24
Dutch Albums (Album Top 100)	12
German Albums (Offizielle Top 100)	33
New Zealand Albums (RMNZ)	16
Norwegian Albums (VG-lista)	8
Swedish Albums (Sverigetopplistan)	13
UK Albums (Official Charts)	8
US Billboard 200	4
US Top R&B/Hip-Hop Albums (Billboard)	4

== Certifications ==
Certifications for Stevie Wonder's Journey Through "The Secret Life of Plants"
Region	Certification	Certified units/sales
Canada (Music Canada)	Gold	50,000^{^}
Netherlands (NVPI)	Gold	50,000^{^}
Spain (Promusicae)	Platinum	100,000^{^}
United Kingdom (BPI)	Gold	100,000^{^}
^{^} Shipments figures based on certification alone.

== See also ==
- Mother Earth's Plantasia, 1976 album by Mort Garson
