= Sunshine and Balance Beams =

Studio album by Pile
- Released: August 15, 2025
- Studio: Machines with Magnets (Pawtucket)
- Genre: Rock
- Length: 42:03
- Label: Sooper

Pile chronology
All Fiction (2023)	Sunshine and Balance Beams (2025)

Singles from Sunshine and Balance Beams
- 1. "Born at Night" Released: May 13, 2025; 2. "Uneasy" Released: June 10, 2025; 3. "Bouncing in Blue" Released: July 15, 2025

Sunshine and Balance Beams is the ninth studio album by American indie rock band Pile. It was released on August 15, 2025, via Sooper Records in LP, CD, cassette and digital formats.

== Background ==
Sunshine and Balance Beams was the first album by the band released through Sooper.

"Born at Night" was released as the first single on May 13, 2025, alongside a music video directed by Josh Echevarria. It was followed by "Uneasy" and "Bouncing in Blue", the second and third singles, on June 10 and July 15, 2025, together with music videos directed by Stefan Fernandez.

== Reception ==
Professional ratings
Review scores
Source	Rating
New Noise	3.5/5 stars
Pitchfork	7.9/10

Margaret Farrell of Stereogum described Sunshine and Balance Beams as "a Sisyphean concept album" that is "lyrically built around plunging us into a dense forest with the hope we'll reach relief and replenishing light after we make it out" and "isn't easy listening, but that's what makes rewards feel so earned."

The Pitchfork critic Zach Schonfeld referred to it as "undoubtedly a Pile album" and "how well it traverses both paths, restoring the pummeling post-hardcore roar that fans have missed while integrating it with swooning strings and pockets of tenderness" as "impressive, even a bit confounding."

New Noise described it as feeling "like a point of revisitation which nonetheless proceeds on a new path rather than merely retracing old footprints" and resonating "as a work deeply rooted in Pile's collective legacy, with the potential to serve as an artistic address to longtime supporters and new fans alike."

BrooklynVegan referred to the album as "just Pile staying true to what they've always believed in most, and continuing their ever-gradual evolution in the process," commenting that it "has nothing to do with the increased interest in '90s nostalgia."

== Track listing ==
All tracks are written by Richard Maguire.

Sunshine and Balance Beams track listing
No.	Title	Length
1.	"Balance Beams"	0:58
2.	"An Opening"	3:09
3.	"Deep Clay"	4:13
4.	"A Loosened Knot"	5:19
5.	"Bouncing in Blue"	5:37
6.	"Uneasy"	2:35
7.	"Holds"	4:15
8.	"Born at Night"	5:29
9.	"Meanwhile Outside"	8:18
10.	"Carrion Song"	3:10
Total length:		42:03

== Personnel ==
Credits adapted from the album's liner notes.

=== Pile ===
- Matt Connery – guitar, production
- Kris Kuss – drums, auxiliary percussion, production
- Alex Molini – bass, synthesizer, Rhodes, piano, production
- Rick Maguire – vocals, guitar, synthesizer, production (all tracks); string composition (tracks 1, 2, 5, 7, 8, 10)

=== Additional contributors ===
- Candace Clement – background vocals
- Eden Rayz – string composition and arrangement (tracks 1, 2, 5, 7, 8, 10), cello
- Greg Martin – string composition and arrangement (track 10)
- Josh Knowles – violin
- Francesca Caruso – violin
- John Snyder – violin
- Anna Stromer – viola
- Kira McSpice – cello
- Miranda Serra – recording, production
- Seth Manchester – mixing
- Alex Molini – additional editing
- Matt Colton – mastering
- Mark Lapriore – all photography
- Izzi Vasquez – album layout, design
