= Chris Hersch =

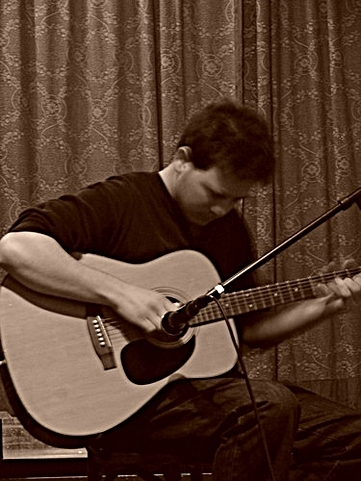

Background information
- Born: 1982; Orefield, Pennsylvania
- Genres: Americana
- Occupation: Musician
- Instrument: Guitar
- Years active: 2004–present
- Labels: Lonesome Day
- Website: www.chrishersch.com

Chris Hersch (born 1982, in Orefield, Pennsylvania) is a Boston-based guitarist.

From 2000–2004, Hersch attended the New England Conservatory of Music, where his teachers included John Abercrombie, Ben Monder, Jerry Bergonzi, John McNeil, and Steve Lacey. He also studied banjo and Americana.

== Biography ==
From 2004 to 2012, Hersch taught guitar, banjo, and music at schools in the Boston area. Also during that time, Hersch served as chair of the Guitar Department at the Powers Music School.

From 2010 to 2016, Hersch joined Girls Guns and Glory as the lead guitar player and toured with them in America and Europe. He won Best Americana Act of the Year from the Boston Music Awards and Independent Artist of the Year from the French Country Music Awards.

In 2014, Rolling Stone magazine selected Girls Guns and Glory in "Ten New Artists You Need to Know".

He is also the founding member of the Honky Tonk Trucker Jazz and Western Swing band Chris Hersch & The MoonRaiders. Hersch is also co-founder of Say Darling, a rock and roll, blues, and soul band featuring Celia Woodsmith] of Della Mae.

Hersch currently teaches lessons at the Powers Music School and at his private studio.
