= Send One Your Love =

Single by Stevie Wonder

from the album Stevie Wonder's Journey Through "The Secret Life of Plants"
- B-side: "Send One Your Love (Instrumental)"
- Released: November 1979
- Recorded: 1979
- Genre: Soul; pop
- Length: 4:01
- Label: Tamla
- Songwriter: Stevie Wonder
- Producer: Stevie Wonder

Stevie Wonder singles chronology
"Pops, We Love You" (1978)	"Send One Your Love" (1979)	"Black Orchid" (1980)

"Send One Your Love" is a 1979 soul single by American and Motown musician and singer Stevie Wonder from his album Stevie Wonder's Journey Through "The Secret Life of Plants" (1979). Released in November 1979 as the album's lead single, the song reached number four on the US Billboard pop singles chart in 1979. The song also became Wonder's second single to top the adult contemporary chart, following 1973's "You Are the Sunshine of My Life", topping the chart for four weeks. On the soul charts, "Send One Your Love" went to number five.

Cash Box said that it has "an unusual sound that gets better each time you hear it," with an "off-beat percussive background and an unusual lyrical structure." Record World called it "an oldfashioned love song straight from the heart."

== Chart performance ==
=== Weekly charts ===
Chart (1979–1980)	Peak position
Canada RPM Top Singles	7
Canada RPM Adult Contemporary	12
Netherlands	45
New Zealand	29
UK Singles (OCC)	52
U.S. Billboard Hot 100	4
U.S. Billboard Adult Contemporary	1
U.S. Billboard R&B	5
U.S. Cash Box Top 100	5

=== Year-end charts ===
Chart (1979)	Rank
U.S. Cash Box	75

Chart (1980)	Rank
Canada	74
U.S. Billboard Hot 100	43

== See also ==
- List of number-one adult contemporary singles of 1979 (U.S.)
