= Josh Kiggans =

American drummer

Josh Kiggans is an American drummer. He is known for his work recording and touring with Girls Guns and Glory, Sarah Borges, Ward Hayden and The Outliers, and GA-20.
