= Green and Gray =

Studio album by Pile
- Released: May 3, 2019
- Genre: Rock
- Length: 49:21
- Label: Exploding in Sound

Pile chronology
A Hairshirt of Purpose (2017)	Green and Gray (2019)

Professional ratings
Aggregate scores
Source	Rating
Metacritic	78/100
Review scores
Source	Rating
The 405	6.5/10
AllMusic	3.5/5 stars
Exclaim!	8/10
Now	4/5
Pitchfork	7.9/10

Green and Gray is the seventh studio album by American indie rock band Pile. It was released on May 3, 2019, through Exploding in Sound.

== Critical reception ==
Green and Gray was met with generally favorable reviews from critics. At Metacritic, which assigns a weighted average rating out of 100 to reviews from mainstream publications, this release received an average score of 78, based on 5 reviews. The reviews considered the album's musical and stylistic elements, with individual assessments varying among publications. The Metacritic score reflects the reviews included in its aggregation and does not represent the views of all critics. The album was subsequently covered by other music publications and reviewers.

== Track listing ==
Green and Gray track listing
No.	Title	Length
1.	"Firewood"	5:13
2.	"Your Performance"	2:53
3.	"On a Bigger Screen"	2:39
4.	"Other Moons"	1:31
5.	"Hair"	4:25
6.	"A Labyrinth With No Center"	4:33
7.	"The Soft Hands of Stephen Miller"	2:05
8.	"Lord of Calendars"	4:47
9.	"Bruxist Grin"	3:36
10.	"A Bug on Its Back"	2:27
11.	"My Employer"	3:06
12.	"Hiding Places"	7:22
13.	"No Hands"	4:44

== Charts ==
Chart	Peak position
US Heatseekers Albums (Billboard)	3
US Independent Albums (Billboard)	42
