= Matthew Stubbs =

American blues guitarist

- Genres: Blues, psychedelic rock, surf rock, instrumental rock
- Occupation: Guitarist
- Labels: Matthew Stubbs, Blue Bella Records

Matthew Stubbs is an American blues guitarist. He is best known as the lead guitarist for Charlie Musselwhite and GA-20.

== Background ==
Stubbs has been Charlie Musselwhite's lead guitarist since 2008, and as of 2017 had been with the band for a decade. They toured all over the world. Stubbs has also backed up and toured with such Blues giants as John Hammond, James Cotton, Junior Watson, and James Harman. With Musselwhite, he played on two live albums. Juke Joint Chapel was nominated for a Grammy in 2012. He has released three albums under his own name, one with The Antiguas. He has won several Boston Music Awards. In 2018 he formed the band GA-20, their first single was released in 2019.

== Career ==
=== The Antiguas ===
The group came about after Stubbs was writing some new material that differed from what he had done in the past. The music he was listening to was a lot of afrobeat, psych-rock, garage rock, and blues. They debuted with a self-titled album that sounded like a soundtrack to an action/spy film. As of August 2017, Stubbs and his group, The Antiguas were playing free shows every week for Downbeat Mondays on Church St., Cambridge at The Sinclair's restaurant.

In August 2018, they were at Cambridge's Middle East Restaurant and Nightclub, opening for surf legend, Dick Dale.

== GA-20 ==
Stubbs formed GA-20 in the fall of 2017. About a year after their formation, they scored a deal with Colemine Records imprint Karma Chief Records. In early 2019, their debut single "Naggin’ on My Mind" was out. GA-20's debut album was released in October of 2019 on Karma Chief Records and debuted at number 2 on the Billboard Blues Charts. GA-20 has seven releases under the Karma Chief Records imprint including three number 1 and two number 2 Billboard Blues albums. The group continues to record and release music with Stubbs acting as producer.

== Discography ==
Albums
Act	Release title	Catalogue	Year	Fmt	Notes #
Matthew Stubbs	Soul Bender	Matthew Stubbs MS 1001	2008	CD	Distributed by VizzTone Label Group
Matthew Stubbs	Medford & Main	Blue Bella Records BBCD 1013	2010	CD	
Matthew Stubbs & The Antiguas	Matthew Stubbs & The Antiguas	(No label) 59696 45031	2017	LP	
GA-20	Lonely Soul	Karma Chief Records KCR 12004	2019	LP/CD	

With other artists
Act	Release title	Catalogue	Year	Fmt	Notes #
Charlie Musselwhite	Juke Joint Chapel (live)	Henrietta Records 880074 226229	2012	CD-R	
Charlie Musselwhite	I Ain’t Lyin' (live)	Henrietta Records 725518 212485	2015	CD-R	
