= Hound Dog Taylor and the HouseRockers =

Studio album by Hound Dog Taylor and the HouseRockers
- Released: 1971
- Recorded: 1971
- Studio: Sound Studios, Chicago, Illinois
- Genre: Chicago blues
- Length: 42:38
- Label: Alligator
- Producer: Bruce Iglauer

Hound Dog Taylor and the HouseRockers chronology
Hound Dog Taylor and the HouseRockers (1971)	Natural Boogie (1973)

Professional ratings
Review scores
Source	Rating
AllMusic	5/5 stars
Christgau's Record Guide	A−
The Penguin Guide to Blues Recordings	3.5/4 stars

Hound Dog Taylor and the HouseRockers is the 1971 debut album of Hound Dog Taylor.

Originally issued on LP as the first release on the Alligator label, it has subsequently been reissued on CD.

== Recording ==
As Taylor's debut album, Hound Dog Taylor and the HouseRockers was the first recording issued on the Alligator label. The label was founded by Bruce Iglauer for the specific purpose of releasing an album of Taylor's music after he had been unable to persuade Bob Koester, then his boss at Delmark, to record Taylor.

The album, recorded at Sound Studios, Chicago, features only three musicians: Taylor himself on vocals and slide guitar, Brewer Phillips on guitar and Ted Harvey on drums. For solos, the two guitarists alternate between playing lead and accompanying the other guitarist.

Further material from the same sessions was released on the posthumous album Genuine Houserocking Music.

== Release and promotion ==
The record sold 9,000 copies in its first year, a large number for a blues record on an independent label, and by 1998 had sold around 100,000 copies. At the time of the recording, Taylor was playing locally in taverns, but the higher profile the album's success gave him enabled him to obtain work further afield, eventually touring as far away as Australia.

== Critical reception ==
Cub Koda, writing for AllMusic, described it as "wild, raucous, crazy music straight out of the South Side clubs", and called it "one of the greatest slide guitar albums of all time". The Penguin Guide to Blues Recordings describes its sound as "loud, harsh, boxy and exciting". Reviewing in Christgau's Record Guide: Rock Albums of the Seventies (1981), Robert Christgau called the album "electronic gutbucket from the Chicago blues bars, the rawest record I've heard in years. Taylor makes a neoprimitivist showboat like James Cotton sound like a cross between Don Nix and the Harmonicats, and about time. N.b.: a guitar-playing friend tells me the axe Hound Dog brandishes on the cover is the cheapest you can buy."

== Track listing ==
Except where otherwise noted, tracks composed by Hound Dog Taylor

1. "She's Gone" - 3:46
2. "Walking the Ceiling" - 3:12
3. "Held My Baby Last Night" (Elmore James) - 4:14
4. "Taylor's Rock" - 3:50
5. "It's Alright" - 3:10
6. "Phillips' Theme" - 5:27
7. "Wild About You, Baby" (Elmore James) - 3:35
8. "I Just Can't Make It" - 3:15
9. "It Hurts Me Too" (Elmore James) - 3:47
10. "44 Blues" - 2:52
11. "Give Me Back My Wig" - 3:31
12. "55th Street Boogie" - 2:59

== Personnel ==
Hound Dog Taylor and the HouseRockers

- Theodore Roosevelt "Hound Dog" Taylor – vocals, guitar
- Brewer Phillips – guitar
- Ted Harvey – drums

Production

- Peter Amft – design, photography
- Stu Black – engineer
- Bruce Iglauer – producer
- Wesley Race – producer, liner notes
- Michael Trossman – design
