= Lonesome Day Records =

- Founded: 2002
- Founder: Randall Deaton
- Distributor: CBUJ Entertainment
- Genre: Country, Americana, bluegrass
- Country of origin: U.S.
- Location: Booneville, Kentucky
- Official website: lonesomeday.com

Lonesome Day Records is an independent record label founded by Randall Deaton based in Booneville, Kentucky that supports bluegrass and country bands.

== History ==
Founder Randall Deaton started the Lonesome Day label in 2002, and released their first recordings in 2004. He named the label after the Bruce Springsteen song "Lonesome Day."

In 2013, Jeff Carter, a musician and co-founder of Via Media, purchased a minority shareholder stake in Lonesome Day, providing marketing experience and short term financing as required.

Also in 2013, Lonesome Day Records began a collaborative relationship with Rock House Entertainment, a company providing booking, publicity, media assistance, and management services for bluegrass bands.

In 2014, Lonesome Day Records launched a spinoff label, Dry Lightning Records that focused on Americana artists. Lonesome Day continued to release albums by its roster of bluegrass artists.

== Artists ==
Here is a partial list of artists who have released recordings on the Lonesome Day label.

- Rick Bartley
- Richard Bennett
- Blue Moon Rising
- The Boohers
- Sarah Borges
- Jeff Clair
- Larry Cordle and Lonesome Standard Time
- Fred Eaglesmith
- The Fabulous Ginn Sisters
- Ward Hayden and The Outliers (then known as Girls, Guns, and Glory) (2009–2015)
- Steve Gulley
- Randy Kohrs
- Julie Neumark
- Jeff Parker
- Lou Reid and Carolina
- Ralph Stanley II
- Ernie Thacker
- Darrell Webb
- Wildfire
- Sam Wilson

== See also ==
- List of record labels
