= Natural Boogie =

Studio album by Hound Dog Taylor and the HouseRockers
- Released: 1974
- Recorded: 1973
- Studio: Sound Studios, Chicago, Illinois
- Genre: Blues
- Length: 40:18
- Label: Alligator
- Producer: Bruce Iglauer

Hound Dog Taylor and the HouseRockers chronology
Hound Dog Taylor and the HouseRockers (1971)	Natural Boogie (1974)	Beware of the Dog (1975)

Professional ratings
Review scores
Source	Rating
AllMusic	4.4/5 stars
Christgau's Record Guide	A−
The Penguin Guide to Blues Recordings	3/4 stars

Natural Boogie is the second studio album released by Hound Dog Taylor and his band the HouseRockers. Released on Alligator Records (AL 4704) in 1974, it was the follow-up to their 1971 debut album Hound Dog Taylor and the HouseRockers.

== Background ==
Natural Boogie was recorded at Sound Studios in Chicago, and produced by Hound Dog Taylor and Bruce Iglauer. It was Taylor's second album, and the last to be released during his lifetime, although at the time of his death a live album, Beware of the Dog, was already planned.

== Reception ==
Cub Coda's review on AllMusic describes Natural Boogie as having a fatter sound than its predecessor, and a wider range of emotions and music. The website gives the album a rating of 4.5 stars out of 5. The Penguin Guide to Blues Recordings describes it as "a less incendiary performance than the first Alligator album but by no means lacking in bonhomie." In The Amazing Secret History of Elmore James, author Steve Franz writes that the album's balance of material makes it arguably Taylor's best album.

== Track listing ==
Except where otherwise noted, tracks composed by Hound Dog Taylor

1. "Take Five" – 2:40
2. "Hawaiian Boogie" (Elmore James, Joe Josea) – 2:38
3. "See Me in the Evening" – 5:04
4. "You Can't Sit Down" (Dee Clark, Phil Upchurch, Cornell Muldrow) – 3:20
5. "Sitting at Home Alone" – 4:07
6. "One More Time" (Brewer Phillips) – 2:27
7. "Roll Your Moneymaker" – 4:00
8. "Buster's Boogie" – 3:12
9. "Sadie" – 6:10
10. "Talk To My Baby" (Elmore James) – 3:18
11. "Goodnight Boogie" – 3:22

== Personnel ==
Hound Dog Taylor and the HouseRockers

- Theodore Roosevelt "Hound Dog" Taylor – vocals, guitar
- Brewer Phillips – guitar
- Ted Harvey – drums

=== Production ===
- Stu Black – engineer
- Tom Coyne – mastering
- Bruce Iglauer – producer
- Bob Keeling – photography
- Hound Dog Taylor – producer
- Michael Trossman – design
