= Mint Green (band) =

American emo-pop band

- Genres: Emo; pop; bubblegrunge
- Years active: 2015–present
- Labels: Pure Noise Records, 6131 Records
- Members: Ronnica; Daniel Huang; Tiffany Sammy
- Past members: Brandon Shaw; Brandon Geeslin; Frank Price; Nick Tyler Kelley; Muñeca Diaz

Mint Green is an American rock band from Boston, Massachusetts. The band is fronted by singer and guitarist Ronnica, with Daniel Huang on drums, and Tiffany Sammy on bass.

== History ==
Growing up, Ronnica listened to Lauryn Hill and Billie Holiday in her dad’s car out of his custom speakers from his home island of Anguilla. Her mother was a singer who enjoyed soft rock and found herself at odds with Ronnica and her brother, as they loved louder groups like Korn and Linkin Park. As a teenager, Ronnica played in various rock bands.

In 2015, right after Ronnica graduated high school, she made a Craigslist posting seeking a drummer for a new project, which is where she found Huang. Mint Green was the first band Ronnica played in where she was lead vocalist and front-woman. The band was named for Ronnica’s favorite color which she has described as, “not too loud, not too soft” like their music.

In November 2017, after just one EP release, the band was approached at a show by 6131 Records about a record deal. This caused two members of the band to drop out, realizing they weren’t prepared for this level of commitment to the project.

Mint Green released two independent self-funded EPs before being signed to Pure Noise Records and releasing their first full-length LP, All Girls Go to Heaven, in 2022.

In 2023, Mint Green played Boston Calling Music Festival's Sunday date on a lineup with Paramore, Queens of the Stone Age, and King Gizzard & the Lizard Wizard.

In 2025, the band headlined the Rat City Arts Festival with other local groups, including Tiberius, and Shallow Pools.

== Discography ==
Albums
Title	Year	Source
All Girls Go To Heaven	2022	

Extended plays
Title	Year	Source
Growth	2016	
Headspace	2018	

Singles
Title	Year	Source
“Take Care”	2017	
“Holy”	2018	
“Changing”	2020	
“Body Language”	2022	

Covers
Title	Year	Source
“Teenage Dream”	2020	
“Motion Sickness”	2020	
“Kyoto”	2020	
