= Powers Music School =

Coordinates: 42°23′43.1″N 71°10′28.6″W

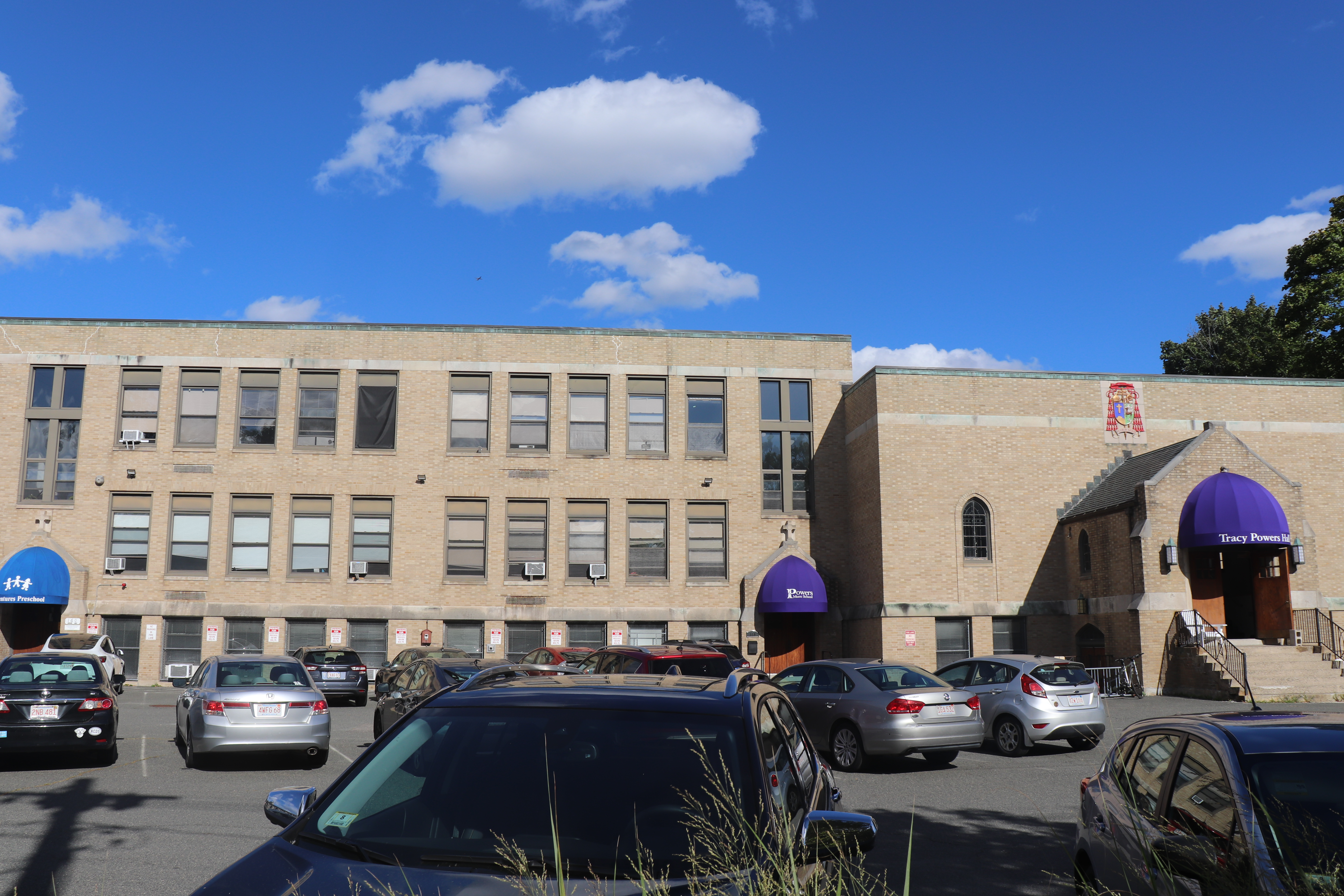
Powers Music School building exterior, 160 Lexington St., Belmont

Powers Music School is a musical institution in New England. Powers Music School is a community music center based in Belmont, Massachusetts. The School provides private music lessons, early childhood and group classes, ensembles, theory, music therapy, performance opportunities, workshops, and festivals. Music on the Hill (MOTH) offers jazz and classical training to advanced high school students, with an emphasis on chamber music, while Kids Crescendo provides a creative musical environment for younger kids.
