= The Ballroom Thieves =

American indie folk band

The Ballroom Thieves are an American indie folk band from Boston, Massachusetts.

== History ==
The band originated at Stonehill College in 2010. They released their first album in 2015, titled A Wolf in the Doorway. The band released their second full-length album, Deadeye, in 2016. In 2018, the band released an EP titled Paper Crown. In 2020, the Ballroom Thieves released their third full-length album titled Unlovely. Their fourth album, Clouds, was released in 2022.

== Discography ==
Studio albums

- A Wolf in the Doorway (2015, Blue Corn Music)
- Deadeye (2016, self-released)
- Unlovely (2020, Nettwerk)
- Clouds (2022, Nettwerk)
- Sundust (2024, Nettwerk)
