= Sooper Records =

American independent record label

- Founded: 2016
- Founder: Nnamdi; Sen Morimoto; Glenn Curran
- Distributor: Secretly Distribution
- Genre: Experimental
- Country of origin: United States
- Location: Chicago, Illinois
- Official website: www.sooperrecords.com

Sooper Records is an American independent record label based in Chicago, Illinois founded by artists Nnamdi, Sen Morimoto, and Glenn Curran.

== History ==
Curran and Ogbonnaya met as part of the same DIY and underground scene, as both were in bands that rehearsed in the same building. They met officially during a show at the now defunct Logan Square venue called Township and soon after they started to discuss forming a record label together. The label's releases are often genre-less and experimental.

Although Sooper primarily focuses on music releases, they often speak up for the Chicago community, as well as for national social justice causes.

== Artists ==
- Alicia Walter
- Anthony Fremont's Garden Solutions
- Blacker Face
- Blake Saint David
- Carlile
- Charles Joseph Smith
- Cisco Swank
- Dusty Patches
- Jodi
- Kaina
- Luke Titus
- Lynyn
- Marcus Drake
- Monobody
- NNAMDÏ
- Options
- Pile
- Rami Gabriel
- Sen Morimoto
- Sonny Falls
- This Is Lorelei
- Warm Human
- Woongi
