= Little Fuss =

Art pop indie band

- Origin: Boston
- Genres: Art pop
- Members: Olivia Martinez; Cody von Lehmden; Delia Martin; Vitor Oliveira
- Website: www.littlefussband.com

Little Fuss is an art pop indie band based in Boston, Massachusetts, United States. The band was founded by songwriters and producers Olivia Martinez and Cody Von Lehmden, and they have been joined by drummer Vitor Oliveira and bassist Delia Martin. They have released one album, Girls at Parties, which came out in January 2023. They have attracted positive attention, especially from critics in Boston, for carefully-crafted, psychologically-insightful music.
