= Francis of Delirium =

Luxembourgish musician

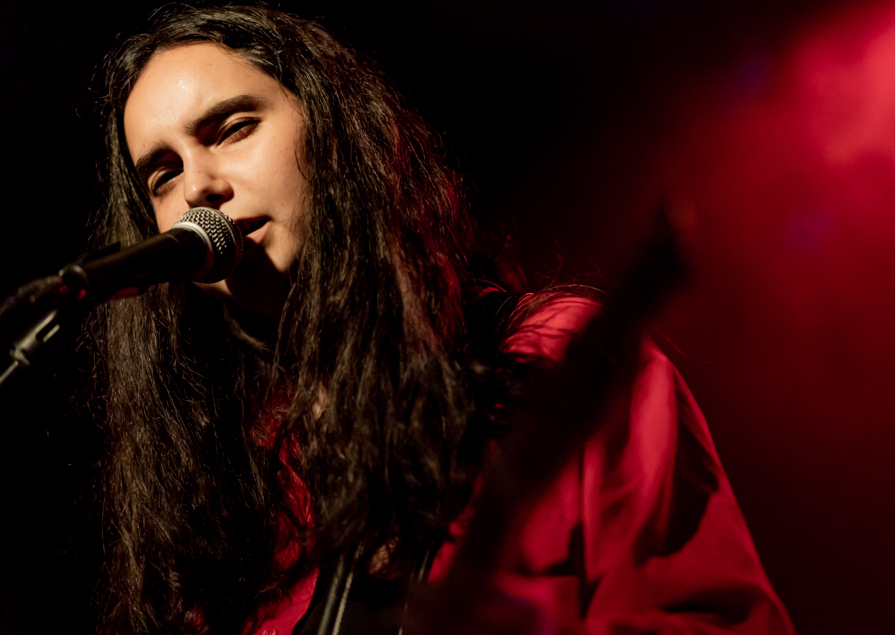
- Francis of Delirium in 2021

Background information
- Born: Jana Bahrich; 2001 or 2002 (age 24–25)
- Genre: Indie rock
- Occupation: Musician

Jana Bahrich (born 2001 or 2002), known professionally as Francis of Delirium, is a Luxembourgish indie rock musician. After playing French horn and banjo as a child, she went on to become a prominent musician in and beyond Luxembourg. She has toured with various bands and headlined her own tour in April 2024 for her debut album, Lighthouse, which was released in March 2024.

== Early life ==
Bahrich was born in 2001 or 2002. She grew up in Luxembourg, where she played French horn as a child and rented a banjo so she could learn to play "Foggy Mountain Breakdown". She was musically influenced by the instrumentation of Sufjan Stevens and the vocals and energy of Pearl Jam.

== Career ==
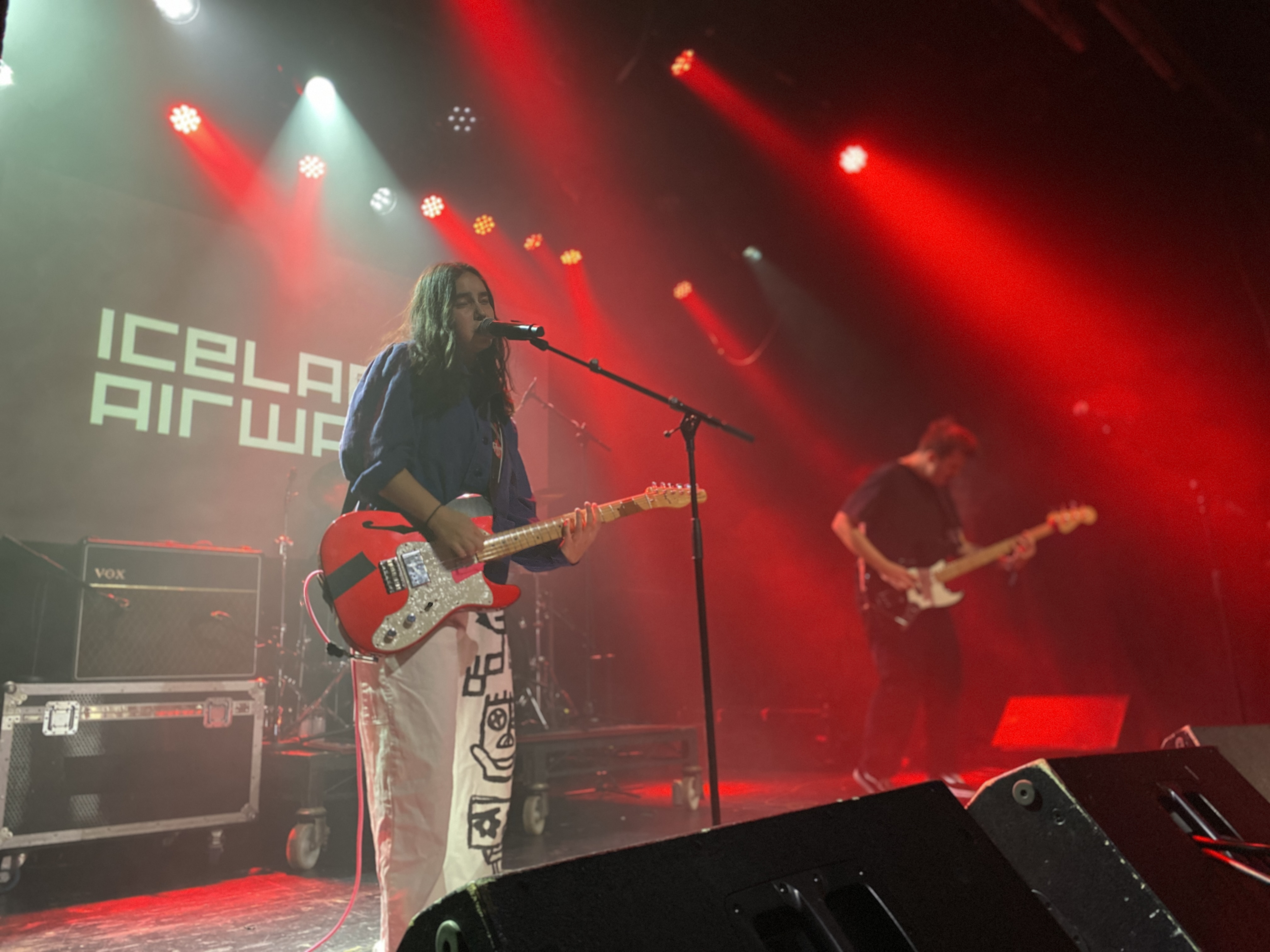
Francis of Delirium performing in Reykjavik in 2022

As Francis of Delirium, Bahrich works with producer Chris Hewett. Her indie rock music is characterized by its emotional stream-of-consciousness lyrics. Francis of Delirium has toured with The 1975, Soccer Mommy, Horsegirl, and Kings of Leon. She is a prominent artist in Luxembourg, where the alternative music scene has historically been relatively inactive, and frequently plays live shows in Europe.

=== Lighthouse ===
Francis of Delirium released her debut album, Lighthouse, on 22 March 2024 with Dalliance Recordings. Ahead of the album she released four singles: "Real Love", "First Touch", "Blue Tuesday", and the album's closing track "Give It Back to Me". Each of the singles for Lighthouse had its own cover art, each of which was a linocut print made by Bahrich.

Paste described the album as a whole as hopeful and bittersweet, characterizing it as a "thematically poignant" and "sonically captivating" coming-of-age album and comparing it to Melodrama by Lorde. DIY gave it four out of five stars and described it as a confident debut.

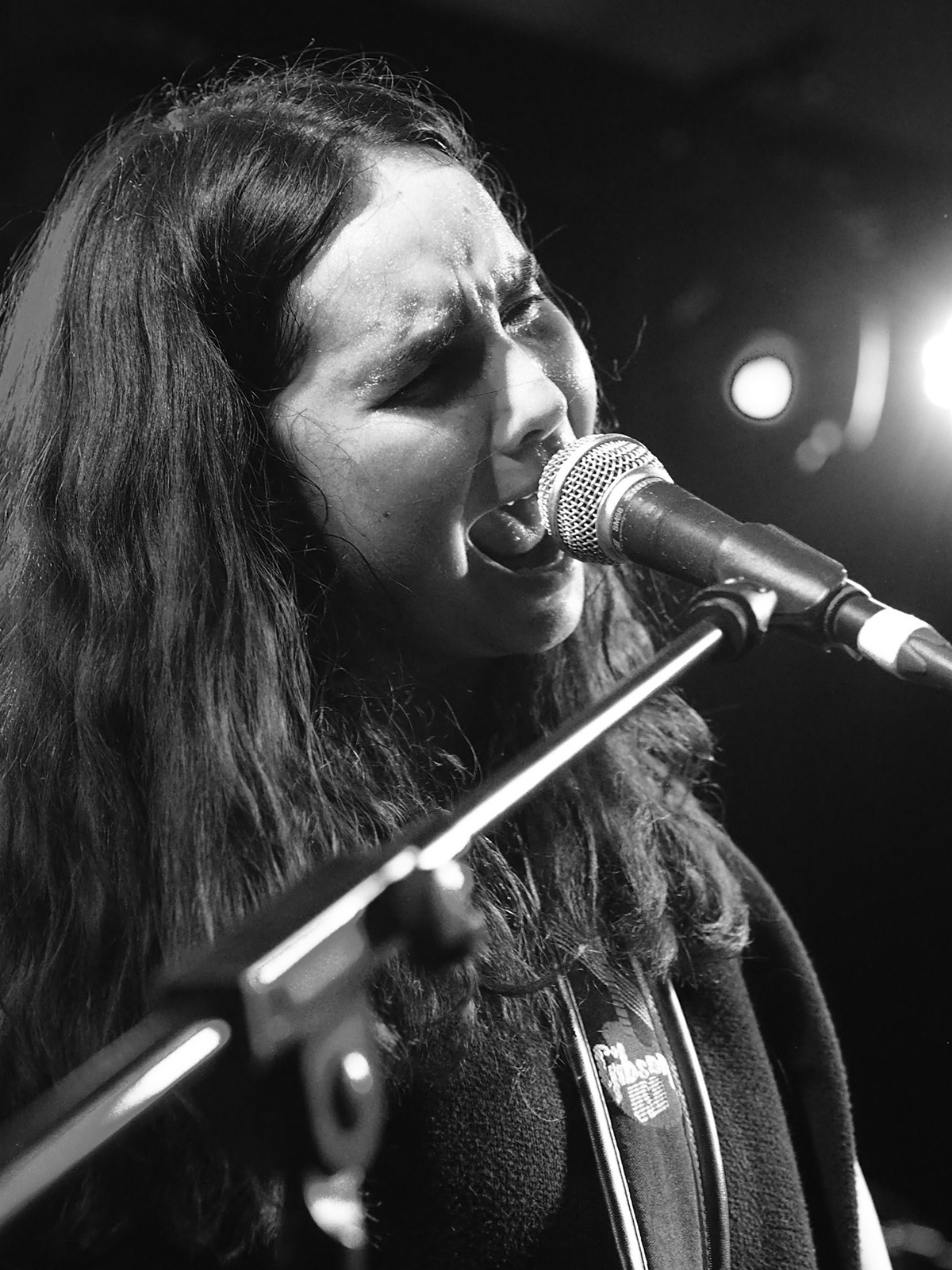
Francis of Delirium performing in London in 2022

The album's first track, "Ballet Dancers (Never Love Again)", was praised by Paste as an "effortless" song that gradually builds momentum, and "one of the best album intros of 2024 to date". DIY compared it to Weyes Blood. Catherine Marks, who has worked with boygenius, produced the tracks "Real Love" and "First Touch". The final song, "Give It Back to Me", was praised by DIY as an "almost cinematic" conclusion to the album that reflects "the level of musicality that's clearly demonstrated throughout".

=== Run, Run Pure Beauty ===
Their second album was released on May 29, 2026. Bahrich described the process of creating it as being more difficult and stressful than the first album.

- Braaten, Elizabeth (22 March 2024). "Francis of Delirium: 'Lighthouse' Album Review". Paste Magazine.
- Carter, Daisy (8 February 2024). "Get To Know… Francis of Delirium". DIY.
- DeVille, Chris (15 February 2024). "Francis Of Delirium Share New Single "Give It Back To Me": Listen". Stereogum.
- Grimwade, Charlotte (20 March 2024). "Francis of Delirium - Lighthouse". DIY.
