= Ric Wilson =

American rapper

- Origin: Chicago, Illinois, U.S.
- Genres: Hip-hop, funk, disco, house
- Occupation: Rapper
- Label: Free Disco

Ric Wilson is an American rapper and activist from Chicago. His music combines hip-hop with funk, disco, and house. His recordings include They Call Me Disco (2020), an EP with producer Terrace Martin, and Clusterfunk (2023), a collaboration with Chromeo and A-Trak.

== Early career and activism ==
Wilson took part in Young Chicago Authors and gave some of his first performances at Lyricists Loft, a weekly open mic at the Harold Washington Library. He attended the Chicago Freedom School, which later hired him as a youth coordinator. In 2014, he was one of eight delegates from the Chicago activist group We Charge Genocide who presented to the United Nations Committee Against Torture in Geneva about police violence in Chicago.

== Music career ==
Wilson released the mixtape Penny Raps and the EP The Sun Was Out in 2015, followed by Soul Bounce in 2016. His 2017 EP Negrow Disco paid tribute to early disco and its queer pioneers of color. In 2018, he released BANBA. Its first single, "Split", featured Sen Morimoto.

At the 2019 Pitchfork Music Festival, Wilson performed "Trunk Music" with the Lane Tech College Prep High School marching band. He founded the label Free Disco near the end of the 2010s and released the six-track They Call Me Disco with Terrace Martin in 2020. The following year, he released the collaborative EP Disco Ric in London Town with British musician Yellow Days. In 2022, Time included "Coco Badass", featuring Kiéla Adira, in its summer music roundup.

Wilson began working with A-Trak and Chromeo in Los Angeles in 2020. The sessions led to Clusterfunk, which was released in 2023. Wilson returned to the Pitchfork Music Festival that year, performing material from the project with a live band and Adira on vocals. WBEZ included Clusterfunk in its year-end selection of Chicago albums.

In 2024, Wilson toured with acts including Black Pumas and Chromeo. In 2025, he released the solo EP America Runs on Disco. Its lead single, "Missin My Window", was a collaboration with Party Pupils.

== Selected discography ==
- The Sun Was Out (2015)
- Soul Bounce (2016)
- Negrow Disco (2017)
- BANBA (2018)
- They Call Me Disco (with Terrace Martin, 2020)
- Disco Ric in London Town (with Yellow Days, 2021)
- Clusterfunk (with Chromeo and A-Trak, 2023)
- America Runs on Disco (2025)
