= Pile (band) =

American indie rock band

- Origin: Boston, Massachusetts, United States
- Genres: Indie rock; post-punk; post-hardcore; slowcore; noise rock
- Years active: 2007–present
- Labels: Sooper Records; Exploding in Sound; Fierce Panda
- Members: Rick Maguire; Alex Molini; Kris Kuss; Matt Connery
- Website: pilemusic.com

Pile is an American indie rock band from Boston, Massachusetts. Starting as the solo act of Rick Maguire in the late 2000s, Pile has been a collective since the release of Magic Isn't Real in 2010. To date, Pile has released nine full-length albums. In recent years the band has gained increasing popularity, becoming a prominent part of the Boston indie rock scene and frequently touring through both the US and Europe. While remaining outside of the mainstream, the band has been repeatedly recognized for captivating a particularly enthusiastic and dedicated fan base. Their sound has been described by The Village Voice as a "distinct blend of melted guitars" with "howling-wolf vocals and shred-free guitar harmonies".

== History ==
Pile released its first album Demonstration on July 7, 2007. In 2009, a second album called Jerk Routine was released. In 2010 Pile formed its current line-up as a band and released the album Magic Isn't Real. The band released a 7-inch single called "Big Web" in 2011. After self-releasing three albums and one single, Pile signed with record label Exploding in Sound in October 2011, and released the first album under this label, Dripping, on October 23, 2012. The band released a new single, "Special Snowflakes", on March 11, 2014. They continued to release a fifth album, their second under Exploding in Sound, called You're Better Than This on March 3, 2015. Later that year, Pile released First Other Tape on August 4, 2015.

On March 31, 2017, they released their sixth album, A Hairshirt of Purpose. On April 25, 2018, Pile released the single "Keep the Last Light On", which had previously been released as part of the Boston Sessions, Vol. 1: Beast compilation. It was featured on the compilation album Odds and Ends, which collated a series of b-sides, compilation tracks and the like from across Pile's career.

On August 28, 2018, Maguire announced, in an email to Pile's fans, that guitarist Matt Becker had stepped out of the band indefinitely and bass player Matt Connery had stepped out temporarily. Chappy Hull and Alex Molini would be playing guitar and bass on the next album and tour. It was later revealed that Maguire had moved from Boston, and was now living in a house with Hull and Molini in Nashville. On May 3, 2019, Pile released their seventh LP, Green and Gray.

On October 2, 2020, Pile released Second Other Tape, a new collection of "ideas, experiments, and songs that are only partially formed." Recorded between March and August, 2020, this release was exclusively available on cassette through the group's Bandcamp. 2015's First Other Tape was also made available for purchase, and the two tapes were available through December 4, 2020. To celebrate 10 years since the release of Magic Isn't Real, on April 17, 2021, Pile performed the album in its entirety during a video live stream on their Bandcamp account, using its lineup from 2011 – 2017 (Rick Maguire, Matt Becker, Matt Connery, and Kris Kuss). The band then released In the Corners of a Sphere-Filled Room on May 7, 2021. Unlike previous releases, this album is fully improvisational, with 14 tracks of collected noise recorded intermittently between December 2018 and January 2021 – primarily during Green and Gray's session.

On February 17, 2023, Pile released All Fiction, their eighth full-length album, recorded at Marcata Recording. On January 5, 2024, they released the Hot Air Balloon EP, which consisted of material recorded during the All Fiction sessions.

On November 18, 2024, Pile signed to Sooper Records, and released their ninth studio album, Sunshine and Balance Beams, on the label on August 15, 2025.

== Members ==
Current

- Rick Maguire – vocals, guitar (2007–present)
- Alex Molini – bass (2018–present)
- Kris Kuss – drums (2009–present)
- Matt Connery – bass (2010–2018), touring member (2022), guitar (2023–present)

Former

- Chappy Hull – guitar (2018–2021)
- Matt Becker – guitar (2008–2018), touring member (2022)

Touring

- Eric Schermerhorn – guitar
- Steve Hartlett – guitar (2013)
- Yazan Fahmawi – guitar (2015)
- Shahjehan Khan - guitar (2025)

== Discography ==
Studio albums

- Demonstration (2007, self-released)
- Jerk Routine (2009, self-released, reissued on Exploding in Sound)
- Magic Isn't Real (2010, self-released)
- Dripping (2012, Exploding in Sound)
- You're Better Than This (2015, Exploding in Sound)
- A Hairshirt of Purpose (2017, Exploding in Sound)
- Green and Gray (2019, Exploding in Sound)
- All Fiction (2023, Exploding in Sound)
- Sunshine and Balance Beams (2025, Sooper Records)

Singles

- "Big Web" (2011, self-released, 7-inch)
- "Special Snowflakes" / "Mama's Lipstick" (2014, Exploding in Sound)

Other releases

- First Other Tape (2015, self-released, cassette)
- Pile – Audiotree Live (2017, Audiotree)
- Live at Third Man Records (2017, Third Man Records)
- Odds and Ends (2018, Exploding in Sound)
- Glow (2020, demos from Magic Isn't Real sessions, self-released)
- Second Other Tape (2020, self-released, cassette)
- In the Corners of a Sphere-Filled Room (2021, self-released)
- Songs Known Together, Alone (2021, Exploding in Sound)
- Hot Air Balloon EP (2024, Exploding in Sound)
