= Hound Dog Taylor =

American blues guitarist and singer (1917–1975)

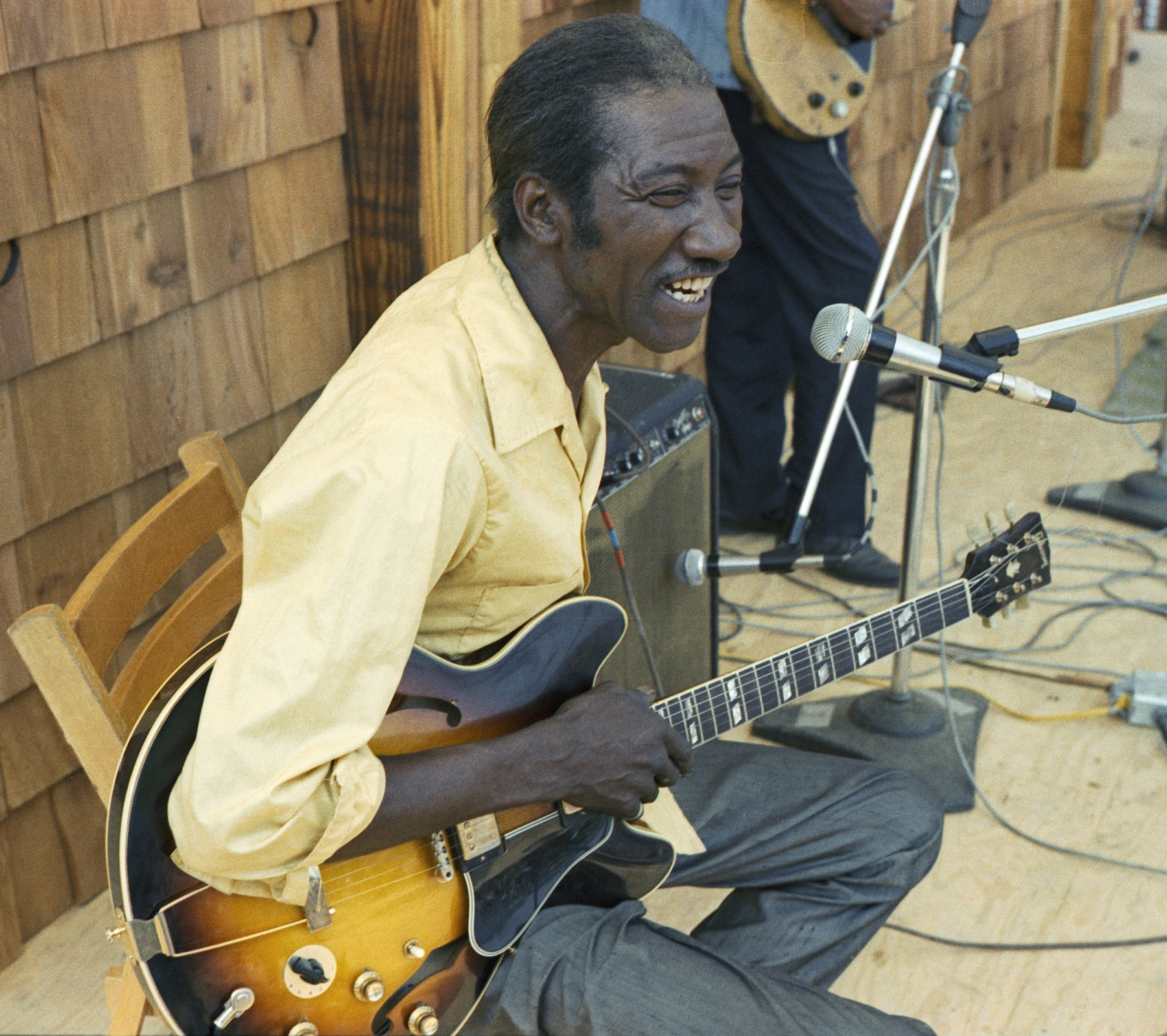
- Hound Dog Taylor at the 1970 Ann Arbor Blues Festival

Background information
- Born: Theodore Roosevelt Taylor; April 12, 1917; Natchez, Mississippi, U.S.
- Died: December 17, 1975 (aged 58) Chicago, Illinois, U.S.
- Genres: Chicago blues; blues rock; rock and roll
- Occupations: Musician; songwriter
- Instruments: Vocals; guitar
- Years active: 1930s–1975
- Label: Alligator

Theodore Roosevelt "Hound Dog" Taylor (April 12, 1917 – December 17, 1975) was an American Chicago blues guitarist and singer.

== Life and career ==
Taylor was born in Natchez, Mississippi in 1917, though some sources say 1915 or 1916. He first played the piano and began playing the guitar at 20. He moved to Chicago in 1942.

Taylor had a condition known as polydactyly, which resulted in him having six fingers on both hands. As is usual with the condition, the extra digits were rudimentary nubbins and could not be moved. One night, while drunk, he cut off the extra digit on his right hand using a straight razor.

He became a full-time musician around 1957, but remained unknown outside the Chicago area, where he played small clubs in black neighborhoods and at the open-air Maxwell Street Market. He was known for his electrified slide guitar playing (roughly styled after that of Elmore James), his cheap Japanese Teisco guitars, and his boogie beats. In 1967, Taylor toured Europe with the American Folk Blues Festival, performing with Little Walter and Koko Taylor.

"Taylor is a spiritual and cultural miracle. Only John Lee Hooker is as unselfconsciously inelegant, and Hooker doesn't have Brewer Phillips's bass and Ted Harvey's drums to turn his blues into rock and roll."

— Christgau's Record Guide: Rock Albums of the Seventies (1981)

Bruce Iglauer (then a shipping clerk for Delmark Records) tried to persuade his employer to sign Taylor to a recording contract after he heard Taylor with his band, the HouseRockers (Brewer Phillips on second guitar and Ted Harvey on drums), in 1970 at Florence's Lounge on Chicago's South Side. In 1971, having no success in getting Delmark to sign Taylor, Iglauer used a $2,500 inheritance to form Alligator Records, which recorded Taylor's debut album, Hound Dog Taylor and the HouseRockers. The album was recorded in just two nights. It was the first release for Alligator, which eventually became a major blues label. Iglauer began managing and booking the band, which toured nationwide and performed with Muddy Waters, Freddie King, and Big Mama Thornton. The band became especially popular in the Boston area, where Taylor inspired the young George Thorogood. The album Live at Joe's Place documents a 1972 performance in Boston. The second release by Taylor and his band, Natural Boogie, recorded in late 1973, received greater acclaim and led to more touring. In 1975, they toured Australia and New Zealand with Freddie King and the duo of Sonny Terry and Brownie McGhee, before Taylor died of lung cancer in December of that year. Alligator has released several records of Taylor's posthumously: a live album entitled Beware of the Dog which was recorded in 1974, as well as the studio recordings Genuine Houserocking Music and Release the Hound. Bootleg live recordings also circulated after Taylor's death.

== Awards and recognition ==
In 1984, Taylor was posthumously inducted into the Blues Hall of Fame. His induction statement included: "He was not a virtuoso, nor a master technician. But the few things he could play, he could play like no one else could. He told writer Bob Neff the way he would like to be remembered: 'He couldn’t play shit, but he sure made it sound good.'"

In 1997, Alligator Records released Hound Dog Taylor: A Tribute, a 14-track tribute album in which Taylor's songs are covered by Luther Allison, Elvin Bishop, Cub Koda (with the HouseRockers), Gov't Mule, Sonny Landreth, and others. A "Deluxe Edition" series compilation album followed in 1999.

A live recording by George Thorogood of Elmore James' "The Sky Is Crying" is dedicated to "the memory of the late great Hound Dog Taylor". It is included on his album Live (1986); Thorogood also recorded Taylor's "Just Can't Make It" for his album More George Thorogood and the Destroyers (1980), "She's Gone" for his album Ride 'Til I Die (2003), and "Give Me Back My Wig" for his album The Hard Stuff (2006).

== Discography ==
- Hound Dog Taylor and the HouseRockers (Alligator, 1971)
- Natural Boogie (Alligator, 1974)
- Beware of the Dog! [live] (Alligator, 1976)
- Live at Florences (JSP Records, 1981)
- Genuine Houserocking Music (Alligator, 1982)
- Live at Joe's Place (Fan Club [Fr] Records, 1992)
- Hound Dog Taylor: Deluxe Edition [compilation] (Alligator, 1999)
- Release the Hound (Alligator, 2004)
