= Sarah Borges =

American singer-songwriter

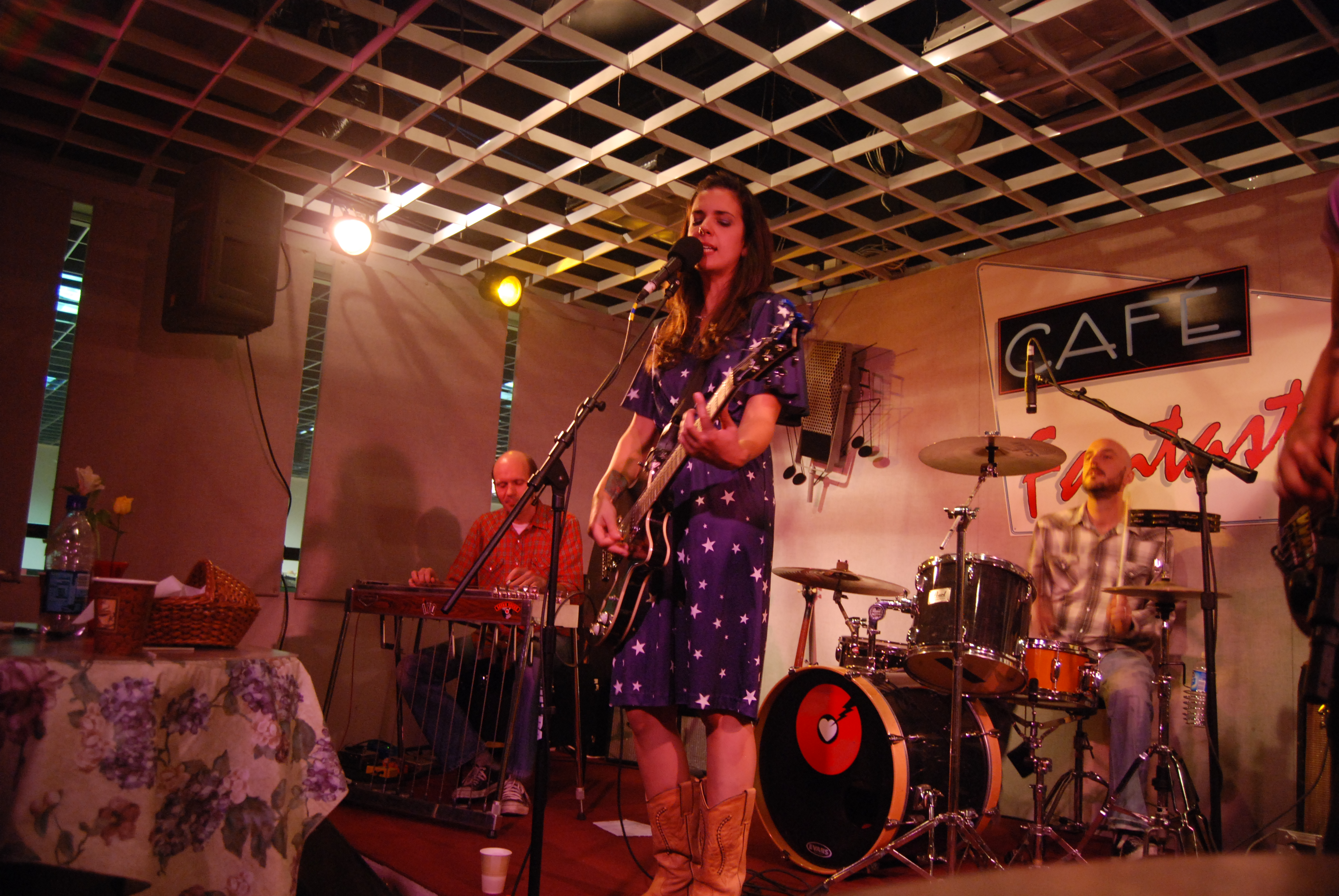
- Sarah Borges and the Broken Singles at Cafe Fantastique in Worcester, Massachusetts, 2007

Background information
- Origin: Taunton, Massachusetts, United States
- Genres: Alternative Country
- Years active: 2004–Present
- Labels: Sugar Hill Records, Lonesome Day Records
- Website: sarahborges.com

Sarah Borges is a rock and roll musician based in the Boston area. She was signed to Sugar Hill Records. Her music has been described as "walking that fine line between punk and country". Her wide variety of influences are often noted. They range from Dolly Parton, Mahalia Jackson, X, Sid Vicious, and Merle Haggard to bubblegum pop. Borges grew up in Taunton, Massachusetts south of Boston, in the third generation of a Portuguese (hence the hard "g" in her name) family. She was interested in musical theater as a youth and majored in it while a student at Emerson College in downtown Boston. Borges was married to guitarist Lyle Brewer, who is from the Boston area. Circa 2010-2013, Borges gave birth to a son.

Borges has long called her band The Broken Singles, with the only other constant member being Binky, the bassist and her longtime friend. Over the years, various lead guitarists and drummers have performed with the band.

On the strength of a performance at the South by Southwest Festival in 2004, Borges earned a record deal with Houston's Blue Corn Records. Her first record, 2005's Silver City earned praise for showcasing "an unusual knack for mixing alternative rock with country". Allmusic compared Borges to Maria McKee of Lone Justice, and admired how her songs "balance some fierce guitar licks with heartfelt twang". After extensive touring nationally and opening for noted acts including Dave Alvin, Sarah Borges and The Broken Singles were signed by Sugar Hill Records. The title of her 2007 release Diamonds in the Dark is a line from the song Come Back to Me, by one of her favorite bands, X. The album features a cover of the song and many original songs in addition to Tom Waits and Greg Cartwright covers. Allmusic commended the album saying it is "grittily brilliant" with songs that are "brilliantly rollicking".

A third album, The Stars Are Out was released in March 2009. Borges commented that the album features more of a straightforward rock 'n roll sound than her earlier work. The album has five covers of artists ranging from Smokey Robinson to The Lemonheads. Allmusic describes the album as being "material grounded in Americana even as it morphs from folk to rock and even soul" and calls it a "short but sweet collection". After its release, Borges and the Broken Singles received a nomination for Best Emerging Artist at the Americana Music Association festival in Nashville.

Borges released Radio Sweetheart in 2014 on Lonesome Day Records, which was recorded at Napoleon Complex in Somerville, Massachusetts and Woolly Mammoth Sound in Waltham, Massachusetts. Borges released a follow-up EP in 2016, Good & Dirty, which was produced by Eric "Roscoe" Ambel. Sarah Borges and the Broken Singles released Love's Middle Name in 2018 and they went on tour in 2021.

== Discography ==
Year	Title	Artist	Label
2005	Silver City	Sarah Borges	Blue Corn Music
2007	Diamonds in the Dark	Sarah Borges and the Broken Singles	Sugar Hill Records
2009	The Stars Are Out	Sarah Borges and the Broken Singles	Sugar Hill Records
2010	Live Singles	Sarah Borges	-
2013	Radio Sweetheart	Sarah Borges	Modern Trick
2016	Good and Dirty (EP)	Sarah Borges	Dry Lightning Records
2018	Love's Middle Name	Sarah Borges and the Broken Singles	Blue Corn Music
2022	Together Alone	Sarah Borges	Blue Corn Music
