= Brewer Phillips =

American blues guitarist (1924–1999)

Brewer Phillips (November 16, 1924 – August 30, 1999) was an American blues guitarist, chiefly associated with juke joint blues and Chicago blues.

Phillips was born on a plantation in Coila, Mississippi, and learned the blues from Memphis Minnie at an early age. He relocated to Memphis, Tennessee, and recorded with Bill Harvey, Roosevelt Sykes, later moving to Chicago where he played with Hound Dog Taylor. Following Taylor's death in 1975, Phillips recorded under his own name and also performed with J. B. Hutto, Lil' Ed Williams, and Cub Koda, among others, playing both acoustic and electric guitar. He recorded for Delmark Records and JSP Records.

Phillips died of natural causes in Chicago in August 1999, at the age of 74.

== Discography ==
- Whole Lotta Blues (JSP Records)
- Homebrew (Delmark Records, 1996)
- Well Alright (Black Rose, 2008)
