= Sen Morimoto =

Japanese musician

Sen Morimoto is a Japanese jazz rap multi-instrumentalist. Born in Kyoto, Morimoto is from western Massachusetts, and currently lives in Chicago. Morimoto has released three albums. Their first album, Cannonball! was released in 2018. Morimoto released their self-titled second album in 2021. Their third album, Diagnosis, was released in 2023.

In addition to releasing their own music, Morimoto has collaborated with Kaina, Nnamdi Ogbonnaya, and Lala Lala.

== Early life ==
Morimoto was born in Kyoto and grew up in Massachusetts, where they began playing the saxophone at age ten. They studied jazz, took up hip-hop, and played in punk bands before establishing themselves as a musician in Chicago.

== Career ==
Morimoto's debut album, Cannonball!, appeared in 2018 through Sooper Records and 88rising. It combined saxophone and rap and featured the Chicago singer KAINA. Their self-titled second album followed in 2020 on Sooper Records. Around this period, Morimoto also played on recordings by the jazz ensemble Resavoir, rapper Ric Wilson, and indie rock act Lala Lala.

For their third album, Diagnosis (2023), Morimoto worked with City Slang in partnership with Sooper Records. The album explores the pressures of working in the music industry and features vocals by KAINA and NNAMDÏ. In April 2024, Morimoto released BONK!, an EP that includes songs written during the Diagnosis sessions and a live recording of the album's title track from WXPN.

Morimoto's fourth studio album, Time Is on Your Side, came out on Sooper Records in October 2026. The album features Kaina Castillo, Ryan Person, Elijah Bradford, and Brok Mende.

== Discography ==
=== Studio albums ===
- Cannonball! (2018)
- Sen Morimoto (2020)
- Diagnosis (2023)
- Time Is on Your Side (2026)
