= Kaina (singer) =

American singer

- Born: Kaina Castillo; January 22, 1996 (age 30); Chicago, Illinois, U.S.
- Occupations: Singer; songwriter
- Years active: 2016–present
- Musical career
- Genres: R&B; Latin; pop; soul
- Instrument: Vocals
- Label: City Slang
- Website: kaina.live

Kaina Castillo (born January 22, 1996), known simply as, KAINA (stylized in all caps), is an American singer-songwriter. On July 12, 2019, she released her debut album, Next to the Sun. In 2022, she released her second studio album, It Was a Home.

== Early life ==
Castillo was born and raised in Chicago, Illinois, to a Venezuelan mother and Guatemalan father. She started discovering music at the age of nine, such as Stevie Wonder, Celia Cruz, and Oscar D'León. She also performed with The Happiness Club, a nonprofit that offers diverse youth a space to explore music, dance, and visual arts.

She studied public relations and advertising at DePaul University for two years.

== Career ==
=== 2019–2020: Next to the Sun ===
In early 2019, she released the single "Green". The music video gives a glimpse into her life in Chicago, with a visual of a family dinner.

On July 12, 2019, Castillo released her debut album, Next to the Sun, through Sooper Records.

=== 2021–present: It Was a Home ===
On August 9, 2021, Castillo released a cover of "Come Back as a Flower" by Stevie Wonder, accompanied by a music video. This cover served as the first single of Castillo's second studio album. A second single was released, "Casita", on November 2, 2021. The third single, "Anybody Can Be in Love", was released with the announcement of her second studio album. On January 9, 2022, "Apple" was released as the fourth single.

On March 4, 2022, It Was a Home was released through City Slang. The second album includes collaborations with Sen Morimoto, Sleater-Kinney, and Helado Negro. Two days after the release of the album, the single "Golden Mirror" was released. The It Was a Home Tour commenced on March 16 and concluded on July 17.

== Discography ==
Kaina discography
- Studio albums: 2
- EPs: 2
- Live albums: 1
- Singles: 6

=== Studio albums ===
Title	Details	Ref.
Next to the Sun	Released: July 12, 2019; Label: Sooper; Format: Vinyl, Compact disc, streaming, digital download	
It Was a Home	Released: March 4, 2022; Label: City Slang; Format: Vinyl, CD, streaming, digital download	

=== Extended plays ===
Title	Details	Ref.
Sweet Asl.	Released: August 9, 2016; Label: Self-released; Format: Streaming, digital download	
4U	Released: March 16, 2018; Label: Self-released; Format: Streaming, digital download	

=== Live albums ===
Title	Details	Ref.
KAINA on Audiotree Live	Released: October 2, 2019; Label: Audiotree Music; Format: Streaming, digital download	

=== Singles ===
Title	Year	Album
"Love in a Crowd" (ft. Sen Morimoto)	2017	—N/a
"F*cked Up"	2018	—N/a
"Green"	2018	Sweet Asl.
"Come Back as a Flower"	2021	It Was a Home
"Casita"	2021	It Was a Home
"Anybody Can Be in Love"	2021	It Was a Home
"Apple"	2022	It Was a Home
"Golden Mirror"	2022	It Was a Home

=== Music videos ===
Title	Year	Album	Director(s)
"Happy"	2018	4U	Dennis Larance
"Green"	2019	Next to the Sun	Jean Deaux
"Come Back as a Flower"	2021	It Was a Home	Carolina Aguirre
"Anybody Can Be in Love"	2021	It Was a Home	Weird Life Films
"Apple"	2022	It Was a Home	Weird Life Films
"Golden Mirror"	2022	It Was a Home	Weird Life Films
