= Nnamdï =

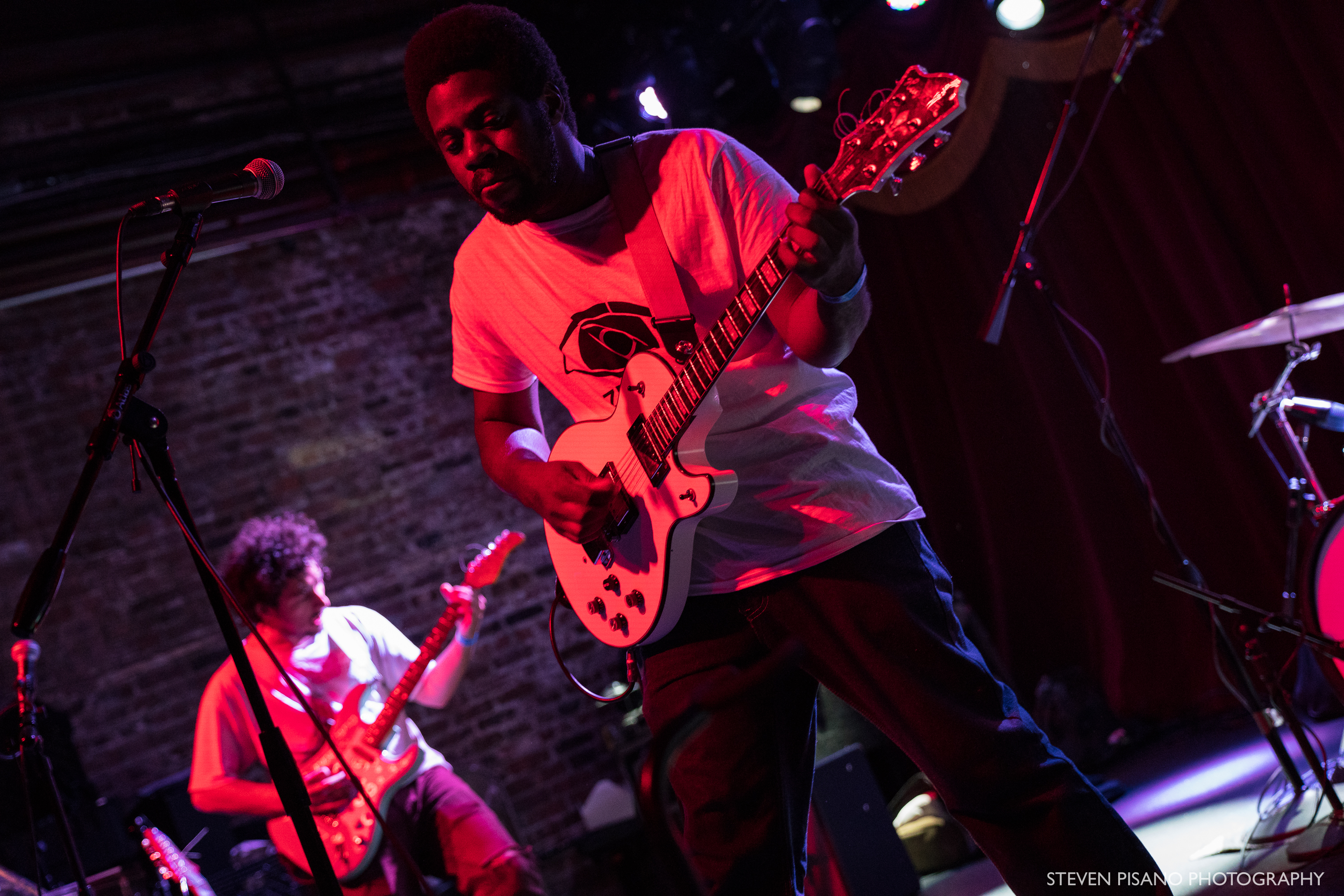

Background information
- Also known as: Nnamdï; Nnamdi's Sooper-Dooper Secret Side Project; NSDSSP
- Born: California, U.S.
- Origin: Chicago, Illinois, U.S.
- Genres: Avant-pop
- Occupation: Multi-instrumentalist, singer-songwriter
- Years active: 2009–present
- Labels: Father/Daughter Records; Secretly Canadian; Sooper Records; Swerp Records
- Website: nnamdi.bandcamp.com www.nnamdi.live

Nnamdi Ogbonnaya, known as Nnamdï (stylized as NNAMDÏ), is an American multi-instrumentalist and singer-songwriter. He is based in Chicago, Illinois. He is a founder of the record label Sooper Records.

Born in California to Nigerian immigrants, Ogbonnaya first moved to Ohio. He spent most of his childhood in Lansing, Illinois. He earned an electrical engineering degree at the University of Illinois at Chicago.

He released Bootie Noir in 2013, Feckin Weirdo in 2014, Drool in 2017, Brat in 2020, and Please Have a Seat in 2022.

== Discography ==
=== Studio albums ===
- Bootie Noir (2013)
- Feckin Weirdo (2014)
- Drool (2017)
- Brat (2020)
- Krazy Karl (2020)
- Please Have a Seat (2022)

=== EPs ===
- Despondent (2013)

=== Singles ===
- "You Like" (2017)
- "Love to See" (2018)
- "Price Went Up" (2019)
