= 2016 in American music =

The following is a list of events and releases that happened in 2016 in music in the United States.

== Notable events ==
=== January ===
- 8 – David Bowie released his final album, Blackstar, just two days before his death. It was his first album to debut at number one on the Billboard 200.
- 11 – Ciara performed the National Anthem at the second College Football Playoff Championship.
- 15 – Panic! at the Disco released their fifth studio album, Death of a Bachelor. It is their first album to be entirely written and recorded by Brendon Urie, the last remaining member of the band. It is also their first album to debut at number one on the Billboard 200.
- 28 – Rihanna released her eighth studio album Anti; two days following its release the album was certified platinum by the Recording Industry Association of America (RIAA) after receiving 1 million free downloads in 15 hours due to a deal with Samsung, becoming the fastest certified platinum album in history.

=== February ===
- 7 – During Super Bowl 50 in Santa Clara, California, Lady Gaga performed "The Star-Spangled Banner" and British band Coldplay performed at halftime with artists Beyoncé, Bruno Mars and Mark Ronson.
- 14 – Kanye West released his 7th studio album The Life of Pablo, he also unveiled Yeezy Season 3 in a listening experience at Madison Square Garden.
- 15 – The 58th Annual Grammy Awards, hosted by LL Cool J, took place at the Staples Center in Los Angeles. Kendrick Lamar won the most awards of the night with five. Taylor Swift won Album of the Year for the second time with 1989, becoming the first woman to do so; her previous win was for Fearless in 2010.
- 26 – Anthrax released their first studio album in five years, For All Kings.

=== March ===
- 4 – Ninja Sex Party released their first cover album, and album with Tupper Ware Remix Party as their backing band.
- 5 – Rihanna's single "Work" became the first dancehall song to top the Billboard Hot 100 since Sean Paul's "Temperature" in 2006. It is also her 14th number-one hit, surpassing Michael Jackson, for having the third-most number-one songs of the Hot 100, behind Mariah Carey and The Beatles.
- 11 – 3 Doors Down released their first studio album in five years, Us and the Night.
- 18 – Gwen Stefani released her first solo studio album in ten years, This Is What the Truth Feels Like. The album became her first number one on the Billboard 200.
- 19 – I, the Breather played their last concert in Allentown, Pennsylvania.
  - At the Drive-In's guitarist and co-founder, Jim Ward, leaves the band shortly before their 2016 reunion tour.
- 25 – Zayn Malik, released his first solo studio album, Mind of Mine, and becomes the British male artist to debut at No. 1 on the Billboard 200.
- 30 – R&B singer-songwriter Brandy filed a lawsuit against her label, Chameleon Entertainment Group, for allegedly blocking her from recording and releasing new music.

=== April ===
- 1 – Cheap Trick released their first album in seven years, Bang, Zoom, Crazy... Hello.
  - Guns N' Roses performed a concert at the Troubadour, marking the first time Axl Rose performed with classic era band members Slash and Duff McKagan in twenty-three years.
- 3 – The 51st Annual ACM Awards took place in Las Vegas. Chris Stapleton was the big winner of the night and Jason Aldean won the biggest award of the night, Entertainer of the Year. Luke Bryan and Dierks Bentley were hosts.
  - The 3rd iHeartRadio Music Awards took place in Inglewood, California. Taylor Swift was the big winner of the night.
- 7 – Trent Harmon won the fifteenth season of American Idol. This was the show's last season, but was picked up by ABC the following year. La'Porsha Renae is runner-up. All fourteen previous winners, and several Idol alumni took part of the two-hour finale.
- 21 – Seven time Grammy Award winner Prince dies at his recording studio in Minnesota at the age of 57.
- 23 – Beyoncé premiered her sixth studio album Lemonade on HBO with an hour-long film. The album was released on Tidal, where it remained exclusively available to stream for 24 hours, until it was uploaded to all formats, including iTunes. Upon the album debuting at number-one on the Billboard 200 chart, Beyoncé became the first act in Billboard history to have their first six albums debut at number one.
- 29 – Drake releases his first studio album in three years, Views. The album spends longest time atop the Billboard 200 for a rapper, since To the Extreme by Vanilla Ice in 1990, spending 12 weeks at number-one.

=== May ===
- 13 – Chance the Rapper, released his streaming-only album, Coloring Book, and becomes the first album to chart on the Billboard 200, without selling any copies.
- 20 – Saosin released Along the Shadow, their first studio album since 2009, and also their first full-length album with original lead vocalist Anthony Green (who originally left the band before they released their 2006 debut). It is also their first album without lead guitarist Justin Shekoski.
- 22 – The 2016 Billboard Music Awards took place in Las Vegas. Britney Spears won the Millennium Award, Céline Dion won the Icon Award and Rihanna won Chart Achievement Award.
- 24 – Alisan Porter won the tenth season of The Voice. Adam Wakefield was named runner-up. Hannah Huston and Laith Al-Saadi finishing third and fourth place respectively. Christina Aguilera becomes the first female winning coach in The Voice history.
- 27 – Thrice released their first studio album in five years after returning from hiatus.

=== June ===
- 1 – The Dixie Chicks played their first headlining U.S. tour in ten years on the DCX MMXVI World Tour.
- 3 – Whitford/St. Holmes, the duo of Brad Whitford and Derek St. Holmes, released their first studio album in 25 years, Reunion.
- 10 – Former The Voice contestant Christina Grimmie, age 22, was shot following a concert in Orlando, Florida; she died from her injuries.
- 17 – Red Hot Chili Peppers released their first studio album in five years, The Getaway.

=== July ===
- 1 – Blink-182 released California, their first album to feature Alkaline Trio frontman Matt Skiba as a full-time member, and also their first album without founding member Tom DeLonge. It was also their first studio album in five years.
- 15 – Good Charlotte released their first studio album in six years, Youth Authority.
- 22 – Tonic released their first studio album in six years, Lemon Parade Revisited.
- 29 – The Descendents released Hypercaffium Spazzinate, their first studio album in 12 years.

=== August ===
- 6 – Sia became the first female artist over 40 years old to have a number one song, with "Cheap Thrills", since Madonna in 2000.
- 20 – Frank Ocean released his first studio album in four years, Blonde.
- 26 – Britney Spears released her first album in three years, Glory.
  - Céline Dion released her first French-language studio album in four years, Encore Un Soir and became one of the biggest-selling records of the year. The album was also a tribute to her husband, who died 7 months earlier.
  - Fear Factory perform live at Reload Festival in Sulingen, Germany. The performance marks the band's last live appearance for seven years and their final performance with original vocalist Burton C. Bell before his departure four years later.
- 28 – The 2016 MTV Video Music Awards took place at Madison Square Garden in New York City. Beyoncé won eight awards, becoming the most-awarded act in the show's history, surpassing Madonna. Rihanna received the Michael Jackson Vanguard Award. Britney Spears makes her first performance in the show in nine years.
- 29 – With "Ride" charting at number-five and "Heathens" at four in the same week, the musical duo Twenty One Pilots became the third rock act with simultaneous top five Hot 100 singles in the chart's 58-year history, following only the Beatles and Elvis Presley, as well as the first act in 47 years.

=== September ===
- 30 – Solange releases her first studio album in eight years, A Seat at the Table.

=== October ===
- 7 – Green Day released the first studio album in four years, Revolution Radio
- 14 – JoJo released her first studio album in ten years, Mad Love.
- 21 – Lady Gaga released her fourth studio album, Joanne, which debuted at number 1 on the Billboard 200, making her the first woman of the 2010s to have four number one albums
- 28 – Dope released their first studio album in seven years, Blood Money Part 1.

=== November ===
- 2 – The 50th Annual CMA Awards took place live from the Bridgestone Arena in Nashville, Tennessee. Brad Paisley and Carrie Underwood returned to host for the ninth straight year.
- 4 – Alicia Keys released her first studio album in four years, HERE.
- 11 – A Tribe Called Quest released We Got It from Here... Thank You 4 Your Service, their first studio album since 1998 and also their final studio album.
- 18 – Metallica released their first studio album in eight years, Hardwired... to Self-Destruct.
- 20 – The American Music Awards took place live from the Microsoft Theater in Los Angeles. Ariana Grande won Artist of the Year.

=== December ===
- 12 – Live announced the return of original lead vocalist Ed Kowalczyk, who had left the band in 2009.
- 13 – Sundance Head won the eleventh season of The Voice. Billy Gillman was named runner-up. Wé McDonald and Josh Gallagher finishing third and fourth place respectively.
- 18 – Fifth Harmony announced that Camila Cabello had left the group.

== Bands formed ==
- Cruel Youth
- lovelytheband
- The Magpie Salute
- The Marías
- Mt. Joy
- Nation of Language
- Nightly
- PrettyMuch
- Prophets of Rage
- Vimic
- Why Don't We

== Bands reformed ==
- At the Drive-In
- Abandon All Ships
- The Anniversary
- Bash & Pop
- Belly
- Blake Babies
- Boss Hog
- The Damned Things
- A Different Breed of Killer
- Eric B. & Rakim
- Galactic Cowboys
- Game Theory
- G.R.L.
- Guided by Voices
- Hopesfall
- Le Tigre
- Letters to Cleo
- Misfits (featuring Glenn Danzig)
- Nasty Savage
- The Number Twelve Looks Like You
- Piebald
- P.S. Eliot
- Rainbow
- The Revolution
- The Righteous Brothers
- Squirrel Nut Zippers
- Stabbing Westward
- Stir
- A Thorn for Every Heart
- Temple of the Dog
- Thursday
- Tickle Me Pink
- The Union Underground

== Bands on hiatus ==
- Coal Chamber
- Flyleaf
- Man Overboard
- Middle Class Rut
- On An On
- We Are the in Crowd
- Yeah Yeah Yeahs

== Bands disbanded ==
- 3rdeyegirl
- Agalloch
- Aiden
- Augustines
- Bane
- The Belle Brigade
- Blood on the Dance Floor
- Chiodos
- Crosby, Stills, Nash & Young
- Dinner and a Suit
- Dream
- Eagles
- Edward Sharpe and the Magnetic Zeros
- Empire! Empire! (I Was a Lonely Estate)
- Fearless Vampire Killers
- Finch
- For Today
- Funeral for a Friend
- Gnashing of Teeth
- Gossip
- Haste the Day
- I, the Breather
- Joey + Rory
- Sharon Jones & The Dap-Kings
- A Lighter Shade of Brown
- Lionheart
- Matchbook Romance
- Maybeshewill
- Mischief Brew
- Motion City Soundtrack
- Mudvayne
- P.M. Dawn
- Thee Satisfaction
- School of Seven Bells
- Sockweb
- Sorry About Dresden
- The Stooges
- Suicide
- Trailer Choir
- Transit
- Twisted Sister
- You, Me, and Everyone We Know

== Albums released in 2016 ==
=== January ===
Date	Album	Artist	Genre (s)
1	In My Feelings (Goin’ Thru It)	Boosie Badazz	Hip hop
1	Wildfire	Rachel Platten	Pop
8	A War Against You	Ignite	Melodic hardcore
15	Malibu	Anderson. Paak	Hip hop; R&B; soul
15	The Casket Factory	Blaze Ya Dead Homie	Gangsta rap; horrorcore
15	Pawn Shop	Brothers Osborne	Country
15	Cuzznz	Daz and Snoop	West Coast hip hop; G-funk
15	Church Clothes 3	Lecrae	Christian hip hop; conscious hip hop
15	Death of a Bachelor	Panic! at the Disco	Hip hop; pop; rock
15	Nothing Shines Like Neon	Randy Rogers Band	Country
15	It's About Time	Hank Williams, Jr.	Country rock; Southern rock
21	Jesu/Sun Kil Moon	Jesu and Sun Kil Moon	Post-metal; indie folk; electronic music; ambient music; spoken word
22	The Boop-A-Doo	Cherry Poppin' Daddies	Jazz; swing
22	Debutante	Cait Brennan	Indie rock
22	Moth	Chairlift	Indie pop
22	New View	Eleanor Friedberger	
22	Perfect	Half Japanese	Art punk; indie rock
22	We Come Apart	Sonya Kitchell	
22	Dystopia	Megadeth	Thrash metal
22	99¢	Santigold	Art pop; alternative dance; new wave
22	Emotional Mugger	Ty Segall	Garage rock; hard rock; glam rock
22	Jet Plane and Oxbow	Shearwater	Indie rock; Sub Pop
22	Sex Love & Pain II	Tank	R&B; soul
22	The Catastrophist	Tortoise	Post-rock
22	Something About April II	Adrian Younge	Soul; R&B
29	Pillars of Ash	Black Tusk	
29	Bridges	Cavo	Hard rock
29	The Astonishing	Dream Theater	Progressive metal; progressive rock
29	Islah	Kevin Gates	Hip hop
29	American Appetite	Harriet	
29	Paper Plane	Anya Marina	Indie rock
29	Who Sold My Generation	Night Beats	Rock
29	X (No Absolutes)	Prong	
29	Nine Track Mind	Charlie Puth	Pop
29	Anti	Rihanna	R&B
29	New City Blues	Aubrie Sellers	Country; country pop
29	Let Me Get By	Tedeschi Trucks Band	Blues; Rock; R&B; Soul
29	MartyrLoserKing	Saul Williams	Alternative hip hop
29	10 Ways to Steal Home Plate	Wolfgang Gartner	Electro house

=== February ===
Date	Album	Artist	Genre (s)
5	Songs for the Late Night Drive Home	Anchor & Braille	Alternative rock; electronic rock; shoegazing; post-punk revival
5	Is the Is Are	DIIV	Indie rock; shoegazing; krautrock
5	Hellelujah	Drowning Pool	Heavy metal; alternative metal
5	Evol	Future	Hip hop, trap
5	The Driver	Charles Kelley	Country
5	I Don't Think It Is	Say Anything	Emo; pop punk
5	Porta Bohemica	Trixie Whitley	
5	The Ghosts of Highway 20	Lucinda Williams	Country
5	Khalifa	Wiz Khalifa	Hip hop
12	It's Not Over...The Hits So Far	Daughtry	Alternative rock; hard rock; pop rock; post-grunge
12	Oil & Water	Lee DeWyze	Folk; rock; pop
12	Down to My Last Bad Habit	Vince Gill	Country
12	Synitha	The Jezabels	Indie Rock
12	Letting Go...Slow	Lorrie Morgan	Country
12	Wynonna & the Big Noise	Wynonna Judd	Country
12	SVIIB	School of Seven Bells	Indie rock; dream pop
12	Family Dinner – Volume 2	Snarky Puppy	Jazz fusion
12	Life Screams	Lacey Sturm	Hard rock; Christian rock
14	Hymns That Are Important to Us	Joey + Rory	Christian country
14	The Life of Pablo	Kanye West	Hip hop
19	Painting With	Animal Collective	Experimental pop; psychedelic pop
19	Secrets	Deep Sea Diver	Indie rock
19	Need Your Light	Ra Ra Riot	Indie rock
21	Side A	Christina Grimmie	Pop; teen pop
26	For All Kings	Anthrax	Heavy metal; thrash metal
26	Anvil is Anvil	Anvil	Heavy metal; thrash metal
26	This Unruly Mess I've Made	Macklemore & Ryan Lewis	Hip hop
26	Dig in Deep	Bonnie Raitt	Blues; Americana; rock
26	Zoetic	The Rocket Summer	Alternative rock; pop rock; indie rock
26	Drinking from a Salt Pond	Run River North	Alternative rock; indie rock
26	Who Really Cares	TV Girl	Indie pop
26	Turning Point	Chuck Wicks	Country
29	Spirit Phone	Lemon Demon	Synth-pop; new wave; geek rock

=== March ===
Date	Album	Artist	Genre (s)
4	ColleGrove	2 Chainz	Hip hop
4	Piece by Piece Remixed	Kelly Clarkson	Pop; remixes
4	Protection	Face to Face	Punk rock
4	Folk Hop 'N Roll	Judah & the Lion	Americana; alternative
4	55	The Knocks	Electronic; EDM
4	Untitled Unmastered.	Kendrick Lamar	Hip hop; jazz rap; funk
4	Full Circle	Loretta Lynn	Country
4	You Know Who You Are	Nada Surf	Alternative rock
4	United Crushers	Polica	Synth pop
4	Remington	Granger Smith	Country
4	Limitless	Tonight Alive	Pop punk
4	We Can Do Anything	Violent Femmes	Rock; alternative rock
4	More Rain	M. Ward	Indie folk; indie rock
4	This Means War	ZZ Ward	Blues rock
4	Under the Covers	Ninja Sex Party	Rock, new wave, progressive rock, glam rock
8	Phone Power	They Might Be Giants	Alternative rock
11	Us and the Night	3 Doors Down	Alternative rock; post-grunge; hard rock; alternative metal
11	After Party	Adore Delano	Dance; Pop
11	All My Demons Greeting Me as a Friend	AURORA	Synthpop; folktroinica
11	Painkillers	Brian Fallon	Rock; alternative rock
11	3001: A Laced Odyssey	Flatbush Zombies	Hip hop
11	Fired Up	Randy Houser	Country
11	Incarnate	Killswitch Engage	Metalcore
11	Good Grief	Lucius	Indie pop; indie rock
18	Letting You In	Kris Allen	Pop rock; alternative rock
18	Post Pop Depression	Iggy Pop	Art rock; garage rock
18	Change of Fortune	Soul Asylum	Alternative rock
18	This Is What the Truth Feels Like	Gwen Stefani	Pop
25	Sept. 5	dvsn	R&B; PBR&B
25	XI	Metal Church	Heavy metal; thrash metal; speed metal; power metal
25	Patch the Sky	Bob Mould	Alternative rock; indie rock
25	We Disappear	The Thermals	Indie rock; lo-fi
25	Slime Season 3	Young Thug	Hip hop, trap
25	Stiff	White Denim	Indie rock, garage rock, progressive rock, psychedelic rock

=== April ===
Date	Album	Artist	Genre (s)
1	Kentucky	Black Stone Cherry	Hard rock; southern rock
1	Welcome the Worms	Bleached	Rock; punk rock
1	Changes	Charles Bradley	Soul
1	Bang, Zoom, Crazy... Hello	Cheap Trick	Rock
1	The Wilderness	Explosions in the Sky	Post-rock
1	Stories for Monday	The Summer Set	Pop rock; pop punk
1	TWENTY88	Twenty88	Hip Hop; Contemporary R&B
1	Acoustic	Unwritten Law	Acoustic
1	Weezer (White Album)	Weezer	Alternative rock; power pop
1	Amen & Goodbye	Yeasayer	Experimental rock; neo-psychedelia; progressive pop
8	Chasing Shadows (EP)	Angels & Airwaves	Alternative rock
8	Distortland	The Dandy Warhols	Alternative rock
8	Gore	Deftones	Alternative metal; post metal
8	Crazy Eyes	Filter	Industrial rock; rock
8	Man About Town	Mayer Hawthorne	R&B; soul; pop
8	Cleopatra	The Lumineers	Americana; folk rock; indie rock
8	Human Performance	Parquet Courts	Indie rock; art rock
8	Book of Shadows II	Zakk Wylde	Heavy Metal
15	You'll Pay for This	Bear Hands	Experimental rock; alternative rock; indie rock
15	Material	Blaqk Audio	Electronic; new wave
15	PersonA	Edward Sharpe and the Magnetic Zeros	Indie folk; indie rock
15	The Diary	J Dilla	Hip hop
15	Life on Earth	Musiq Soulchild	R&B
15	This Path Tonight	Graham Nash	Rock
15	Layers	Royce da 5'9"	Hip hop
15	Santana IV	Santana	Latin rock
15	Dreamland	Wild Belle	Psychedelic pop
20	OK	The Fall of Troy	Mathcore; post-hardcore; progressive rock
22	Always Strive and Prosper	ASAP Ferg	Hip hop
22	Home	Blue October	Rock; alternative rock
22	Disappearing in Airports	Candlebox	Alternative rock; post-grunge
22	Please Be Honest	Guided By Voices	Indie rock; lo-fi
22	Therapy Session	NF	Hip hop
22	Helter Seltzer	We Are Scientists	Indie rock
23	Lemonade	Beyoncé	R&B
29	American Hi-Fi Acoustic	American Hi-Fi	Acoustic
29	Reckless	Martina McBride	Country
29	Ohana	Pepper	Reggae rock; alternative rock
29	Better	Haley Reinhart	Pop; funk rock; soul; R&B; jazz fusion
29	Delusions of Grand Fur	Rogue Wave	Indie rock
29	Prayers for the Damned	Sixx:A.M.	Hard rock; alternative metal
29	Culcha Vulcha	Snarky Puppy	Jazz fusion
29	Dust	Tremonti	Thrash metal; Heavy metal
29	The Electric Warlock Acid Witch Satanic Orgy Celebration Dispenser	Rob Zombie	Heavy metal

=== May ===
Date	Album	Artist	Genre (s)
5	Acoustia	Alex Lloyd	Acoustic
6	The Blue Swell	Beverly	Indie pop; indie rock
6	Bottomless Pit	Death Grips	Experimental hip hop
6	Boxes	Goo Goo Dolls	Alternative rock
6	Detour	Cyndi Lauper	Country
6	At Night, Alone	Mike Posner	Singer-songwriter; indie folk
6	Washed Away	Rooney	Indie rock; power pop
6	You Should Be Here	Cole Swindell	Country
6	Ripcord	Keith Urban	Country; country pop
13	Night Sports	3OH!3	Alternative; hip hop
13	Coloring Book	Chance the Rapper	Hip hop, gospel rap
13	Trust no One	DevilDriver	Groove metal; melodic death metal
13	Cloud Nine	Kygo	Electronic
13	Playing with Fire	Jennifer Nettles	Country
13	Misadventures	Pierce the Veil	Alternative rock; punk rock
13	Thank You	Meghan Trainor	Dance-pop; R&B
18	Up at Night	Cimorelli	Teen pop
20	Drive (EP)	Amerie	R&B
20	Teens of Denial	Car Seat Headrest	Indie rock; lo-fi
20	I Still Do	Eric Clapton	Rock; blues; pop rock
20	Fallen Angels	Bob Dylan	Rock
20	Dangerous Woman	Ariana Grande	Pop
20	Along the Shadow	Saosin	Alternative rock; post-hardcore
20	If I'm Honest	Blake Shelton	Country
27	Black	Dierks Bentley	Country
27	Double Vanity	Broncho	Indie rock
27	The Evil Divide	Death Angel	Thrash metal
27	7/27	Fifth Harmony	Pop; R&B
27	Skin	Flume	Electronica
27	Good Times!	The Monkees	Pop rock
27	The Home Inside My Head	Real Friends	Pop punk
27	To Be Everywhere Is to Be Nowhere	Thrice	Post-hardcore

=== June ===
Date	Album	Artist	Genre (s)
3	Aggressive	Beartooth	Metalcore; hardcore punk
3	Obsessed	Dan + Shay	Country
3	Unden!able	Hellyeah	Heavy metal
3	A Whole Lot More to Me	Craig Morgan	Country
3	Hero	Maren Morris	Country
3	Summer	Cassadee Pope	Country; country pop
3	Stranger to Stranger	Paul Simon	Folk rock
3	Future Present Past (EP)	The Strokes	Indie rock; garage rock
3	Train Does Led Zeppelin II	Train	Rock; hard rock; blues rock
3	Reunion	Whitford/St. Holmes	Rock; hard rock
9	Tween	Wye Oak	Indie rock; indie folk
10	El Río	Frankie Ballard	Country
10	Why Are You OK	Band of Horses	Southern rock; indie rock
10	Big Day in a Small Town	Brandy Clark	Country
10	Fitz and the Tantrums	Fitz and the Tantrums	Indie pop; neo soul
10	Strange Little Birds	Garbage	Alternative rock
10	Wanderlust	Little Big Town	Country pop; psychedelic pop; R&B; folk; sunshine pop
10	Last Year Was Complicated	Nick Jonas	Pop
10	Egomaniac	KONGOS	Alternative rock
10	Love, Lies & Therapy	Saliva	Rock; nu metal
17	Friday Night	Will Butler	Indie rock; indie pop
17	Otero War	Caveman	Indie rock
17	The Fighters	LoCash	Country
17	California Sunrise	Jon Pardi	Country
17	The Getaway	Red Hot Chili Peppers	Rock
17	Some Things Never Leave You	Sherwood	Rock; indie rock; alternative rock
17	Still Brazy	YG	West coast hip hop
24	True Sadness	The Avett Brothers	Folk rock
24	Blood, Sweat & 3 Years	Cash Cash	Progressive house; electro house
24	The Magic	Deerhoof	Indie rock
24	On Desire	Drowners	Indie rock
24	Say It Out Loud	The Interrupters	Ska punk
24	Act One	Marian Hill	
24	Boom Boom Room (Side A)	Palaye Royale	Art rock
26	New English	Desiigner	Trap

=== July ===
Date	Album	Artist	Genre (s)
1	What We Live For	American Authors	Indie rock; pop rock
1	California	Blink-182	Punk rock; alternative rock; pop punk
1	FMA	Grace	Hip hop soul
1	Bobby Tarantino	Logic	Hip hop
1	blackSUMMER'S'night	Maxwell	R&B; soul
1	Coolaid	Snoop Dogg	West Coast hip hop
1	Waking at Dawn	Roy Woods	Hip hop; PBR&B
8	The North Corridor	Chevelle	Rock
8	Snapshots	Nine Days	Alternative rock
8	Blank Face LP	Schoolboy Q	Hip hop
8	Where the Light Shines Through	Switchfoot	Alternative rock; power pop
15	Savage Mode	21 Savage and Metro Boomin	Hip hop
15	Dirty Heads	Dirty Heads	Reggae rock; alternative rock
15	No Hard Feelings	Dreezy	Hip hop, R&B
15	Youth Authority	Good Charlotte	Pop punk; alternative rock
15	Kidz Bop 32	Kidz Bop Kids	Children's music; pop
15	Fighter	David Nail	Country
15	We're All Somebody From Somewhere	Steven Tyler	Country; Southern rock
22	Everybody Looking	Gucci Mane	Hip hop
22	Forever!	Hed PE	Rap rock; nu metal
22	Lil Durk 2X	Lil Durk	Hip hop, trap
22	Periphery III: Select Difficulty	Periphery	Metal; Djent
22	Air for Free	Relient K	Alternative rock; Christian rock
22	Lemon Parade Revisited	Tonic	Acoustic
29	Simplicity	The Bouncing Souls	Punk rock
29	Hypercaffium Spazzinate	Descendents	Punk rock; pop punk
29	Major Key	DJ Khaled	Hip hop
29	American Love	Jake Owen	Country
29	Love Remains	Hillary Scott & the Scott Family	Gospel
29	Generationwhy	Zhu	Electronic

=== August ===
Date	Album	Artist	Genre (s)
5	Bury Me in Boots	The Cadillac Three	Country
5	Give a Glimpse of What Yer Not	Dinosaur Jr.	Indie rock; alternative rock
5	Encore	DJ Snake	Electronic
5	Hurricane	Nick Fradiani	Pop
5	Girl Problems	Chris Lane	Country pop
5	Unleashed	Skillet	Christian metal; hard rock
5	Now 59	Various	Various artists
5	Boy King	Wild Beasts	Art rock; electronica; synth-funk; alternative rock
10	Sorry, Mom	Destroy Boys	Punk rock
11	Zone	JEFF the Brotherhood	Rock; indie rock
12	Fishing Blues	Atmosphere	Hip hop
12	And Then Like Lions	Blind Pilots	Indie folk; indie pop
12	Kinda Don't Care	Justin Moore	Country
12	Innocence Reaches	Of Montreal	Art pop; indie rock
12	PartyNextDoor 3	PartyNextDoor	R&B; PRB&B
12	SremmLife 2	Rae Sremmurd	Hip Hop; trap; PBR&B
12	Home of the Strange	Young the Giant	Indie rock; alternative rock
19	Bad Omens	Bad Omens	Metalcore; rock
19	Vacancy	Bayside	Punk rock; power pop
19	July 4	Carl Broemel	
19	Endless	Frank Ocean	Alternative R&B; alternative hip hop; dream pop
19	Pure & Simple	Dolly Parton	Country
19	DNA	Trapt	Hard rock; alternative metal
20	Blonde	Frank Ocean	Alternative R&B; dream pop; neo soul; hip hop
23	Self-ish	Will Wood and the Tapeworms	Dark cabaret; punk jazz; glam rock
26	Anything But Words	Banks & Steelz	East Coast hip-hop
26	This Album Does Not Exist	Dreamers	Alternative rock
26	Dig Your Roots	Florida Georgia Line	Country
26	As Seen on the Internet	Futuristic	Hip hop; Trap
26	I'm Alone, No You're Not	Joseph	Alternative pop; folk
26	Mangy Love	Cass McCombs	Indie rock; folk
26	It Doesn't Have to Make Sense	Ingrid Michaelson	Pop rock
26	Glory	Britney Spears	Pop
26	Encore: Movie Partners Sing Broadway	Barbra Streisand	Traditional pop
26	Stay Gold	Butch Walker	Alternative rock
26	Jeffery	Young Thug	Trap; hip hop

=== September ===
Date	Album	Artist	Genre (s)
2	Bad Vibrations	A Day to Remember	Metalcore; pop punk
2	The Sun's Tirade	Isaiah Rashad	Hip hop
2	Birds in the Trap Sing McKnight	Travis Scott	Hip hop; trap
6	My Kind of Christmas	Reba McEntire	Christmas; country; acoustic
9	They Don't Know	Jason Aldean	Country
9	Cold World	Of Mice & Men	Alternative metal; metalcore
9	Thin Line	Billy Ray Cyrus	Country
9	Pixie Queen	Anthony Green	Indie rock; emo
9	Big Mess	Grouplove	Indie rock; indie pop
9	Signs of Light	The Head and the Heart	Indie rock; indie folk
9	Leo Rising	Karmin	Pop
9	Sunlit Youth	Local Natives	Indie rock
9	Polar Similar	Norma Jean	Metalcore; post-hardcore
9	Low Tides	This Wild Life	Acoustic; emo
9	Acoustic Recordings 1998–2016	Jack White	Acoustic
9	Why?	Jacob Whitesides	Pop; Indie
9	Schmilco	Wilco	Folk rock; indie rock
16	Shape Shift with Me	Against Me!	Punk rock; indie rock
16	I Remember	AlunaGeorge	Alternative pop
16	Disappear Here	Bad Suns	Alternative rock
16	Legends Never Die	Chinx	Hip hop
16	Femejism	Deap Vally	Garage rock; alternative rock
16	Sinner	Aaron Lewis	Country
16	Braver Than We Are	Meat Loaf	Rock
16	The Divine Feminine	Mac Miller	Alternative hip hop
16	Tidal Wave	Taking Back Sunday	Rock
16	Hard II Love	Usher	R&B; hip hop; trap
23	The Art of Elegance	Kristin Chenoweth	
23	If You See Me, Say Yes	Flock of Dimes	Indie rock; indie folk
23	West of the West	Goldroom	Electronic; electropop
23	Natural Causes	Skylar Grey	Alternative pop
23	The Healing Component	Mick Jenkins	Hip hop
23	I Had a Dream That You Were Mine	Hamilton Leithauser + Rostam	Indie rock
23	idina.	Idina Menzel	Pop
23	Illuminate	Shawn Mendes	Pop
23	Chapter and Verse	Bruce Springsteen	Rock
23	Heads Up	Warpaint	Indie rock
23	Swimmin' Pools, Movie Stars	Dwight Yoakam	Country
27	Atrocity Exhibition	Danny Brown	Alternative hip hop
30	The Altar	Banks	Alternative R&B
30	22, A Million	Bon Iver	Indie folk; folktronica
30	Where'd Your Weekend Go?	The Mowgli's	Alternative rock
30	Head Carrier	Pixies	Alternative rock; indie rock
30	A Seat at the Table	Solange	Alternative R&B; neo soul
30	Remember Us To Life	Regina Spektor	Indie pop
30	Blue Mountain	Bob Weir	Folk rock
30	Yellowcard	Yellowcard	Alternative rock; pop punk
30	Superlow	Warehouse	Art rock; post-punk

=== October ===
Date	Album	Artist	Genre (s)
7	The Last Hero	Alter Bridge	Alternative metal
7	Light We Made	Balance and Composure	Emo; post-grunge
7	Mothership	Dance Gavin Dance	Post-hardcore; experimental rock
7	Sit Still, Look Pretty	Daya	Pop
7	Revolution Radio	Green Day	Punk rock
7	Day Breaks	Norah Jones	Jazz; pop rock
7	First Ditch Effort	NOFX	Punk rock
7	Oh My My	OneRepublic	Pop rock
7	Three	Phantogram	Electro rock; dream pop
7	Big Boat	Phish	Rock
7	Upside Down	Set It Off	Alternative rock; pop rock; pop punk
8	The Beer Sessions	Sponge	Alternative rock; rock
14	Drunk Dynasty	Bowling for Soup	Pop punk
14	_	BT	Ambient; electronica
14	Dissociation	The Dillinger Escape Plan	Mathcore; metalcore
14	The Heart Watches While the Brain Burns	Mike Doughty	Indie rock
14	1992	The Game	West Coast hip hop; gangsta rap
14	Woptober	Gucci Mane	Hip hop; trap
14	Kevin Hart: What Now? (The Mixtape Presents Chocolate Droppa)	Kevin Hart	Hip hop
14	Mad Love	JoJo	Pop; R&B; Soul
14	Walls	Kings of Leon	Rock
14	Ruminations	Conor Oberst	Indie rock; folk
14	Two Tongues Two	Two Tongues	Indie rock; pop punk
14	It Must Be Christmas	Chris Young	Christmas; country
21	Lighthouse	David Crosby	Rock
21	Big Baby D.R.A.M.	DRAM	Hip hop; trap
21	Excommunication	Tyler Glenn	Pop rock
21	Lifelines	I Prevail	Post-hardcore; metalcore; pop-punk
21	Integrity Blues	Jimmy Eat World	Rock
21	The Serenity of Suffering	KoЯn	Nu metal
21	Joanne	Lady Gaga	Pop
21	Love Gloom	Night Riots	Alternative rock
21	A Pentatonix Christmas	Pentatonix	A capella; Christmas
21	Alone	The Pretenders	Rock
21	Who You Selling For	The Pretty Reckless	Rock; hard rock
21	saintmotelevision	Saint Motel	Indie pop
28	The Stage	Avenged Sevenfold	Heavy metal; progressive Metal
28	'Tis the SeaSon	Jimmy Buffett	Christmas
28	Cosmic Hallelujah	Kenny Chesney	Country
28	New Skin	CRX	Hard rock; garage rock; industrial rock
28	Blood Money Part 1	Dope	Nu metal; alternative metal
28	Glow	Brett Eldredge	Christmas; country
28	Someday at Christmas	Jackie Evancho	Christmas; classical crossover
28	Parachutes	Frank Iero and the Patience	Post-hardcore; alternative rock
28	Dead to the World	Helmet	Alternative metal
28	Trap or Die 3	Jeezy	Hip hop; trap
28	DC4	Meek Mill	Hip hop; trap
28	This Light I Hold	Memphis May Fire	Metalcore
28	I Dreamt I Was a Cowboy	Miniature Tigers	Indie pop; indie rock
28	A Very Kacey Christmas	Kacey Musgraves	Christmas; country
28	To Celebrate Christmas	Jennifer Nettles	Christmas; country
28	'Tis the Season	Jordan Smith	Christmas
28	Brotherhood of the Snake	Testament	Thrash metal

=== November ===
Date	Album	Artist	Genre (s)
4	This House Is Not for Sale	Bon Jovi	Rock
4	Eternally Even	Jim James	Indie rock; psychedelic rock
4	Here	Alicia Keys	R&B; hip hop; soul
4	SafetySuit	SafetySuit	Alternative rock; pop rock
4	Nightride	Tinashe	Alternative R&B
11	Christmas Together	Garth Brooks and Trisha Yearwood	Christmas; country
11	Tattooed Heart	Ronnie Dunn	Country
11	My Name Is Joe Thomas	Joe	R&B
11	Simply Christmas	Leslie Odom Jr.	Christmas
11	Coke N Butter	O.T. Genasis	Hip hop
11	Slugger	Sad13	Indie rock
11	Jessica Rabbit	Sleigh Bells	Indie pop; noise pop
11	We Got It from Here... Thank You 4 Your Service	A Tribe Called Quest	Hip hop; alternative hip hop; jazz rap
18	Free 6LACK	6LACK	R&B; Hip hop
18	DNCE	DNCE	Pop
18	The D-Boy Diary: Book 1	E-40	Hip hop
18	The D-Boy Diary: Book 2	E-40	Hip hop
18	Dear Life	High Valley	Country
18	The Boy Who Died Wolf	Highly Suspect	Hard rock; alternative rock
18	Don't Waste Your Wishes	The Killers	Christmas
18	The Weight of These Wings	Miranda Lambert	Country
18	24K Magic	Bruno Mars	Pop; R&B
18	Nemesis	Bridgit Mendler	Pop
18	Hardwired...to Self-Destruct	Metallica	Thrash metal
18	An Odd Entrances	Thee Oh Sees	Garage rock; psychedelic rock
25	Gunslinger	Garth Brooks	Country

=== December ===
Date	Album	Artist	Genre (s)
2	"Awaken, My Love!"	Childish Gambino	R&B
2	Darkness and Light	John Legend	R&B
2	Golden Silence	The Narrative	Indie pop; synth-pop
2	Don't Smoke Rock	Smoke DZA, Pete Rock	Hip-hop
9	4 Your Eyez Only	J. Cole	Hip-hop
9	Peace Trail	Neil Young	
9	Stoney	Post Malone	Hip-hop
9	The Storm	Tech N9ne	Hip-hop
9	Do What Thou Wilt.	Ab-Soul	Hip-hop
9	Fireplace: TheNotTheOtherSide	Hodgy	Hip-hop
9	Hamilton, Charles	Charles Hamilton	Hip-hop
16	Passion, Pain & Demon Slayin'	Kid Cudi	Hip-hop
16	The Return of East Atlanta Santa	Gucci Mane	Hip-hop; trap
22	Beautiful Crutch	Dommin	Rock; alternative rock
23	Not the Actual Events (EP)	Nine Inch Nails	Industrial Rock
23	White Friday (CM9)	Yo Gotti	Hip-hop
25	Run the Jewels 3	Run the Jewels	Hip-hop

== Top songs on record ==
=== Billboard Hot 100 No. 1 Songs ===
- "Black Beatles" – Rae Sremmurd feat. Gucci Mane (6 weeks)
- "Can't Stop the Feeling!" – Justin Timberlake (1 week)
- "Cheap Thrills" – Sia feat. Sean Paul (4 weeks)
- "Closer" – The Chainsmokers feat. Halsey (12 weeks)
- "Hello" – Adele (7 weeks in 2015, 3 weeks in 2016)
- "Love Yourself" – Justin Bieber (2 weeks)
- "One Dance" – Drake feat. Wizkid and Kyla (10 weeks)
- "Pillowtalk" – Zayn (1 week)
- "Sorry" – Justin Bieber (3 weeks)
- "Work" – Rihanna feat. Drake (9 weeks)

=== Billboard Hot 100 Top 20 Hits ===
All songs that reached the Top 20 on the Billboard Hot 100 chart during the year, complete with peak chart placement.

- "2 Phones" – Kevin Gates (#17)
- "24K Magic" – Bruno Mars (#4)
- "6 Inch" – Beyoncé feat. The Weeknd (#18)
- "679" – Fetty Wap feat. Remy Boyz (#4 in 2015, No. 11 in 2016)
- "7 Years" – Lukas Graham (#2)
- "Adventure of a Lifetime" – Coldplay (#13)
- "All I Want for Christmas Is You" – Mariah Carey (#11)
- "All We Know" – The Chainsmokers feat. Phoebe Ryan (#18)
- "Antidote" – Travis Scott (#16)
- "Back to Sleep" – Chris Brown (#20)
- "Bad Things" – Machine Gun Kelly and Camila Cabello (#10)
- "Black Beatles" – Rae Sremmurd feat. Gucci Mane (#1)
- "Broccoli" – DRAM feat. Lil Yachty (#5)
- "Cake by the Ocean" – DNCE (#9)
- "Can't Feel My Face" – The Weeknd (#1 in 2015, No. 15 in 2016)
- "Can't Stop the Feeling!" – Justin Timberlake (#1)
- "Caroline" – Aminé (#12)
- "Cheap Thrills" – Sia feat. Sean Paul (#1)
- "Close" – Nick Jonas feat. Tove Lo (#14)
- "Closer" – The Chainsmokers feat. Halsey (#1)
- "Cold Water" – Major Lazer feat. Justin Bieber and MØ (#2)
- "Controlla" – Drake (#16)
- "Dangerous Woman" – Ariana Grande (#8)
- "Deja Vu" – J. Cole (#7)
- "Don't" – Bryson Tiller (#13)
- "Don't Let Me Down" – The Chainsmokers feat. Daya (#3)
- "Don't Mind" – Kent Jones (#8)
- "Don't Wanna Know" – Maroon 5 feat. Kendrick Lamar (#7)
- "Down in the DM" – Yo Gotti feat. Nicki Minaj (#13)
- "Ex's & Oh's" – Elle King (#10 in 2015, No. 14 in 2016)
- "Fake Love" – Drake (#10)
- "For Free" – DJ Khaled feat. Drake (#13)
- "Formation" – Beyoncé (#10)
- "Gold" – Kiiara (#13)
- "Hands to Myself" – Selena Gomez (#7)
- "Heathens" – Twenty One Pilots (#2)
- "Hello" – Adele (#1)
- "Here" – Alessia Cara (#5)
- "Hold Up" – Beyoncé (#13)
- "H.O.L.Y." – Florida Georgia Line (#14)
- "Hotline Bling" – Drake (#2 in 2015, No. 3 in 2016)
- "I Don't Wanna Live Forever" – Zayn and Taylor Swift (#6)
- "I Hate U, I Love U" – Gnash feat. Olivia O'Brien (#10)
- "I Know What You Did Last Summer" – Shawn Mendes and Camila Cabello (#20)
- "I Took a Pill in Ibiza" – Mike Posner (#4)
- "Immortal" – J. Cole (#11)
- "In the Night" – The Weeknd (#12)
- "Into You" – Ariana Grande (#13)
- "Juju on that Beat (TZ Anthem)" – Zay Hilfigerrr and Zayion McCall (#5)
- "Jumpman" – Drake and Future (#12)
- "Just Like Fire" – Pink (#10)
- "Let It Go" – James Bay (#16)
- "Let Me Love You" – DJ Snake feat. Justin Bieber (#4)
- "Like I'm Gonna Lose You" – Meghan Trainor feat. John Legend (#8 in 2015, No. 9 in 2016)
- "Little Red Corvette" – Prince (#6 in 1983, No. 20 in 2016)
- "Love on the Brain" – Rihanna (#20)
- "Love Yourself" – Justin Bieber (#1)
- "Low Life" – Future feat. The Weeknd (#18)
- "Luv" – Tory Lanez (#19)
- "Make Me..." – Britney Spears feat. G-Eazy (#17)
- "Me, Myself & I" – G-Eazy and Bebe Rexha (#7)
- "Me Too" – Meghan Trainor (#13)
- "Middle" – DJ Snake feat. Bipolar Sunshine (#20)
- "My House" – Flo Rida (#4)
- "Needed Me" – Rihanna (#7)
- "Neighbors" – J. Cole (#13)
- "Never Be like You" – Flume feat. Kai (#20)
- "Never Forget You" – Zara Larsson and MNEK (#13)
- "No" – Meghan Trainor (#3)
- "On My Mind" – Ellie Goulding (#13 in 2015, No. 14 in 2016)
- "One Call Away" – Charlie Puth (#12)
- "One Dance" – Drake feat. Wizkid and Kyla (#1)
- "Ooouuu" – Young M.A (#19)
- "Oui" – Jeremih (#19)
- "Panda" – Desiigner (#1)
- "Party Monster" – The Weeknd (#16)
- "Perfect Illusion" – Lady Gaga (#15)
- "Piece by Piece" – Kelly Clarkson (#8)
- "Pillowtalk" – Zayn (#1)
- "Pop Style" – Drake feat. The Throne (#16)
- "Purple Rain" – Prince and The Revolution (#2 in 1984, No. 4 in 2016)
- "Ride" – Twenty One Pilots (#5)
- "Rise" – Katy Perry (#11)
- "Roses" – The Chainsmokers feat. ROZES (#6)
- "Same Old Love" – Selena Gomez (#5)
- "Scars to Your Beautiful" – Alessia Cara (#13)
- "Send My Love (To Your New Lover)" – Adele (#8)
- "Side to Side" – Ariana Grande feat. Nicki Minaj (#4)
- "Sorry" – Beyoncé (#11)
- "Sorry" – Justin Bieber (#1)
- "Starboy" – The Weeknd feat. Daft Punk (#2)
- "Starving" – Hailee Steinfeld and Grey feat. Zedd (#12)
- "Stitches" – Shawn Mendes (#4 in 2015, No. 6 in 2016)
- "Stressed Out" – Twenty One Pilots (#2)
- "Sucker for Pain" – Lil Wayne, Wiz Khalifa and Imagine Dragons with Logic and Ty Dolla $ign featuring X Ambassadors (#15)
- "Summer Sixteen" – Drake (#6)
- "The Greatest" – Sia feat. Kendrick Lamar (#18)
- "The Hills" – The Weeknd (#1 in 2015, No. 7 in 2016)
- "This Is What You Came For" – Calvin Harris feat. Rihanna (#3)
- "Too Good" – Drake feat. Rihanna (#14)
- "Treat You Better" – Shawn Mendes (#6)
- "Unsteady" – X Ambassadors (#20)
- "Used to This" – Future feat. Drake (#14)
- "Watch Me (Whip/Nae Nae)" – Silentó (#3 in 2015, No. 19 in 2016)
- "We Don't Talk Anymore" – Charlie Puth feat. Selena Gomez (#9)
- "What Do You Mean?" – Justin Bieber (#1 in 2015, No. 5 in 2016)
- "When Doves Cry" – Prince (#1 in 1984, No. 8 in 2016)
- "When We Were Young" – Adele (#14)
- "White Iverson" – Post Malone (#14)
- "Wildest Dreams" – Taylor Swift (#5 in 2015, No. 18 in 2016)
- "Work" – Rihanna feat. Drake (#1)
- "Work from Home" – Fifth Harmony feat. Ty Dolla $ign (#4)

== Deaths ==
- January 1 – Gilbert Kaplan, 74, conductor
- January 2 – Brad Fuller, 62, composer
- January 3 – Jason Mackenroth, 46, drummer (Rollins Band, Mother Superior)
- January 4 – Long John Hunter, 84, blues singer-songwriter and guitarist
- January 5
  - Nicholas Caldwell, 71, singer (The Whispers)
  - Elizabeth Swados, 64, composer
- January 7
  - Robert M. Cundick, 89, organist and composer
  - Kitty Kallen, 94, singer
  - Troy Shondell, 76, singer-songwriter
- January 8
  - Otis Clay, 73, R&B singer
  - Red Simpson, 81, country singer-songwriter
  - Brett Smiley, 60, singer-songwriter
- January 10 – David Bowie, 69, singer-songwriter and actor
- January 13 – Bern Herbolsheimer, 67 composer
- January 15
  - Noreen Corcoran, 72, singer
  - Pete Huttlinger, 54, guitarist
- January 16 – Gary Loizzo, 70, singer, guitarist, and producer (The American Breed)
- January 17
  - Blowfly, 76, singer-songwriter and producer
  - Mic Gillette, 64, bass player (Tower of Power and Sons of Champlin)
  - Ramblin' Lou Schriver, 86, country singer
- January 18 – Glenn Frey, 67, singer-songwriter and guitarist (Eagles)
- January 20 – Lee Abramson, 45, bass player and composer
- January 22 – Cadalack Ron, 34, rapper
- January 26
  - Margaret Pardee, 95, violinist
  - T.J. Tindall, 65, guitarist (MFSB)
- January 28
  - Signe Toly Anderson, 74, singer (Jefferson Airplane and KBC Band)
  - Paul Kantner, 74, singer-songwriter and guitarist (Jefferson Airplane, Jefferson Starship, and KBC Band)
- January 29 – Billy Faier, 85, banjo player
- February 1 – Jon Bunch, 45, singer-songwriter (Sense Field and Further Seems Forever)
- February 3
  - Big Kap, 45, hip-hop DJ and producer
  - Maurice White, 74 singer-songwriter and producer (Earth, Wind & Fire)
- February 4
  - Leslie Bassett, 93, composer
  - Joe Dowell, 76, singer
  - Jimmie Haskell, 79, composer and conductor
- February 5 – Ray Colcord, 66, composer
- February 6
  - Dan Hicks, 74, singer-songwriter, guitarist, and drummer (The Charlatans)
  - Sam Spence, 88, composer
- February 8 – Ken Delo, 77, singer (The Lawrence Welk Show)
- February 11
  - Bob Raymond, 69, bassist (Sugarloaf)
  - Kim Williams, 68, songwriter
- February 12 – George Tipton, 84, composer and conductor
- February 14
  - Steven Stucky, 66, composer
  - L. C. Ulmer, 87, blues singer-songwriter
- February 15
  - Louis Lane, 92, conductor
  - Joyce Paul, 78, singer
  - Vanity, 57, singer-songwriter (Vanity 6)
- February 17 – Ray West, 90, sound mixer (Star Wars Episode IV: A New Hope)
- February 18 – Paul Gordon, 52, keyboard player and producer (New Radicals and The B-52's)
- February 21 – Betty Jane Watson, 94, singer
- February 22 – Sonny James, 87, country singer-songwriter
- February 24 – Lennie Baker, 69, singer and saxophonist (Sha Na Na and Danny & the Juniors)
- February 26 – C. L. Blast, 81, soul singer
- March 1
  - Gayle McCormick, 67, singer (Smith)
  - Martha Wright, 92, singer
- March 3 – Gavin Christopher, 66, R&B singer-songwriter and producer
- March 4
  - Bankroll Fresh, 28, rapper
  - Joey Feek, 40, country singer (Joey + Rory)
- March 5
  - Jimmy Henderson, 61, rock guitarist (Black Oak Arkansas)
  - Chip Hooper, 53, talent agent
- March 6 – Aaron Huffman, 43, bassist (Harvey Danger)
- March 7 – Joe Cabot, 94, jazz trumpeter and bandleader
- March 8 – Ron Jacobs, 78, producer, co-creator of American Top 40
- March 9
  - Karen Carroll, 58, singer
  - Ray Griff, 75, country singer
- March 10
  - Ernestine Anderson, 87, singer
  - Gogi Grant, 91, singer
- March 11
  - Joe Ascione, 54, jazz drummer
  - Shawn Elliott, 79, singer
  - Ruth Terry, 95, singer and actress
- March 12 – Tommy Brown, 84, R&B singer
- March 13 – Sidney Mear, 97, trumpeter
- March 15 – Daryl Coley, 60, gospel singer
- March 16 – Frank Sinatra, Jr., 72, singer-songwriter
- March 17 – Steve Young, 73, country singer-songwriter
- March 18
  - David Egan, 61, singer-songwriter
  - Ned Miller, 90, country singer-songwriter
- March 22 – Phife Dawg, 45, rapper (A Tribe Called Quest)
- March 23 – James Jamerson, Jr., 58, bass player (Chanson)
- March 25 – Shannon Bolin, 99, actress and singer
- March 26 – David Baker, 84, composer
- March 29 – Patty Duke, 69, singer
- March 30 – Frankie Michaels, 60, singer
- March 31 – Terry Plumeri, 71, bassist, composer, and conductor
- April 2 – Gato Barbieri, 83, jazz saxophonist and composer
- April 3 – Bill Henderson, 90, jazz singer
- April 4 – Carlo Mastrangelo, 78, doo-wop singer and bassist (The Belmonts)
- April 5
  - Leon Haywood, 74, singer-songwriter and producer
  - Zena Latto, 90, jazz clarinetist and saxophonist
- April 6
  - Dennis Davis, 66, drummer
  - Merle Haggard, 79, country singer-songwriter and guitarist
- April 7 – Jimmie Van Zant, 59, singer-songwriter and guitarist
- April 8 – Jack Hammer, 90, singer-songwriter and pianist
- April 9 – Tony Conrad, 76, composer
- April 12 – Gib Guilbeau, 78, musician and songwriter (The Flying Burrito Brothers)
- April 13
  - Jeremy Steig, 73, jazz flutist
  - Pete Yellin, 74, jazz saxophonist
- April 18 – Brian Asawa, 49, opera singer
- April 19
  - Richard Lyons, 57, experimental musician (Negativland)
  - Pete Zorn, 65, multi-instrumentalist (Steeleye Span)
- April 21
  - Lonnie Mack, 74, singer-songwriter and guitarist
  - Prince, 57, musician, singer-songwriter
- April 24 – Billy Paul, 81, soul singer
- April 25 – Remo Belli, 88, jazz drummer
- May 7 – John Stabb, 54, singer (Government Issue)
- May 12 – Julius La Rosa, 86, singer
- May 13 – Buster Cooper, 87, jazz trombonist
- May 14
  - Johnny Sea, 75, country music singer
  - Paul Smoker, 75, composer and jazz trumpeter
- May 15 – Jane Little, 87, classical double bass player (Atlanta Symphony Orchestra)
- May 16 – Emilio Navaira, 53, singer-songwriter
- May 17 – Guy Clark, 74, singer-songwriter
- May 21 – Nick Menza, 51, drummer and instrumentalist (Megadeth, OHM)
- May 27 – Marshall "Rock" Jones, 75, bassist (Ohio Players)
- May 28 – Floyd Robinson, 83, country singer
- May 30 – Thomas Fekete, 27, guitarist (Surfer Blood)
- June 4 – Phyllis Curtin, 94, soprano
- June 8 – Norro Wilson, 79, country music singer-songwriter and record producer
- June 9 – J. Reilly Lewis, 71, choral conductor and Baroque music specialist
- June 10 – Christina Grimmie, 22, singer-songwriter
- June 12 – Chris Warren, 49, singer and musician
- June 13
  - Anahid Ajemian, 92, violinist
  - Randy Jones, 72, jazz drummer (Chet Baker, Dave Brubeck, Maynard Ferguson)
  - Chips Moman, 79, songwriter and record producer
- June 16
  - Jerome Teasley, 67, soul drummer
  - Charles Thompson, 98, jazz pianist
- June 17 – Attrell Cordes, 46, singer and rapper (P.M. Dawn)
- June 20 – Bill Ham, 79, manager (ZZ Top)
- June 21 – Wayne Jackson, 74, trumpeter (Mar-Keys, The Memphis Horns)
- June 22 – Steve French, 56, gospel singer
- June 23
  - Shelley Moore, 84, jazz singer
  - Ralph Stanley, 89, singer and banjoist (The Stanley Brothers)
- June 24 – Bernie Worrell, 72, keyboardist (Parliament-Funkadelic)
- June 26 – Mike Pedicin, 98, saxophonist and jazz bandleader
- June 27 – Sir Mack Rice, 82, singer-songwriter
- June 28 – Scotty Moore, 84, guitarist (Elvis Presley)
- June 29
  - Stan Harper, 94, virtuoso harmonica player, arranger and composer
  - Rob Wasserman, 64, composer and bassist
- June 30 – Don Friedman, 81, jazz pianist
- July 3 – Richard Grayson, 75, composer and pianist
- July 5 – Gladys Nordenstrom, 92, composer
- July 6 – Danny Smythe, 67, drummer (The Box Tops)
- July 9
  - Geneviève Castrée, 34, singer and guitarist
  - Maralin Niska, 89, operatic soprano
  - Carole Switala, 69, singer and voice actress
- July 14 – Lisa Gaye, 81, actress, singer and dancer
- July 15
  - Charles Davis, 83, jazz saxophonist
  - Erik Petersen, 38, singer-songwriter and multi-instrumentalist (Mischief Brew)
- July 16
  - Bonnie Brown, 77, singer (The Browns)
  - Alan Vega, 78, singer (Suicide)
  - Claude Williamson, 89, jazz pianist
- July 17 – Gary S. Paxton, 77, record producer, singer-songwriter (Skip & Flip, The Hollywood Argyles)
- July 21 – Lewie Steinberg, 82, bassist (Booker T. & the M.G.'s)
- July 22 – Dominic Duval, 71, free jazz bassist
- July 24 – Marni Nixon, 86, singer
- July 25 – Allan Barnes, 66, jazz saxophonist (The Blackbyrds)
- July 26 – Sandy Pearlman, 72, record producer and band manager (Blue Öyster Cult, The Clash, Black Sabbath)
- July 27 – Pat Upton, 75, singer, guitarist, songwriter (Spiral Starecase)
- July 30 – Gloria DeHaven, 91, actress and singer
- August 3 – Ricci Martin, 62, musician and singer, son of Dean Martin
- August 4 – Patrice Munsel, 91, coloratura soprano
- August 5 – Richard Fagan, 69, songwriter and musician
- August 6 – Pete Fountain, 86, jazz clarinetist
- August 7
  - B. E. Taylor, 65, singer
  - Ruby Winters, 74, soul singer
- August 11 – Glenn Yarbrough, 86, folk singer
- August 12 – Ruby Wilson, 68, blues and gospel singer
- August 13 – Connie Crothers, 75, jazz pianist
- August 14
  - DJ Official, 39, Christian hip hop musician (116 Clique)
  - James Woolley, 49, keyboardist (Nine Inch Nails)
- August 15 – Bobby Hutcherson, 75, jazz vibraphone and marimba player
- August 17 – Preston Hubbard, 63, bassist (The Fabulous Thunderbirds)
- August 19 – Lou Pearlman, 62, record producer and manager (Backstreet Boys, NSYNC)
- August 20
  - Irving Fields, 101, pianist
  - Matt Roberts, 38, guitarist (3 Doors Down)
  - Louis Smith, 85, jazz trumpeter
- August 25 – Rudy Van Gelder, 91, recording engineer
- August 30 – Hoot Hester, 65, country music and bluegrass artist (The Time Jumpers)
- September 1
  - Fred Hellerman, 89, folk singer, guitarist, songwriter (The Weavers)
  - Kacey Jones, 66, singer-songwriter
- September 2 – Jerry Heller, 75, music manager (N.W.A.)
- September 6 – Clifford Curry, 79, R&B singer
- September 16 – Jerry Corbetta, 68, singer-songwriter and keyboardist (Sugarloaf)
- September 17 – Charmian Carr, 73, actress and singer
- September 19 – Bobby Breen, 87, actor and singer
- September 20 – Micki Marlo, 88, singer and model
- September 21
  - John D. Loudermilk, 82, singer and songwriter
  - Shawty Lo, 40, rapper
- September 24 – Buckwheat Zydeco, 68, accordionist and zydeco musician
- September 25
  - Michael Jones (aka Kashif), 59, multi-instrumentalist, singer, songwriter, record producer (B.T. Express)
  - Jean Shepard, 82, singer-songwriter
- October 8 – Don Ciccone, 70, singer-songwriter (The Critters)
- October 24 – Bobby Vee, 73, pop singer
- October 27 – John Zacherle, 98, television and radio personality, novelty singer
- November 3 – Kay Starr, 94, jazz and pop singer
- November 11 – Victor Bailey, 56, jazz bassist
- November 13 – Leon Russell, 74, singer
- November 14 – Holly Dunn, 59, singer
- November 18 – Sharon Jones, 60, soul singer (Sharon Jones & The Dap-Kings)
- November 29 – Allan Zavod, 71, keyboardist (Frank Zappa, Jean-Luc Ponty, Eric Clapton, etc.)
- December 2 – Mark Gray, 64, singer, songwriter, and keyboardist (Exile)
- December 4 – Ralph Johnson, 67, singer (The Impressions)
- December 7 – Brian Bennett, 65, garage-rock keyboardist (The Cherry Slush)
- December 11 – Joe Ligon, 80, gospel singer (Mighty Clouds of Joy)
- December 19 – Andrew Dorff, 40, songwriter
- December 25 – Alphonse Mouzon, 68, jazz fusion drummer
- December 25 – George Michael, 53, singer-songwriter and producer (Wham!)
- December 28 – Debbie Reynolds, 84, actress and singer

== See also ==
- 2010s in music
- 2016 in music
