= Head of Roses =

2021 studio album by Flock of Dimes

Studio album by Flock of Dimes
- Released: April 2, 2021
- Recorded: July 2020
- Studio: Betty's (Chapel Hill, North Carolina)
- Length: 40:40
- Label: Sub Pop
- Producers: Nick Sanborn; Jenn Wasner

Flock of Dimes chronology
Like So Much Desire (2020)	Head of Roses (2021)	Head of Roses: Phantom Limb (2022)

Singles from Head of Roses
- 1. "Two" Released: February 3, 2021; 2. "Price of Blue" Released: February 25, 2021; 3. "Hard Way" Released: March 16, 2021; 4. "One More Hour" Released: March 30, 2021

Head of Roses is the second studio album by the American singer-songwriter Jenn Wasner under the pseudonym Flock of Dimes, released on April 2, 2021 through the independent record label Sub Pop.

== Background and recording ==
With the onset of the COVID-19 pandemic in 2020 and the subsequent lockdown, Jenn Wasner spent her time – which would have otherwise been spent on tour – focusing on music. At her home in Durham, North Carolina, she recorded the material for an extended play entitled Like So Much Desire, which would be later surprise released in June as her debut on the independent label Sub Pop. Also during isolation, Wasner had been reckoning with the emotional consequences of the dissolution of her two most recent relationships, and had decided to channel these experiences into writing a new album, her second as Flock of Dimes following 2016's If You See Me, Say Yes.

The majority of the songs that would end up on the album were written during the brief period between March to April 2020, with the exception of some songs such as "Two" or "2 Heads", the latter written back in 2015. In July, she managed to bring together a number of collaborators to record at Sylvan Esso's studio, Betty's, conveniently near her Durham home. The album was produced by Wasner with Sylvan Esso's Nick Sanborn, with contributions from Sanborn and others such as Meg Duffy on guitar, Matt McCaughan of Bon Iver on drums, Adam Schatz of Landlady on saxophone, and Andy Stack (the other half of Wye Oak with Wasner) on cello.

== Promotion and singles ==
On February 3, 2021, Wasner announced Head of Roses with its track listing, cover art, and lead single "Two". The song was accompanied by a music video that was directed by Lola B. Pierson and Cricket Arrison and starred Arrison and Wasner. With duality as the theme, the video shows its co-stars who live opposing daily schedules meet together at the middle of three consecutive days.

In contrast to the majority of the album, "Two" was conceived before pandemic lockdown began in March 2020. Whereas most of Head of Roses had been written in the context of the breakdown of a relationship, "Two" relates to the beginning of one. According to an interview with Stereogum, she was "in a more optimistic and upbeat kind of headspace" during the writing process, allowing her to more freely explore what constitutes an appropriate level of dependency between partners. In April, "Two" charted in the US on Billboard's Adult Alternative Airplay Chart at no. 39.

Three more singles were released in anticipation of Head of Roses: "Price of Blue" on February 25, "Hard Way" on March 16, and "One More Hour" on March 30.

== Release ==
Head of Roses was released on April 2, 2021, Flock of Dimes' first full-length record on Sub Pop. It peaked on the UK Record Store Chart at no. 15.

== Critical reception ==
Professional ratings
Aggregate scores
Source	Rating
AnyDecentMusic?	7.4/10
Metacritic	79/100
Review scores
Source	Rating
AllMusic	4/5 stars
Beats Per Minute	83%
The Independent	4/5 stars
The Line of Best Fit	7/10
Mojo	3/5 stars
MusicOMH	4/5 stars
Paste	8.1/10
Pitchfork	7.5/10
Uncut	8/10
Under the Radar	7.5/10

According to the review aggregator Metacritic, Dim Probs received "generally favorable reviews" based on a weighted average score of 79 out of 100 from 11 critic scores. On another aggregator AnyDecentMusic?, it was given an average of 7.4 out of 10 based on a different sample of 11 critical reviews.

=== Year-end lists ===
Publication	List	Rank	Ref.
Stereogum	The 50 Best Albums of 2021	48	
Under the Radar	Top 100 Albums of 2021	30	

== Track listing ==
All tracks are written by Jenn Wasner, except "One More Hour" which was written by Wasner and Scott Harper.

Head of Roses track listing
No.	Title	Length
1.	"2 Heads"	3:01
2.	"Price of Blue"	6:22
3.	"Two"	3:38
4.	"Hard Way"	3:13
5.	"Walking"	3:47
6.	"Lightning"	4:15
7.	"One More Hour"	3:43
8.	"No Question"	4:08
9.	"Awake for the Sunrise"	3:58
10.	"Head of Roses"	4:35
Total length:		40:40

== Personnel ==
Credits are adapted from the LP notes.

=== Musicians ===
- Jenn Wasner – guitars, piano, synths, bass, electronics, drum programming, vocals
- Nick Sanborn – synths, electronics, bass
- Matt McCaughan – drums, percussion
- Meg Duffy – guitars, vocals
- Trever Hagan – trumpet
- Scott Harper – synths
- Andy Stack – cello
- Adam Schatz – saxophone
- Kris Hilbert – pedal steel

=== Technical and design ===
- Nick Sanborn – production, additional engineering
- Jenn Wasner – production
- Bella Blasko – engineering, mixing
- Ari Picker – mixing
- Huntley Miller – mastering
- Graham Tolbert – photography and artwork
- Dusty Summers – layout and design

== Charts ==
Chart performance for Head of Roses
Chart (2021)	Peak position
UK Record Store (OCC)	15

Chart performance for "Two"
Chart (2021)	Peak position
US Adult Alternative Airplay (Billboard)	39

== Head of Roses: Phantom Limb ==
Head of Roses: Phantom Limb

Compilation album by Flock of Dimes
- Released: April 15, 2022
- Studios: Sunfair (Joshua Tree, California); Betty's (Chapel Hill, North Carolina); Manifold (Pittsboro, North Carolina); Columns Hotel (New Orleans)
- Length: 58:10
- Label: Sub Pop
- Producers: Nick Sanborn; Jenn Wasner

Flock of Dimes chronology
Head of Roses (2021)	Head of Roses: Phantom Limb (2022)	The Life You Save (2025)

Singles from Head of Roses: Phantom Limb
- 1. "Through Me" Released: October 6, 2021; 2. "It Just Goes On" Released: March 23, 2022; 3. "Go with Good" Released: April 11, 2022

Head of Roses: Phantom Limb is a compilation album by Flock of Dimes, released on April 15, 2022 through Sub Pop Records.

With two unrelated original songs ("It Just Goes On" and "Through Me"), two covers, and two solo piano versions of songs from Flock of Dimes' EP Like So Much Desire (2020), the remainder of the compilation is derived from the track listing on Head of Roses, consisting of two outtakes, five live songs, and an acoustic demo.

Professional ratings
Review scores
Source	Rating
AllMusic	4/5 stars
Under the Radar	8/10

=== Track listing ===
All tracks are written by Jenn Wasner, except where noted.

Head of Roses: Phantom Limb track listing
No.	Title	Writer(s)	Length
1.	"It Just Goes On"		3:33
2.	"Go with Good"	Wasner; Scott Harper	4:27
3.	"Price of Blue" (Tiny Desk version)		6:03
4.	"Through Me"		3:59
5.	"Wonder"		3:20
6.	"Two" (live at Betty's)		3:28
7.	"Hard Way" (live at KEXP)		3:24
8.	"The Weakness in Me"	Joan Armatrading	3:42
9.	"Like So Much Desire" (solo piano)		3:31
10.	"One More Hour" (live at Betty's)	Wasner; Harper	4:14
11.	"Lightning" (acoustic demo)		4:02
12.	"Amelia"	Joni Mitchell	5:52
13.	"Awake for the Sunrise" (live at Betty's)		4:06
14.	"Spring in Water" (solo piano)		4:29
Total length:			58:10

=== Technical personnel ===
Credits are adapted from Tidal.

- Jenn Wasner – production (all tracks), engineering (1, 7, 12), mixing (7, 9, 12, 14)
- Nick Sanborn – production (all tracks), engineering and mixing (11)
- Ethan Gruska – production and engineering (1)
- Alli Rogers – engineering (1)
- Bella Blasko – engineering (2, 4–5), mixing (1, 4–5)
- Chris Boerner – engineering (3, 6, 8–10, 13–14), mixing (3, 6, 8, 10, 13)
- Aaron Roche – engineering (12)
- Ari Picker – mixing (2)
