= Dungeonesse =

- Genres: Pop, electronic, dance
- Years active: 2012–present
- Label: Secretly Canadian
- Members: Jenn Wasner; Jon Ehrens
- Website: http://www.secretlycanadian.com/artist.php?name=dungeonesse

Dungeonesse is an American collaboration between songwriter and producer Jon Ehrens (White Life, Art Department) and singer Jenn Wasner (Wye Oak, Flock of Dimes) out of Baltimore, Maryland. The project was born through their mutual love for Top 40 and R&B and the mechanics behind a hit song. The pair began creating songs long-distance between Los Angeles and wherever Wasner was touring. The group signed to the independent record label Secretly Canadian in 2012, and since have released one single, "Drive You Crazy" b/w "Private Party." Their self-titled debut album was released by Secretly Canadian on May 14, 2013.

According to Ehrens and Wasner, the music is equally focused on sonic choices and lyrics. The songs have been heavily influenced by the music of the 1990s, as both members of the duo call themselves "90's children."

== History ==
=== 2012: Secretly Canadian ===
Jon Ehrens and Jenn Wasner began collaborating on music remotely when Wasner was touring with another group. In late 2012, the duo signed to Secretly Canadian. They released their first single, "Drive You Crazy" b/w "Private Party" and announced their debut album's scheduled 2013 release.

=== 2013: Dungeonesse ===
In early 2013, Dungeonesse announced the official release date of their debut album, Dungeonesse, as May 14, and allowed fans to stream another single from the album: "Shucks." Later in the year, they shared another new track called "Nightlight." The album became available for pre-order in April. The duo also spent time in 2013 creating remixes for fellow artists, such as John Grant's "Black Belt" and Cayucas's "Cayucos."

== Discography ==
=== Singles ===
- "Drive You Crazy" b/w "Private Party" (2012), Secretly Canadian

=== Albums ===
- Dungeonesse (2013), Secretly Canadian
