= No Horizon =

EP by Wye Oak
- Released: July 31, 2020
- Studio: Overdub Lane (Durham, North Carolina); National Sawdust (Brooklyn, New York)
- Genre: Art pop
- Length: 20:07
- Label: Merge
- Producer: Wye Oak

Wye Oak chronology
| The Louder I Call, the Faster It Runs (2018) | No Horizon (2020) | Cut All the Wires: 2009–2011 (2021) |

Singles from No Horizon
- 1. "AEIOU" Released: July 7, 2020; 2. "No Place" Released: July 20, 2020; 3. "Spitting Image" Released: July 28, 2020

No Horizon is the third extended play by the American duo Wye Oak, released on July 31, 2020, through Merge Records. It prominently features the Brooklyn Youth Chorus, with whom the band had previously collaborated.

Described musically as art pop, lyrical themes include personal identity and isolation. The EP was preceded by three of its five tracks in the month before its release, and it received generally positive reviews by critics.

== Background and recording ==
No Horizon follows their album The Louder I Call, the Faster It Runs (2018) and a string of standalone singles from 2019. For member Jenn Wasner, it was her second record in two months, after the EP Like So Much Desire, which was surprise-released under her solo moniker, Flock of Dimes.

Wye Oak and the Brooklyn Youth Chorus had collaborated previously on William Brittelle's album Spiritual America (2019). According to Wasner, once they began to play the songs live, the chorus' director, Dianne Berkun Menaker, suggested that they should work together again in the future. The duo were then approached by Judd Greenstein who offered them a commission to compose music that would be performed with the chorus at the Ecstatic Music Festival. While residing in Durham, North Carolina, they wrote from late 2018 to early 2019 and subsequently performed at Merkin Hall in New York City for the festival later that year.

Consisting of the same compositions, No Horizon was recorded at Overdub Lane in Durham and at National Sawdust in Brooklyn, New York, with additional recording by Wye Oak. It is their third EP overall, after 2010's My Neighbor/My Creator and 2015's Shriek Remixes.

== Composition and title ==
No Horizon is a departure from Wye Oak's typical sound, largely due to the Brooklyn Youth Chorus' presence, while retaining the experimental quality for which that the group had become known. The five compositions that make up the EP were broadly described in Beats Per Minute as "synth-laden art-pop". For Wasner, the experience of writing lyrics for others was an unexpectedly arduous task; she said that had to learn how to "write music that was separate from my own personal perspective because so much music I've written has been emotionally linked to my experience or semi-autobiographical." Thematically, much of the record's lyrics deal with isolation and language, despite having been written before the COVID-19 pandemic. The title of the EP is implied to be a statement about people's individuality, using the Earth's horizon as a metaphor.

The opener "AEIOU" is about the power that particular words wield. Wasner said that it was written at a time when the U.S. government was reportedly planning to remove certain mentions of the word "transgender". Introduced by synthesizers, percussion, and a guitar strumming, the chorus repeatedly chant the vowels from the title. As the music continues to form structurally, Wasner's vocals are introduced over a minute into the song. The music continues to crescendo and the chorus begin to chant the title again. Wasner goes on to suggest that language is quite limiting in how it labels people.

Subsequent track "No Place" is dominated by percussion, keyboards, and minor chord progressions, with the chorus now taking the lead over Wasner who echoes their lines in spoken word. The song is one of the more philosophical on the EP, discussing matters of one's own identity and existence. After "Spitting Image", on which Wasner urges the listener to use "understanding as a weapon", and the short instrumental piece "(clouds)", the EP closes with the six-minute composition "Sky Witness". Led by Wasner's vocals, the song frequently changes in its structure and tempo, often making of use of repetition. At its conclusion, the chorus repeats the line "Cloud / Moon / See me."

== Singles and release ==
On July 7, 2020, less than a month before the EP's eventual release, Wye Oak announced No Horizon, leading it with the song "AEIOU" and an accompanying lyric video. Two more singles were released in the interim: "No Place" on July 20 and "Spitting Image" on July 28. On July 31, just three days later, the EP was released on Merge Records, made physically available on 12-inch pink vinyl inside a transparent plastic sleeve.

== Critical reception ==
Professional ratings
Aggregate scores
| Source | Rating |
|---|---|
| Metacritic | 75/100 |
Review scores
| Source | Rating |
| Beats Per Minute | 74% |
| Exclaim! | 7/10 |
| Pitchfork | 7.4/10 |
| PopMatters | 7/10 |
| Spectrum Culture | 75% |
| Under the Radar | 7/10 |

According to the review aggregator Metacritic, No Horizon received "generally favorable reviews" based on a weighted average score of 75 out of 100 from 5 critic scores.

Emma Bauchner, writing for Beats Per Minute, thought that the Brooklyn Youth Chorus "complement the synth-heavy instrumentals beautifully", and that in light the COVID-19 pandemic, the chorus was well-suited for "Wasner's reflections on communication and isolation, which feel particularly relevant and profound in our present moment." In a 7 out of 10 review for PopMatters, Steve Horowitz said that the chorus' "voices lend a structured beauty to the seeming disorder of the material", and opined that while the EP has its highlights, "it is the entire package, the mix of sounds and language that captivates."

Ashley Hampson of Exclaim! said that the EP's sense of experimentation push Wye Oak's skills ever forward", highlighting "No Place" as the stand-out track. Bob Fish of Spectrum Culture also singled out "No Place", saying that its existential subject matter "speaks volumes about the band." They concluded their review by stating that with the aid of the chorus, they were "able to successfully meld the classical and the contemporary."

Rating No Horizon 7 out of 10 for Under the Radar, Mark Moody thought the EP was at its best when the chorus was fully integrated into the music like on "AEIOU" and "Spitting Images", rather than when Wasner or the chorus take the lead over each other on "No Place" and "Sky Witness". Evan Rytlewski of Pitchfork praised the chorus' vocal arrangements as the record's driving force, but added that "For all its wow factor, No Horizon has less replay value than most Wye Oak releases", saying that their choice to release an EP rather than a full-length album was the better option.

== Track listing ==
All tracks are written by Wye Oak.

No Horizon track listing
| No. | Title | Length |
|---|---|---|
| 1. | "AEIOU" | 4:57 |
| 2. | "No Place" | 3:39 |
| 3. | "Spitting Image" | 4:25 |
| 4. | "(cloud)" | 1:05 |
| 5. | "Sky Witness" | 6:01 |
| Total length: | | 20:07 |

== Personnel ==
Credits are adapted from the LP notes, except where noted.

=== Wye Oak ===
- Jenn Wasner – vocals, guitars, bass
- Andy Stack – drums, keyboards, backing vocals

=== Brooklyn Youth Chorus ===
- Dianne Berkun Menaker – artistic director
- Sasha Abner
- Maya Baijal
- Maya Barth
- Nora Beer
- Trilliane Bergeron
- Julia Berman
- Kaitlyn Bovell
- Jeanne Bransbourg
- Maya Chatterjee
- Leah Clifford
- Cora Clum
- Mekaeli Cox
- Senlee Dieme
- Hannah Fear
- Elana Field
- Sofia Galperin
- Isabella Gastel Alejandre
- Isabel Gilabert
- Erynn Gutierrez
- Aemilia Harbutt
- Lila Hasenstab
- Penelope Keane
- Stevie Kim-Rubell
- Taylor Lashley
- Max Levine
- Abigail Lienhard
- Harmonie Lirenman
- Madison Loughlin
- Bianca Martinez
- Joanna McCabe
- Quyn McCaffrey
- Lyric Miller-Chin
- Ella Ondrick
- Sierra Principal
- Cecelia Rivkin-Brennan
- Reaiah Roberts
- Margot Saganich
- Maya Sequira
- Sonia Sergeant
- Tatyana Sgaraglino
- Josie Shehadi
- Anna Shepherd
- Naia Shepherd
- Anna Vartsaba
- Aliyah Weiss
- Bebe Yaffe

=== Technical ===
- Wye Oak – production, additional recording
- Ari Picker – mixing at Goth Construction Studio
- Sarah Register – mastering
- Missy Thangs, Alli Rogers – recording at Overdub Lane (Durham, North Carolina)
- Sascha Von Oertzen – recording at National Sawdust (Brooklyn, New York)
