= Dungeonesse (album) =

Studio album by Dungeonesse
- Released: May 14, 2013
- Genre: Dance-pop; R&B
- Length: 34:56
- Label: Secretly Canadian
- Producer: Jon Ehrens

Singles from Dungeonesse
- 1. "Drive You Crazy" b/w "Private Party" Released: December 4, 2012; 2. "Shucks" Released: February 6, 2013; 3. "Nightlight" Released: April 10, 2013

Dungeonesse is the debut studio album by the American duo Dungeonesse, consisting of producer Jon Ehrens (Art Department, White Life) and vocalist Jenn Wasner (Wye Oak). It was released on May 14, 2013, by the record label Secretly Canadian and was preceded by the singles "Drive You Crazy", "Shucks", and "Nightlight". Described as dance-pop and R&B, the album was met with generally positive reviews upon release. It features TT the Artist on "This Could Be Home" and DDm on "Cadillac".

== Promotion and singles ==
Three singles preceded Dungeonesse. On December 4, 2012, the duo released the 12-inch single "Drive You Crazy", with "Private Party" as its B-side. On February 6 the following year, they announced their self-titled album, revealing its artwork and track listing. The announcement was accompanied by "Shucks" as the second single. Then, on April 10, the third single "Nightlight" was released, later followed by a corresponding Ariana Natale-directed music video in June.

== Critical reception ==
Professional ratings
Aggregate scores
| Source | Rating |
|---|---|
| AnyDecentMusic? | 6.7/10 |
| Metacritic | 70/100 |
Review scores
| Source | Rating |
| The A.V. Club | B+ |
| AllMusic | 4/5 stars |
| Consequence | C− |
| DIY | 3/5 stars |
| The Line of Best Fit | 7.5/10 |
| NME | 3.5/5 stars |
| Pitchfork | 7.7/10 |
| PopMatters | 4/10 |
| Slant | 4.5/5 stars |
| Under the Radar | 6/10 |

According to the review aggregator Metacritic, Dungeonesse received "generally favorable reviews" based on a weighted average score of 70 out of 100 from 14 critic scores. Another aggregator, AnyDecentMusic?, gave the album an average of 6.7 out of 10 based on a different sample of 14 critical reviews.

== Track listing ==
All tracks are written by Jon Ehrens and Jenn Wasner.

Dungeonesse track listing
| No. | Title | Length |
|---|---|---|
| 1. | "Shucks" | 3:34 |
| 2. | "Drive You Crazy" | 3:07 |
| 3. | "Show You" | 2:29 |
| 4. | "Private Party" | 4:16 |
| 5. | "Nightlight" | 3:23 |
| 6. | "This Could Be Home" (feat. TT the Artist) | 3:28 |
| 7. | "Wake Me Up" | 4:00 |
| 8. | "Cadillac" (feat. DDm) | 3:26 |
| 9. | "Anywhere You Are" | 3:28 |
| 10. | "Soon" | 3:42 |
| Total length: | | 34:56 |

== Personnel ==
Credits are adapted from the CD liner notes.

=== Dungeonesse ===
- Jon Ehrens – production
- Jenn Wasner – vocals

=== Additional contributors ===
- TT the Artist – featured artist on "This Could Be Hone"
- DDm – featured artist on "Cadillac"
- Matt Beckley – additional production
- Juliette Amoroso – mixing assistance
- Jeff Lipton – mastering at Peerless Mastering, Boston, Massachusetts
- Maria Rice – mastering assistance
- Rose MF Chase – art, design
