= Shriek (album) =

Studio album by Wye Oak
- Released: April 29, 2014
- Studio: Rare Book Room (Brooklyn, New York)
- Length: 41:34
- Label: Merge (US); City Slang (EU)
- Producer: Nicolas Vernhes

Wye Oak chronology
Civilian (2011)	Shriek (2014)	Tween (2016)

Singles from Shriek
- 1. "The Tower" Released: January 30, 2014; 2. "Glory" Released: March 18, 2014

Professional ratings
Aggregate scores
Source	Rating
Metacritic	76/100
Review scores
Source	Rating
AllMusic	4/5 stars
The A.V. Club	A−
Consequence of Sound	C+
Drowned in Sound	7/10
The Line of Best Fit	8.5/10
MusicOMH	4.5/5 stars
NME	4/5 stars
Pitchfork	7.2/10
Rolling Stone	3.5/5 stars
Spin	7/10

Shriek is the fourth studio album by indie band Wye Oak. It was released on April 29, 2014, by Merge Records in the United States and City Slang in Europe.

The album peaked at number 67 on the US Billboard 200.

== Production ==
The album was produced by French producer Nicolas Vernhes at the Rare Book Room Studios in Brooklyn.

== Release ==
On January 30, 2014, Wye Oak announced the release of their fourth studio album, along with the single, "The Tower".

=== Singles ===
The first single from the album, "The Tower" was released on January 30, 2014. The single has been described as a "pretty melancholy track with Jenn Wasner’s smoky but downtrodden voice and the dark, pulsating synths." In a review of the single, Chad Jewett of Half Cloth explained that it "offers a dub-like mélange of skittering drums and keyboard slabs. A rusted cello creaks in the background, dappling the already slightly ominous minor key burner with rustic gloom." Andy Stack, who has routinely pulled double-duty on drums and keyboard, offers a choppy back-and-fourth[sic] between the two, treating the song’s whorling organ with percussive menace, till it’s almost part of the kit.

The second single "Glory" was released on March 18, 2014. Jamieson Cox from Pitchfork said the single "is nervy, charged music, buzzing like a brain in heat." While explaining Wasner had a "palpable uptick" in her voice and in the stickiness of its rhythmic hook." Kyle McGovern from Spin explained the single has a "high-minded groove that benefits from Wasner’s heavenly vocals and a brief detour into itchy, electronic instrumentation."

=== Music videos ===
The official music video for "The Tower" was released on April 3, 2014, and directed by American filmmaker Ben O'Brien. The video features two dancing painters pirouetting through city streets and warehouses.

On April 30, 2014, the music video for "Glory" was released, and directed by Michael Patrick O'Leary and Ashley North Compton. The video has been described as "bizarre", as it features everyday items turning into "creepy pieces of symbolism". Director Ashley North Compton explained the reason behind the "cryptic visuals": "The video explores an internal and external power struggle and a fear of loss of control—through the lens of youth, anxiety, ease, and tension. The narrative follows youth-oriented themes, colors, styles and struggles with jarring and uncomfortable characters and movements."

== Critical reception ==
Shriek was met with "generally favorable" reviews from critics. At Metacritic, which assigns a weighted average rating out of 100 to reviews from mainstream publications, this release received an average score of 76 based on 24 reviews.

Tim Sendra of AllMusic said: "The album is built around swooning banks of synths, bleeping key-based melodies, Stack's choppy drum patterns and programs, and Wasner's bouncy basslines." While also noting, the vocals of Jenn Wasner are her "most powerful and varied yet". Jon Hadusek said their album "feels like a natural progression for Wasner and Stack, with the synths handling the same rhythms and higher register melodies once reserved for the guitars. Shriek is a successful reinvention and hopefully a prelude of things to come as the band embarks on its new life."

=== Accolades ===
Accolades for Shriek
Publication	Accolade	Rank
MusicOMH	MusicOMH's Top 100 Albums of 2014	70
Stereogum	Stereogum's Top 50 Albums of 2014	4
Stereogum	Stereogum's Top 50 Albums of 2014 – Mid-Year	21
Under the Radar	Under the Radar's Top 140 Albums of 2014	9

== Shriek: Variations ==
On February 20, 2024, the band announced that for the album's tenth anniversary, they would release Shriek: Variations, which includes five of its songs – "Before", the title track, "Sick Talk", "The Tower", and "Logic of Color" – reworked by American electroacoustic composer William Brittelle and included with the original Shriek. The band had previously worked with Brittelle on his 2019 album Spiritual America. On the new project, Stack said in a press release that "It's like looking at the songs in a funhouse mirror. The songs on Shriek can be stripped down or embellished – this is maximal embellishment. William took the album and blew it to smithereens, looking at it in a weird, prismatic way." Shriek: Variations was released on March 22 by Merge Records.

== Track listing ==
All tracks are written by Jenn Wasner

Shriek track listing
No.	Title	Length
1.	"Before"	4:19
2.	"Shriek"	3:39
3.	"The Tower"	4:06
4.	"Glory"	4:53
5.	"Sick Talk"	4:25
6.	"Schools of Eyes"	4:14
7.	"Despicable Animal"	4:50
8.	"Paradise"	4:21
9.	"I Know the Law"	3:44
10.	"Logic of Color"	2:59
Total length:		41:34

iTunes deluxe version
No.	Title	Length
11.	"Glory" (DJ Keith Sweaty remix)	5:38
12.	"Sick Talk" (Matmos remix)	4:31
13.	"Shriek" (DJ Daylight remix)	2:32
14.	"Despicable Animal" (Moss of Aura / Future Islands remix)	4:57
15.	"The Tower" (Drew Swinbourne remix)	4:20

Shriek: Variations bonus tracks
No.	Title	Length
11.	"Before" (Variation)	6:17
12.	"Shriek" (Variation)	3:53
13.	"Sick Talk" (Variation)	6:28
14.	"The Tower" (Variation)	6:05
15.	"Logic of Color" (Variation)	4:47

== Personnel ==
- Jenn Wasner – vocals, bass, keyboards, programming, production, engineering
- Andy Stack – drums, keyboards, upright bass, programming, guitar, production, engineering
- Nicolas Vernhes – engineering, mixing, production
- Joe Lambert – mastering
- Gabe Wax – engineering assistance
- Ashley North Compton – cover layout

== Charts ==
Chart performance for Shriek
Chart (2014)	Peak position
US Billboard 200	67
US Top Rock Albums (Billboard)	21
US Top Alternative Albums (Billboard)	12
US Independent Albums (Billboard)	17
US Indie Store Album Sales (Billboard)	13
