= The Louder I Call, the Faster It Runs =

Studio album by Wye Oak
- Released: April 6, 2018
- Length: 36:28
- Language: English
- Label: Merge (US)

Wye Oak chronology
| Tween (2016) | The Louder I Call, the Faster It Runs (2018) | No Horizon (2020) |

The Louder I Call, the Faster It Runs is the sixth studio album by indie band Wye Oak. It was released digitally on April 6, 2018 by Merge Records in the United States.

== Music videos ==
On the day of the album's release, Wye Oak debuted the music video for the album title track "The Louder I Call, The Faster it Runs". The video was filmed by Dan Huiting, edited by Daniel Murphy, and included styling by Dear Hearts. The music video features Wasner and Stack wandering White Sands National Monument in New Mexico with various editing techniques to make it appear Wasner and Stack have mirages of themselves following them.

A second video directed by Dan Huiting was launched on May 9, 2018 for the track "It Was Not Natural". The music video features Wasner singing in a house and forest alongside faceless dancing figures.

== Critical reception ==
Professional ratings
Aggregate scores
| Source | Rating |
|---|---|
| AnyDecentMusic? | 7.7/10 |
| Metacritic | 80/100 |
Review scores
| Source | Rating |
| The A.V. Club | B |
| AllMusic | 4/5 stars |
| Drowned in Sound | 9/10 |
| Exclaim! | 7/10 |
| MusicOMH | 4/5 stars |
| Paste | 7.8/10 |
| Pitchfork | 8/10 |
| The Skinny | 5/5 stars |
| Spill Magazine | 3.5/5 stars |
| Under the Radar | 7.5/10 |

The Louder I Call, the Faster It Runs received positive reviews from critics. The album has been praised for its unique combination of dream pop and strong beats. In contrast to previous albums, Wasner was noted as evoking the stylings of Björk in the orchestral track "My Signal". NPR wrote: "This is the sound of a band shedding uncertainties and forging an audacious creative path."

== Track listing ==
| No. | Title | Length |
|---|---|---|
| 1. | "(tuning)" | 0:37 |
| 2. | "The Instrument" | 3:21 |
| 3. | "The Louder I Call, the Faster It Runs" | 4:23 |
| 4. | "Lifer" | 3:32 |
| 5. | "It Was Not Natural" | 4:05 |
| 6. | "Symmetry" | 4:06 |
| 7. | "My Signal" | 1:36 |
| 8. | "Say Hello" | 3:44 |
| 9. | "Over and Over" | 2:54 |
| 10. | "You of All People" | 3:55 |
| 11. | "Join" | 2:55 |
| 12. | "I Know It's Real" | 3:20 |
| Total length: | | 36:28 |

== Personnel ==
Credits adapted from Tidal.

- Jenn Wasner – vocals, guitar, bass, keyboards, piano, programming, production, engineering
- Andy Stack – drums, guitar, bass, upright bass, keyboards, piano, programming, production, engineering
- Greg Calbi – mastering
- Steve Fallone – mastering
- John Congleton – mixing
- Brandon Eggleston – engineering
- Daniel Murphy – cover design and layout
- Misha Capecchi – photography
