= Tween (album) =

Studio album by Wye Oak
- Released: June 9, 2016
- Length: 34:28
- Labels: Merge (US); City Slang (EU)

Wye Oak chronology
Shriek (2014)	Tween (2016)	The Louder I Call, the Faster It Runs (2018)

Professional ratings
Review scores
Source	Rating
The A.V. Club	A−
Paste	6.8/10
Pitchfork	8.0/10
PopMatters	7/10
Under the Radar	7/10

Tween is the fifth studio album by indie band Wye Oak. It was released digitally on June 9, 2016 by Merge Records in the United States. The physical album was officially released on August 5, 2016.

Tween is unique in that all the songs were "written, scrapped, and re-purposed" by Wye Oak in between the years 2011 and 2014. Therefore, the tracks for the album are all remnants from their past albums Civilian and Shriek.

== Track listing ==
No.	Title	Length
1.	"Out of Nowhere"	3:02
2.	"If You Should See"	4:07
3.	"No Dreaming"	5:28
4.	"Too Right"	5:36
5.	"Better (For Esther)"	5:25
6.	"On Luxury"	4:37
7.	"Trigger Finger"	3:52
8.	"Watching the Waiting"	3:01
Total length:		34:28

== Music videos ==
On the day of the album's release, Wye Oak debuted the music video for "Watching the Waiting". The video was directed by Michael Patrick O’Leary and Ashley North Compton, and features Wasner and Stack wearing mirrors and masks, alongside various backgrounds of deserts, forest, and water.

== Personnel ==
Credits adapted from Tidal.

- Jenn Wasner – vocals, guitar, bass, keyboards, programming, production
- Andy Stack – drums, bass, guitar, keyboards, saxophone, programming, vocals, production
- Chris Freeland – engineering
- Hugo Nicolson – mixing
- Jeff Lipton – mastering
- Maria Rice – mastering assistance
- Ashley North Compton – artwork
