= If Children =

Studio album by Wye Oak
- Released: 2007
- Recorded: Winter of 2006
- Length: 41:41
- Label: Self-released

Wye Oak chronology
If Children (2007)	The Knot (2009)

If Children is the debut studio album by Baltimore-based band Wye Oak, originally self-released in 2007 under the band name Monarch, then re-released on April 8, 2008 by Merge Records.

== Critical reception ==
Professional ratings
Review scores
Source	Rating
AllMusic	3.5/5 stars
American Songwriter	3/5 stars
Robert Christgau	(2-star Honorable Mention)
Exclaim!	(favorable)
The Line of Best Fit	81/100
Pitchfork	7.1/10
Prefix	7/10
Seven Days	(favorable)

Writing for Pitchfork, Mike Powell gave If Children a 7.1 out of 10 rating, saying that the album "displays a band that knows how to vary a theme just enough to keep momentum." Robert Christgau gave it a 2-star honorable mention rating, which corresponds to a "likable effort consumers attuned to its overriding aesthetic or individual vision may well enjoy," and said of the album that it was "Poised warily between innocence and experience, d/b/a melody and chaos."

== Track listing ==
No.	Title	Length
1.	"Please Concrete"	3:13
2.	"Warning"	3:48
3.	"Regret"	2:25
4.	"Archaic Smile"	5:04
5.	"Family Glue"	4:15
6.	"Orchard Fair"	3:45
7.	"I Don't Feel Young"	3:01
8.	"Keeping Company"	3:52
9.	"A Lawn to Mow"	3:10
10.	"If Children Were Wishes"	5:28
11.	"Obituary"	3:40
Total length:		41:41

== Personnel ==
- Jenn Wasner – instrumentation, vocals
- Andy Stack – engineering
- Eric Morrison – mixing
- John Golden – mastering
