= Teasley =

Teasley is a surname. Notable people with the surname include:

- Brian Teasley, American musician
- Jerome Teasley (1948–2016), American soul drummer
- Lisa Teasley (born 1964), American writer and artist
- Nikki Teasley (born 1979), American basketball player
- Nolan Teasley (born 1984), American football executive
- Ron Teasley (1927–2026), American baseball player
- Sam Teasley (born 1976), American politician

== Fictional characters ==
- Yvonne Teasley, a character in Beverly Hills, 90210, played by Denise Dowse
