= The Knot (album) =

2009 album from Wye Oak

Studio album by Wye Oak
- Released: July 21, 2009
- Length: 44:33
- Label: Merge

Wye Oak chronology
If Children (2008)	The Knot (2009)	My Neighbor/My Creator (2010)

Professional ratings
Aggregate scores
Source	Rating
Metacritic	75/100
Review scores
Source	Rating
The A.V. Club	A−
AllMusic	3/5 stars
Consequence of Sound	B
Pitchfork	5.9/10
PopMatters	8/10

The Knot is the second studio album by indie band Wye Oak. It was released by Merge Records in the US on July 21, 2009.

== Track listing ==
All tracks are written by Andy Stack and Jenn Wasner.

No.	Title	Length
1.	"Milk and Honey"	1:59
2.	"For Prayer"	3:50
3.	"Take It In"	5:50
4.	"Siamese"	4:10
5.	"Talking About Money"	3:14
6.	"Mary Is Mary"	7:36
7.	"Tattoo"	4:07
8.	"I Want for Nothing"	4:22
9.	"That I Do"	3:51
10.	"Sight, Flight"	5:34
Total length:		44:33

== Personnel ==
- Andy Stack
- Jenn Wasner
