= Andy Stack =

Andy Stack may refer to:

- Andy Stack, pen name used by writer Ann Rule
- Andy Stack (musician)
