= The Life You Save =

Studio album by Flock of Dimes
- Released: October 10, 2025
- Studio: Betty's (Chapel Hill, North Carolina); Montrose (Los Angeles)
- Genre: Folk
- Length: 50:20
- Label: Sub Pop
- Producer: Jenn Wasner

Flock of Dimes chronology
Head of Roses: Phantom Limb (2022)	The Life You Save (2025)

Singles from The Life You Save
- 1. "Long After Midnight" Released: July 23, 2025; 2. "Afraid" Released: August 20, 2025; 3. "Defeat" Released: September 17, 2025

The Life You Save is the third studio album by the American singer-songwriter Jenn Wasner under the pseudonym Flock of Dimes, released on October 10, 2025 through Sub Pop Records. It was self-produced with additional production from Nick Sanborn.

== Promotion and singles ==
Upon the album's announcement on July 23, 2025, the lead single "Long After Midnight" was released with a music video directed by Spencer Kelly in which Wasner plays an acoustic guitar on a floor while people gradually remove all objects in her surroundings. On August 20, the second single, "Afraid" was released with another video directed by Kelly. Then, a third single, "Defeat", was revealed on September 17. The song, which had written roughly three years prior, was accompanied by a video directed by Sabrina Nichols with editing by Kelly.

== Critical reception ==
Professional ratings
Aggregate scores
Source	Rating
Metacritic	82/100
Review scores
Source	Rating
AllMusic	4/5 stars
Classic Rock Italia	7/10 stars
Mojo	4/5 stars
Paste	7.3/10
Pitchfork	7.8/10
Spectrum Culture	75%
Uncut	8/10

According to the review aggregator Metacritic, The Life You Save received "universal acclaim" based on a weighted average score of 82 out of 100 from 5 critic scores.

In Uncut magazine, Piers Martin said that "Wasner is clear-eyed and unflinching on third album The Life You Save about her ongoing 'struggle within the cycles of addiction and codependency'", praising her in an 8 out of 10 review for approaching the subject with an "effortless warmth". Andrew Ha of Paste similarly cited a "warmth" to the record and called Wasner's "clarion voice ... both tender and resolute, revealing vulnerability while holding herself—and others—to a new standard." In a four star review for Mojo magazine, Martin Aston lauded the album's coupling of "gorgeous melodies" and Wasner's "glowing vibrato", comparing her vocal performance to that of "a young Lucinda Williams" and stating that The Life You Save was at its best on the track "Not Yet Free". Laura Snapes thought that the "bold choice" in taking a more acoustic and folk-inclined approach was "fitting" given the record's intimate subject matter. Snapes further commented that it felt "safe, not in the sense of risk-aversion, but in the way Wasner creates a tender space in which to dismantle what had seemed so sure" in her life.

=== Year-end lists ===
Publication	List	Rank	Ref.
AllMusic	Favorite Singer/Songwriter Albums	N/A	
Under the Radar	Top 100 Albums of 2025	39	

== Track listing ==
All tracks are written by Jenn Wasner.

The Life You Save track listing
No.	Title	Length
1.	"Afraid"	3:41
2.	"Keep Me in the Dark"	4:27
3.	"Long After Midnight"	2:51
4.	"Defeat"	4:18
5.	"Close to Home"	4:39
6.	"The Enemy"	3:21
7.	"Not Yet Free"	4:17
8.	"Pride"	4:57
9.	"Theo"	3:46
10.	"Instead of Calling"	3:49
11.	"River in My Arms"	5:21
12.	"I Think I'm God"	4:53
Total length:		50:20

== Personnel ==
Credits are adapted from the vinyl liner notes.

=== Musicians ===
- Jenn Wasner – vocals, acoustic and electric guitars, bass, synthesizers, electronics
- Alan Good Parker – bass, acoustic, electric, tenor, pedal steel, and lap steel guitars, mandolin, cello
- Jacob Ungerleider – piano, synthesizers, pump organ, tenor guitar
- Matt McCaughan – drums and electronics
- TJ Maiani – drums
- Nick Sanborn – synthesizer and modular processing
- Adam Schatz – saxophone and electronics
- Meg Duffy – acoustic and sustainer guitars
- Adrian Olsen – modular processing

=== Technical and design ===
- Jenn Wasner – production
- Nick Sanborn – production (4), additional production (2–3, 5, 7–8, 11)
- Adrian Olsen – additional production (5–6, 11–12), engineering, mixing
- Alli Rogers – engineering
- Huntley Miller – mastering
- Graham Tolbert – photography
- Sabrina Nichols – handwriting
- Dusty Summers – art direction and design

== Charts ==
Chart performance for The Life You Save
Chart (2025)	Peak position
UK Album Downloads (OCC)	100
