= If You See Me, Say Yes =

Studio album by Flock of Dimes
- Released: September 23, 2016
- Genre: Experimental pop; indie pop; synth-pop
- Length: 43:17
- Label: Partisan (US)
- Producer: Jenn Wasner; Mickey Freeland

Flock of Dimes chronology
If You See Me, Say Yes (2016)	Like So Much Desire (2020)

If You See Me, Say Yes is the debut album by the Baltimore-based artist, Flock of Dimes, also known as Jenn Wasner of the indie band Wye Oak. The album was released on September 15, 2016 by Partisan Records.

== Music videos ==
Roughly two months before the album's release, a music video was released for the single track, "Semaphore". The video was produced by Michael Patrick O’Leary and Ashley North Compton, and features Wasner wearing white and black makeup whilst interacting with various animations of shapes and colors.

== Critical reception ==
Professional ratings
Aggregate scores
Source	Rating
Metacritic	83/100
Review scores
Source	Rating
AllMusic	4/5 stars
Drowned in Sound	8/10
The Line of Best Fit	8/10
Pitchfork	7.0/10
The Skinny	4/5 stars
Uncut	4/5 stars
Under the Radar	8/10 stars

At Metacritic, which assigns a normalised rating out of 100 to reviews from mainstream critics, If You See Me, Say Yes has an average score of 83, based on nine reviews, which indicates "universal acclaim". Joe Goggins of The Skinny considered the album to be a compelling "grab-bag of Wasner's myriad off-kilter pop influences," adding that the largely electronic palette "[suits] her down to the ground" and noting that the meld of the singer's vocal melodies and musicianship "allows her the sort of flexibility you need to be able to pull off this kind of experimental pop record, and the vision, too". Timothy Monger of AllMusic wrote that the album was a personal but warm and inviting effort which consolidates on Flock of Dimes' earlier "atmospheric bedroom pop singles", praising the luscious harmonies, trickling synths and "clever rhythmic ships". Uncut compared Wasner to Joni Mitchell due to her inspired chord changes, melodies, sophisticated language and smooth vocals.

Writing for Drowned in Sound, Sam Cleeve praised the album for matching synthetic and processed instrumentation with Wasner's warm voice and "knack for melody", also describing the record as a "kind of synth-pop". James Appleyard of The Line of Best Fit emphasised how Wasner forwent the folk music of Wye Oak for a mature, synth-heavy sound which "showcases a solid knack for crafting rousing, erudite pop music", and praised the musician for "fully [embracing] her pop sensibilities, even if at times, this gets the better of her." Pitchfork reviewer Evan Wytlewski described the album as the "most all-encompassing document of [Wasner's] tastes yet, incorporating dreamy indie rock and digital pop." Although they felt that the "tension and menace" of Wye Oak was missing, the record's contented nature was "a fair tradeoff". Scott Dransfield, writing for Under the Radar, considered the album to be a "refined work of indie-pop beauty ready for road trips or daily life".

== Track listing ==
No.	Title	Length
1.	"Sometimes It Is Right..."	0:21
2.	"Birthplace"	4:12
3.	"The Joke"	3:12
4.	"Everything Is Happening Today"	4:00
5.	"Semaphore"	3:48
6.	"Ida Glow"	4:05
7.	"Flight"	5:35
8.	"Apparition"	4:29
9.	"Given/Electric Life"	3:17
10.	"Minor Justice"	3:29
11.	"You, The Vatican"	4:20
12.	"...To Have No Answer"	3:49
Total length:		43:17

== Personnel ==
- Jenn Wasner – vocals, guitar, bass, keyboard
- Aaron Roche – guitar, bass, piano, voices, trombone, trumpet, drums
- Andy Stack – saxophone
- Ryan Seaton – saxophone and drums
- Susan Alcorn – pedal steel
