= Civilian (Wye Oak album) =

Studio album by Wye Oak
- Released: March 8, 2011
- Genre: Indie rock
- Length: 38:46
- Labels: Merge; City Slang
- Producers: John Congleton; Wye Oak

Wye Oak chronology
My Neighbor/My Creator (2010)	Civilian (2011)	Shriek (2014)

Civilian is the third studio album by indie band Wye Oak. It was released on March 8, 2011, by Merge Records in the United States and City Slang in Europe.

The A.V. Club named Civilian the best album of 2011.

== Release ==
On February 27, 2011, Wye Oak announced the release of their new album, along with the title track.

=== Music video ===
The music video for "Fish" was released on April 8, 2011.

On September 2, 2011, Wye Oak released the music video for "Holy Holy". It was directed by Jeremy Johnstone and produced by Greg Beauchamp.

=== 10th Anniversary Reissue ===
On October 22, 2021, to mark the 10th anniversary of the album, Merge released Civilian + Cut All the Wires 2009–2011. In addition to the original Civilian album, a second disc containing 12 demos and outtakes from the album's sessions was included.

== In popular culture ==
An edited version of the title track of Civilian was featured in the 2011 trailer for the second season of The Walking Dead and also the closing scene of the second-season episode "18 Miles Out" (2012). "Civilian" was also featured in the final scene of the 13th episode of the North American remake of Being Human (2011), in the episode "The Man Who Sailed Around His Soul" of One Tree Hill (2011), in the episode "Thy Will Be Done" of Underbelly: Badness (2012), in the ending scene of the Animal Kingdom third-season episode "Prey", and in the final scene of the Longmire season 4 finale "What Happens on the Rez..." (2015), as well in the films Safety Not Guaranteed (2012) and The Odd Way Home (2013).

== Critical reception ==
Professional ratings
Aggregate scores
Source	Rating
AnyDecentMusic?	7.7/10
Metacritic	81/100
Review scores
Source	Rating
AllMusic	4/5 stars
The A.V. Club	A
The Boston Phoenix	3.5/4 stars
Consequence of Sound	3.5/5 stars
Mojo	4/5 stars
Pitchfork	7.9/10
PopMatters	7/10
Q	4/5 stars
Spin	8/10
Uncut	4/5 stars

Civilian was met with "universal acclaim" reviews from critics. At Metacritic, which assigns a weighted average rating out of 100 to reviews from mainstream publications, this release received an average score of 81 based on 20 reviews.

Tim Sendra of AllMusic said: "The albums sounds brighter and better recorded, Wasner's songs are crisper and more memorable with an extra amount of sadness added, the performances invested with a level of intensity and fiery soul that had only been hinted at before."

=== Accolades ===
Accolades for Civilian
Publication	Accolade	Rank
The A.V. Club	The A.V. Club's Top 26 Albums of 2011	1
Magnet	Magnet's Top 20 Albums of 2011	8
Paste	Paste's Top 50 Albums of 2011	18
Pazz & Jop	Pazz & Jop's Top Albums of 2011	40
PopMatters	PopMatters' Top 75 Albums of 2011	50
PopMatters	PopMatters' Top 10 Indie Rock Albums of 2011	9
Stereogum	Stereogum's Top 100 Albums of the Decade (2010s)	95
Treble	Treble's Top 50 Albums of 2011	17

== Track listing ==
All tracks are written by Jenn Wasner.

Civilian track listing
No.	Title	Length
1.	"Two Small Deaths"	3:50
2.	"The Alter"	3:42
3.	"Holy Holy"	4:35
4.	"Dogs Eyes"	3:24
5.	"Civilian"	3:40
6.	"Fish"	4:49
7.	"Plains"	3:45
8.	"Hot as Day"	3:50
9.	"We Were Wealth"	4:38
10.	"Doubt"	2:27
Total length:		38:40

Cut All the Wires: 2009–2011 track listing
No.	Title	Length
1.	"Replacement"	2:22
2.	"Civilian" (demo)	3:04
3.	"No Words"	4:37
4.	"Electricity"	4:34
5.	"Half a Double Man"	3:59
6.	"Sinking Ship"	3:24
7.	"Two Small Deaths" (Daytrotter session)	2:46
8.	"Holy Holy" (demo)	3:58
9.	"Pardon"	3:34
10.	"Black Is the Color"	2:53
11.	"Ten Fingers"	2:52
12.	"I'm Proud"	4:00
Total length:		42:03

== Personnel ==
Credits adapted from Tidal.

- Jenn Wasner – vocals, guitar, bass, keyboards, percussion, production
- Andy Stack – drums, bass, guitar, keys, percussion, production, engineering
- Alan Douches – mastering
- John Congleton – mixing
- Chris Freeland – engineering
- Mickey Freeland – engineering
- Michael Patrick O'Leary – cover photo
- Cady Bean-Smith – cover design

== Charts ==
Chart performance for Civilian
Chart (2011)	Peak position
US Billboard 200	137
US Heatseekers Albums (Billboard)	1
US Independent Albums (Billboard)	22
US Top Rock Albums (Billboard)	32
US Top Alternative Albums (Billboard)	16
