= Harriet (band) =

American band

- Origin: Los Angeles, California, U.S.
- Genres: Alternative rock
- Years active: 2011–2017
- Labels: Harvest Records
- Members: Alex Casnoff; Henry Kwapis; Patrick Kelly; Matt Blitzer
- Past members: Aaron Harrison Folb; Sean O'Brien; Adam Gunther
- Website: harrietmusic.com

Harriet was an American band from Los Angeles, California, fronted by songwriter and keyboard player Alex Casnoff, with Henry Kwapis on drums, Patrick Kelly on electric bass, and Matt Blitzer on guitar.

== History ==
The band was formed in 2011 when Alex Casnoff left Dawes in order to pursue his own music. The band then consisted of Casnoff, Henry Kwapis, and Aaron Harrison Folb.

The trio was joined by guitar player and engineer Sean O'Brien to record their first EP Tell The Right Story at The Hangar recording studio in Sacramento, California. O'Brien was unable to permanently join the band, but recommended fellow guitarist Adam Gunther, who ended up joining them for live shows in support of the EP, as well as for the video shoot of the single from the EP entitled "I Slept With All Your Mothers." Folb and Gunther were eventually replaced by Kelly and Blitzer later in 2012.

The band was later signed with Harvest Records, recorded and released a second self-titled EP, and released videos for the songs "Irish Margaritas," "Burbank," "Up Against It," and "Ten Steps." In 2016, the band released their debut album American Appetite with Harvest Records, featuring songs from their previous EP.

The band broke up in 2017.

== Discography ==
=== Albums ===
- American Appetite (2016)

=== Singles ===
- "American Appetite" (2015)
- "Irish Margaritas" (2016)
- "Burbank" (2016)
- "Up Against It" (2016)
- "Ten Steps" (2016)
- "Inheritance" (2016)

== Band members ==
- Matt Blitzer – guitar
- Alex Casnoff – vocals, keyboards
- Aaron Harrison Folb – bass guitar, synth bass
- Adam Gunther – guitar
- Henry Kwapis – drums
- Patrick Kelly – bass
- Sean O'Brien – guitar, engineer
