= Jenn Wasner =

American singer-songwriter (born 1986)

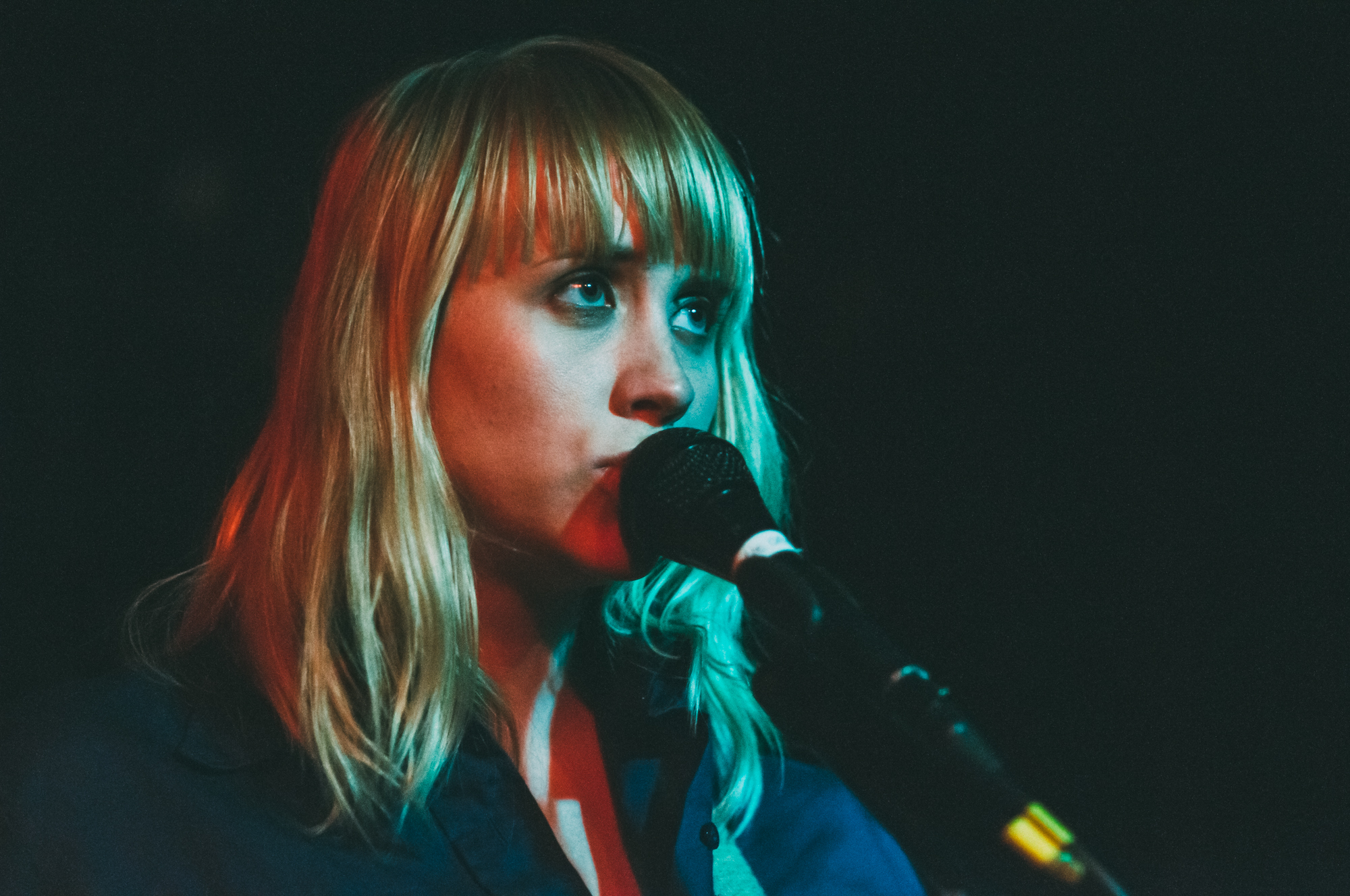

Background information
- Also known as: Flock of Dimes
- Born: Jennifer Lynn Wasner; April 16, 1986 (age 40); Baltimore, Maryland, United States
- Genres: Indie rock; electronic; synthpop
- Occupations: Singer-songwriter, musician
- Instruments: Vocals; guitar; bass; keyboards
- Years active: 2003–present
- Labels: Merge; Partisan; Sub Pop
- Member of: Wye Oak; Dungeonesse; Bon Iver

Jennifer Lynn Wasner (born April 16, 1986) is an American musician from Baltimore. Wasner is best known as one of the founding members of the band Wye Oak, along with Andy Stack. Wasner has completed numerous other music projects as well, including a solo project entitled Flock of Dimes, and a collaboration called Dungeonesse with Jon Ehrens of White Life and Art Department.

== Early life ==
Wasner was born on April 16, 1986, in Baltimore. She began singing at an early age with her mother and started taking classical piano lessons at about the age of five. At the age of twelve her mother taught her how to play guitar, which led to the beginning of her songwriting career. Throughout her childhood, her parents struggled with mental illness, addiction, and financial troubles. By high school, Wasner had met Andy Stack, and begun playing music with him. She continued to write music while away at college.

== Music career ==
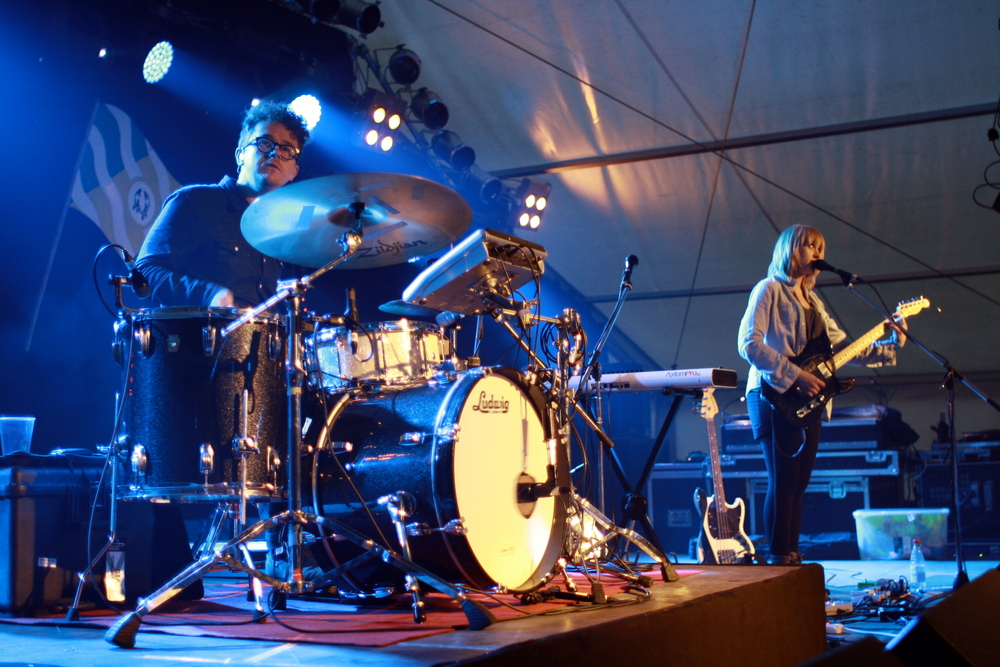
Wasner performing in Wye Oak.

After college Wasner moved to the Hampden neighborhood of Baltimore. She and Stack formed a band with the name Monarch, which was soon changed to Wye Oak after the state tree of Maryland. After the release of their highly regarded album Civilian in 2011, the group toured in the United States and Europe. Civilian was named the best album of 2011 by The A.V. Club and was featured on television in the popular series The Walking Dead and in the film Safety Not Guaranteed. She also appeared on Titus Andronicus's 2010 album The Monitor, lending her vocals to the track "To Old Friends and New".

After touring with Dirty Projectors, Wasner began work on her solo project Flock of Dimes, which experimented with electronic beats and synthesizers. She worked with Jon Ehrens of the Baltimore pop group White Life on a new project, Dungeonesse, which released its eponymous album in 2013. Wasner moved from Baltimore to Durham, North Carolina and continues to reside there.

Stack and Wasner reunited to create the fifth major album Shriek, released in April 2014. The band released its sixth studio album, The Louder I Call, the Faster It Runs, in 2018, and a compilation of singles, Every Day Like the Last, in 2023.

Wasner has released three albums, If You See Me, Say Yes in 2016, Head of Roses in 2021, and The Life You Save in 2025, under her solo project Flock of Dimes. North Carolina-based guitar maker Reverend released a Jenn Wasner signature guitar in 2016 to accompany the first Flock of Dimes album. Wasner has supported Sylvan Esso on tour as Flock of Dimes. In 2016, Wasner was featured in a concert series taking place at the Baltimore–Washington International Airport, where she performed at the baggage claim area of the terminal.

In 2019, Wasner joined Bon Iver as a guitarist. The tour was delayed due to the COVID-19 pandemic but eventually resumed. She continues to perform with the band and is featured in track "Day One" on its 2025 album Sable, Fable.

Wasner produced Madeline Kenney's 2023 sophomore album A New Reality Mind.

== Discography ==
Flock of Dimes discography
- Studio albums: 3
- EPs: 1
- Compilation albums: 1
- Singles: 16

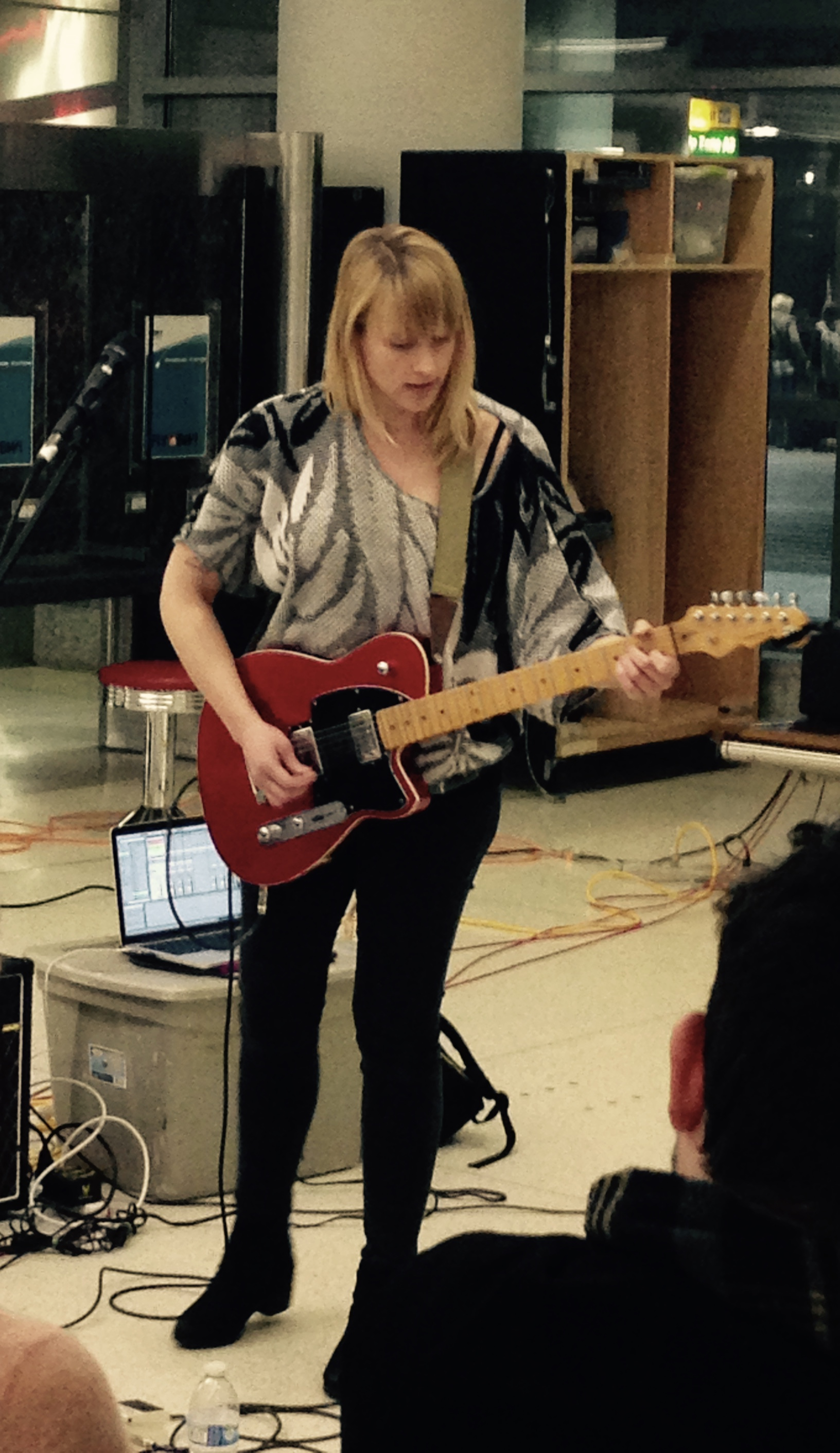
Wasner performing as Flock of Dimes at BWI Airport in February 2016

=== As Flock of Dimes ===
==== Studio albums ====
- If You See Me, Say Yes (2016, Partisan Records)
- Head of Roses (2021, Sub Pop)
- The Life You Save (2025, Sub Pop)

==== Extended plays ====
- Like So Much Desire (2020, Sub Pop)

==== Compilation albums ====
- Head of Roses: Phantom Limb (2022, Sub Pop)

==== Singles ====
| Title | Year | Peak chart positions | Album |
| Title | Year | US AAA | Album |
|---|---|---|---|
| "Curtain" b/w "Apparition" | 2012 | — | Non-album singles |
| "Prison Bride" | 2012 | — | Non-album singles |
| "(This Is Why) I Can't Wear White" / "15" | 2012 | — | Non-album singles |
| "Semaphore" | 2016 | — | If You See Me, Say Yes |
| "Everything Is Happening Today" | 2016 | — | If You See Me, Say Yes |
| "Don't Dream It's Over" / "Everything Is Free" (featuring Sylvan Esso) | 2016 | — | Non-album single |
| "Two" | 2021 | 39 | Head of Roses |
| "Price of Blue" | 2021 | — | Head of Roses |
| "Hard Way" | 2021 | — | Head of Roses |
| "One More Hour" | 2021 | — | Head of Roses |
| "Through Me" | 2021 | — | Head of Roses: Phantom Limb |
| "It Just Goes On" | 2022 | — | Head of Roses: Phantom Limb |
| "Go with Good" | 2022 | — | Head of Roses: Phantom Limb |
| "Long After Midnight" | 2025 | — | The Life You Save |
| "Afraid" | 2025 | — | The Life You Save |
| "Defeat" | 2025 | — | The Life You Save |
"—" denotes singles that did not chart or were not released in that territory.

=== With Wye Oak ===
- If Children (2007, self-released; 2008, Merge Records)
- The Knot (2009, Merge)
- Civilian (2011, Merge)
- Shriek (2014, Merge)
- Tween (2016, Merge)
- The Louder I Call, the Faster It Runs (2018, Merge)

=== With Dungeonesse ===
- Dungeonesse (2013, Secretly Canadian)
