= Chip Hooper (American agent) =

American talent agent

Chip Hooper (March 15, 1962 – March 5, 2016) was a music industry agent, personally representing Phish and the Dave Matthews Band, and heading the Paradigm Talent Agency. Hooper was born in Miami, FL, but grew up in Glen Ellyn, Il. Hooper attended college at Southwest Missouri State University. He broke into the music industry initially booking the club scene in Chicago. He became associated with the Minneapolis-based Good Music Agency before hiring into the Carmel, California-based Monterey Peninsula Artists as an agent in 1988. He ascended to the head of the Paradigm Talent Agency after Paradigm acquired Monterey in 2005. Hooper was instrumental in promoting the Jam Band movement, through his agency with Phish and other seminal acts. Hooper was also an accomplished photographer, with books (including California's Pacific and New Zealand's South Pacific and Tasman Sea) and gallery showings to his name.
