= Jerome Teasley =

American drummer (1948–2016)

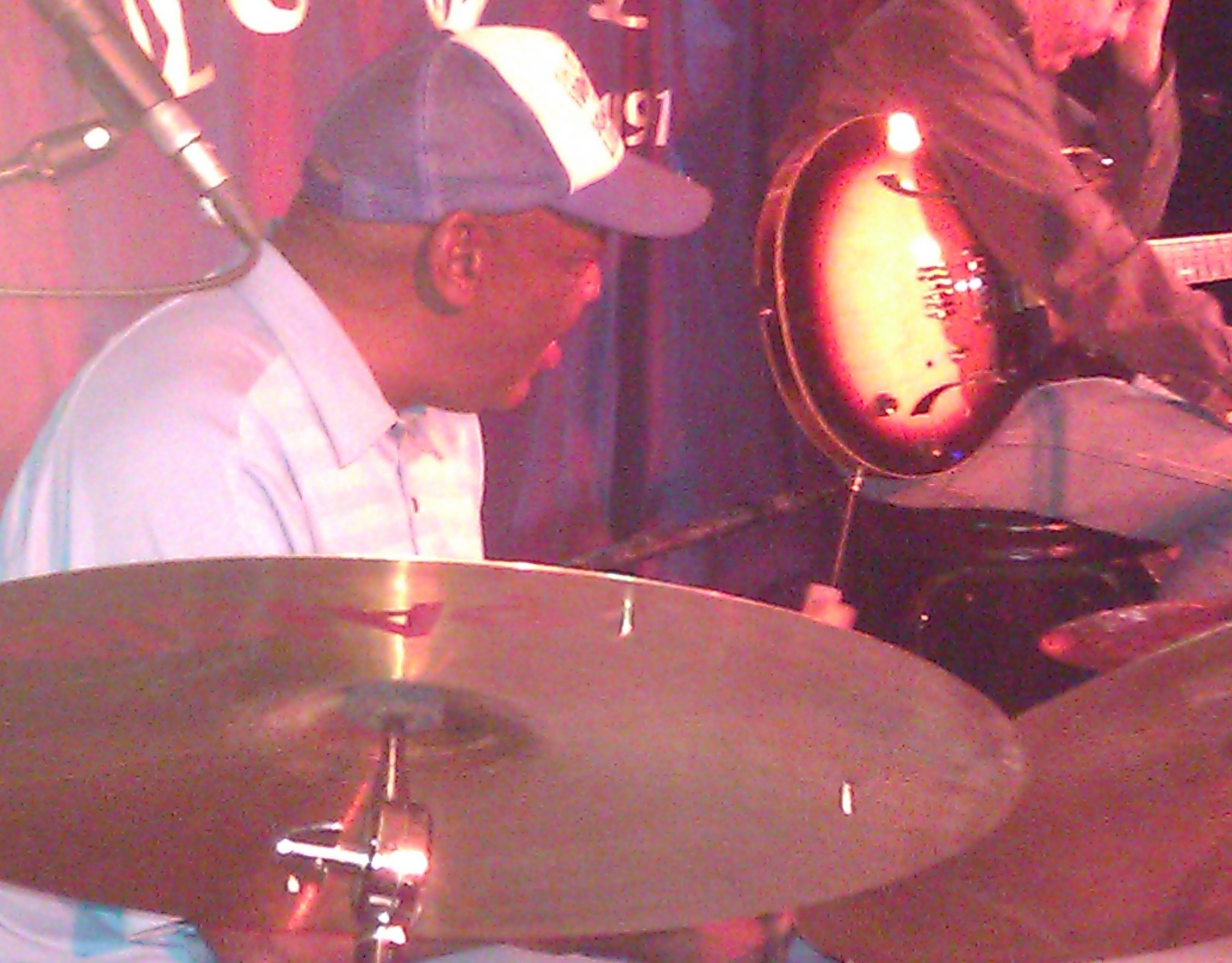
- Jerome Teasley on Drums

Background information
- Born: August 13, 1948
- Origin: Detroit, Michigan, United States
- Died: June 16, 2016 (aged 67) Phoenix, Arizona, United States
- Genres: Soul
- Occupation: musician
- Instrument: Drum set
- Years active: 1963–2016

Jerome Teasley (August 13, 1948 – June 16, 2016) was an American soul drummer and member of the Motown Hall of Fame. He toured extensively with Junior Walker and the All Stars, and also worked with Al Green, Jimi Hendrix, Wilson Pickett, Tina Turner, Bill Carr, and jazz saxophonist Sonny Stitt among many others.

Teasley died on June 16, 2016, in a hospital in Phoenix, Arizona, from complications of lung and liver cancer, aged 67.

== Discography ==
- Junior Walker – "Peace & Understanding Is Hard To Find" (STML11234)
- Junior Walker – "Whiskey a Go Go Live" (STML1127)
- Junior Walker – "Home Cooking" (STML/TML11097)
- Al Green – "Back Up Train" (Arista B0009VNBMY)
- Sonny Stitt – "Tornado" (JM1003, JMLP-1003)
