= White Life =

American pop group

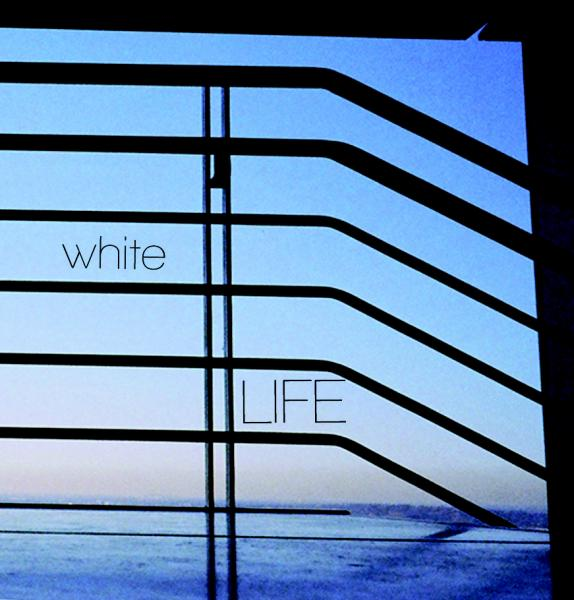
White Life May 2011

White Life is a pop group out of Baltimore, Maryland. Created by Jonathan Ehrens and featured vocals from his sister, Emily Ehrens. The self-titled, debut album was released in 2011 on Ehse Records, an independent Baltimore record label. The album's production credits include Chris Freeland of OXES, Jenn Wasner of Wye Oak and White Life's own Jonathan Ehrens. White life expanded into a full band for live performances and included Dave Fell of Adventure, Andrew Bernstein of Dan Deacon Ensemble and Grayson Brown. White Life has been described as a "throwback synth pop group" or a "retro pop group".
