= Wye Oak (band) =

American indie rock band

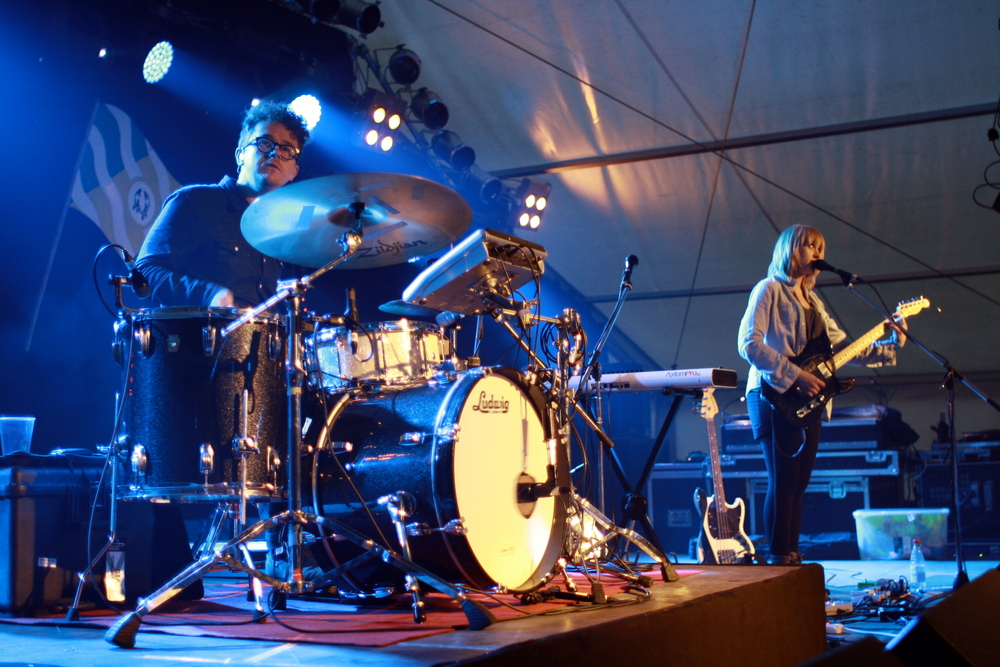
- Wye Oak in 2014

Background information
- Also known as: Monarch
- Origin: Baltimore, Maryland
- Genres: Indie rock; indie folk; dream pop
- Years active: 2006–present
- Labels: Merge, City Slang
- Members: Andy Stack; Jenn Wasner
- Website: www.wyeoakmusic.com

Wye Oak is an American indie rock duo from Baltimore composed of Andy Stack (drums, keyboards, backup vocals) and Jenn Wasner (vocals, guitars and bass). Their sound has been described as "earnest folk-influenced indie rock with touches of noise and dream pop" as well as indie folk. Wasner sings lead vocals and plays electric or acoustic guitar, while Stack plays both drums and keyboards, playing the drums with his feet and right hand, and the bass line with his left hand.

== History ==
The band was formed as Monarch in mid-2006, before changing their name to Wye Oak, a reference to the former state tree of their home state of Maryland. They released their first album, If Children, independently in 2007 and subsequently signed to Merge Records in 2008. The label re-released If Children that year; a second album, The Knot, followed in 2009. Both albums were recorded at the recording studio at University of Maryland Baltimore County, where Stack was a student, with The Knot submitted as Stack's senior project.

Their third album, Civilian, was released in March 2011 by Merge in the US and City Slang in Europe. The title track was featured in The Walking Dead during the tenth episode of season 2, titled "18 Miles Out", and also in Safety Not Guaranteed.

They followed with Shriek in April 2014. In 2016, they released Tween, consisting of leftover material recorded between Civilian and Shriek.

On April 6, 2018, their next full-length album, The Louder I Call, the Faster It Runs, was released. For their The Louder I Call, the Faster It Runs tour during the spring of 2018, Wye Oak added bassist William Joseph Hackney to the live line-up.

== Discography ==
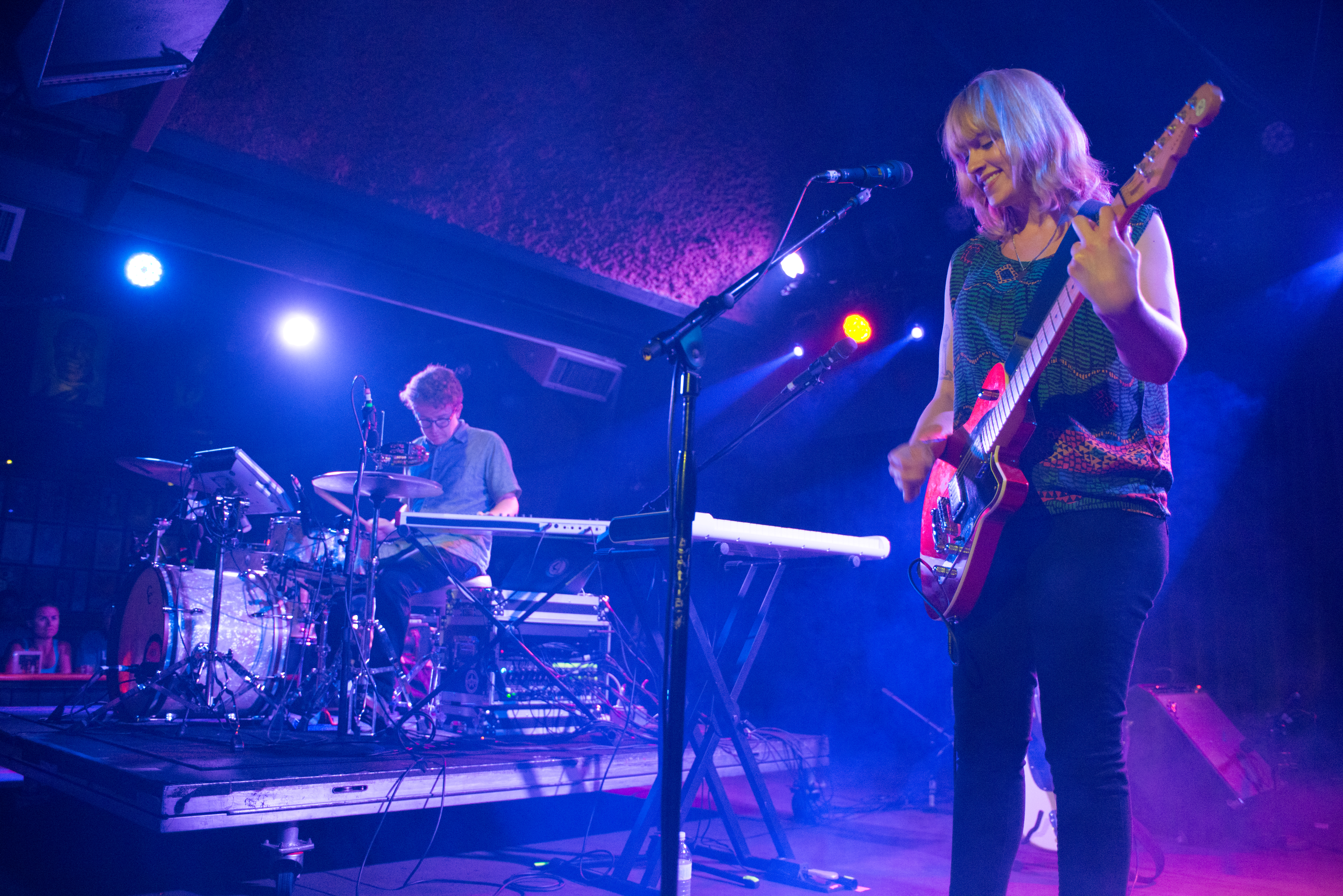
Wye Oak at the Belly Up in Solana Beach, California.

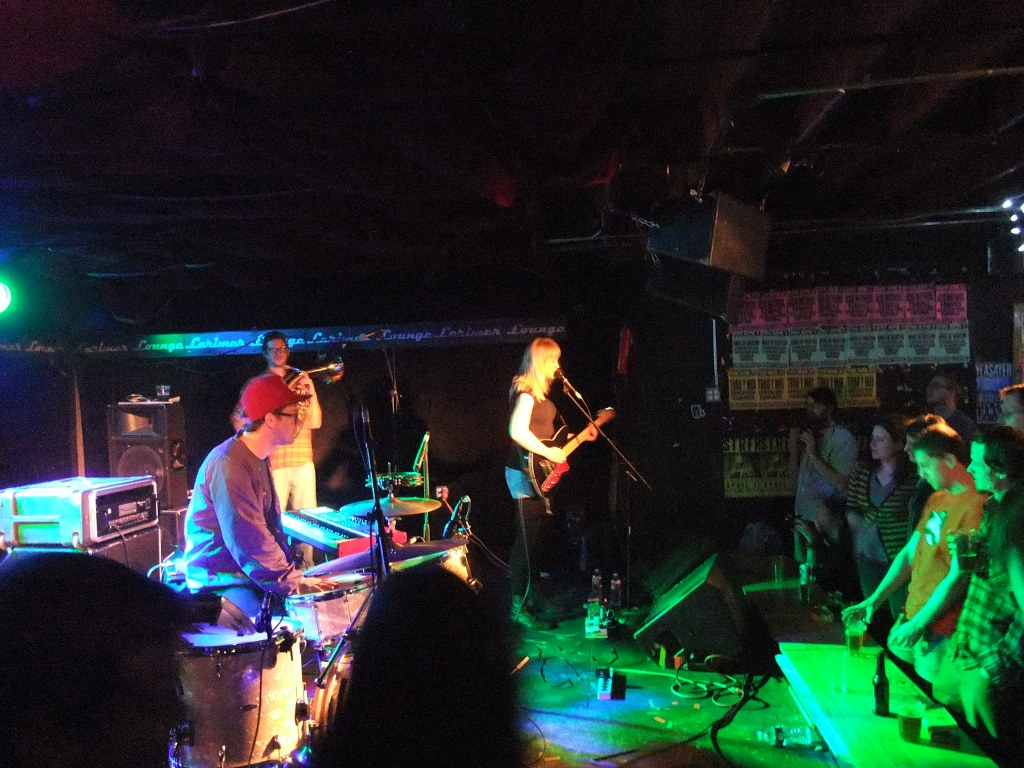
Wye Oak at Larimer Lounge in Denver, Colorado.

=== Studio albums ===
- If Children (2007, self-released; 2008, Merge)
- The Knot (2009, Merge)
- Civilian (2011, Merge)
- Shriek (2014, Merge)
- Tween (2016, Merge)
- The Louder I Call, the Faster It Runs (2018, Merge)

=== Extended plays ===
- My Neighbor/My Creator (2010, Merge)
- Shriek Remixes (2015, Merge)
- No Horizon (2020, Merge)

=== Compilation albums ===
- Cut All the Wires: 2009–2011 (2021, Merge)
- Every Day Like the Last (2023, Merge)

=== Singles and EPs ===
- "Destroyer/Wye Oak" split 7-inch single with Destroyer (2008, Merge)
- "Holy Holy" (2011, City Slang)
- "The Alter" (2011, City Slang)
- "Strangers" 7-inch single (2011, Merge)
- "Spiral" digital single (2012, Adult Swim Singles Program 2012)
- "Shriek" (2014, City Slang)
- "Trigger Finger" 7-inch single (2015, Joyful Noise)
- "Wave Is Not the Water" (2017, Merge)
- "The Louder I Call, The Faster It Runs" (2018, Merge)
- "Fortune" (2019, Merge)
- "Fear of Heights" (2020, Merge)
- "Walk Soft" (2020, Merge)
- "TNT" (2021, Merge)
- "Its Way with Me" (2021, Merge)
- "Every Day Like the Last" (2023, Merge)

=== Music videos ===
- "It Was Not Natural" (2018)
- "The Louder I Call, the Faster It Runs" (2018)
- "Watching the Waiting" (2016)
- "Glory" (2014)
- "The Tower" (2014)
- "Holy, Holy" (2011)
