= Andy Stack (musician) =

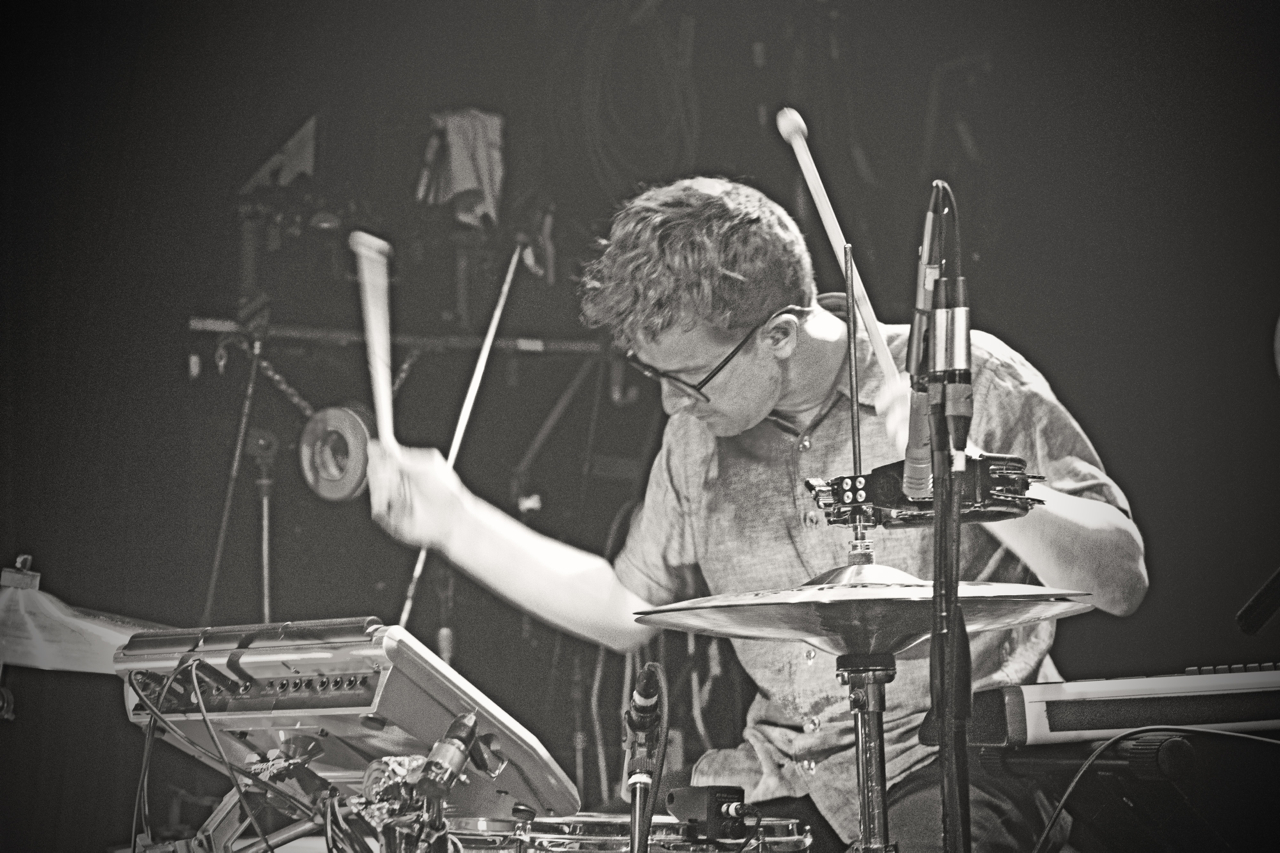
- Stack performing in 2016

Background information
- Birth name: Andrew Brant Stack
- Born: Baltimore, Maryland, United States
- Instrument(s): Drums, Bass, Guitar, Keyboards, Saxophone, Upright Bass, Electronics, Voice, Steel Drum
- Years active: 2006-present
- Labels: Merge Records, City Slang
- Website: Wye Oak web site, Joyero web site

Andrew Brant "Andy" Stack is one of the founding members of the indie-rock duo Wye Oak and a solo artist under the moniker Joyero, as well as a remix artist and a composer and producer for film and commercial music. He has also performed as a member of EL VY, and Lambchop.

== Early life ==
Stack was born and raised outside of Baltimore, Maryland. He studied music at Berklee College of Music in Boston, Massachusetts, where he originally focused on bass guitar and upright bass, and later at University of Maryland, Baltimore County.

== Music career ==
Stack and Jenn Wasner formed Wye Oak as a recording duo in 2006, but Stack had played in bands with Wasner before that, dating back to when they met as high school classmates. To date, the band has released six studio albums and several EPs, and has toured extensively in North America, Europe, Asia and Australia, including performances at Coachella, Lollapalooza, and a TV performance on Late Night with Jimmy Fallon. Wye Oak's album Civilian was named the best album of 2011 by The A.V. Club, and was featured on television in the popular series The Walking Dead and in the film Safety Not Guaranteed.

Stack's debut solo record as Joyero, "Release The Dogs" was released in August 2019 via Merge Records, with accompanying tours in the United States and Europe.

Stack has remixed tracks for Sylvan Esso, T. Rex, and others, and has appeared on recordings by Lambchop, Madeline Kenney, Helado Negro, and Shearwater.

In addition to performing, Stack composes music for film, television and commercials.

== Personal life ==
Stack currently lives in Durham, NC.
