= List of Bennington College people =

This list of notable people associated with Bennington College includes matriculating students, alumni, attendees, faculty, trustees, and honorary degree recipients of Bennington College in Bennington, Vermont.

== Notable alumni ==
=== Architecture ===
Name	Class year	Notability	Degree	Reference
Judith Munk	1946	artist and designer associated with Scripps Institution of Oceanography	B.A.	

=== Art administration ===
Name	Class year	Notability	Degree	Reference
Deborah Borda	1971	president and CEO, the Los Angeles Philharmonic; former president and CEO of the New York Philharmonic	B.A.	
Dan Cameron	1979	former director, visual arts, Contemporary Arts Center (New Orleans), chief curator of the Orange County Museum of Art	B.A.	
Kathy Halbreich	1971	associate director, the Museum of Modern Art (New York)	B.A.	
Maren Hassinger	1969	director, the Rinehart School of Graduate Sculpture at the Maryland Institute College of Art	B.A.	
Lindsay Howard	2008	art curator in New York	B.A.	
Harvey Lichtenstein	1953	chair, Brooklyn Academy of Music (BAM) Local Development Corporation; former executive director and president emeritus of the board of trustees, Brooklyn Academy of Music	B.A.	
Matthew Marks	1985	founder and owner, Matthew Marks Gallery	B.A.	
Sharon Ott	1972	former artistic director, Seattle Repertory Theater; Tony and Obie Awards; faculty, Savannah College of Art & Design; executive board member, Stage Directors and Choreographers Society	B.A.	
Virlana Tkacz	1974	founding director of Yara Arts Group	B.A.	
Anne Waldman	1966	director and co-founder, Jack Kerouac School, the Naropa Institute; Dylan Thomas Memorial Prize and NEA fellowships	B.A.	

=== Aviation ===
Name	Class year	Notability	Degree	Reference
Betty Haas Pfister	1942	member of the Women Airforce Service Pilots during World War II, two-time winner of the All Women’s International Air Race	aviator	B.A.

=== Business ===
Name	Class year	Notability	Degree	Reference
Bruce Berman	1974	chairman and CEO, Village Roadshow Pictures; executive producer, The Matrix, Ocean's Eleven, Analyze This, Mystic River, Charlie and the Chocolate Factory	B.A.	
Deborah Borda	1971	president and CEO, the Los Angeles Philharmonic; former president and CEO of the New York Philharmonic	B.A.	
Ashley Gjøvik	2005	former Apple Inc. employee; labor activist and whistleblower		
Judith Jones	1945	vice president and senior editor, Knopf; author of The Tenth Muse: My Life with Food and The Pleasures of Cooking for One	B.A.	

=== Dance/choreography ===
Name	Class year	Notability	Degree	Reference
Ulysses Dove	1970	choreographer and dancer, created works performed by Alvin Ailey American Dance Theater and the New York City Ballet	B.A.	
Liz Lerman	1969	choreographer, founder/director, Liz Lerman Dance Exchange; 2002 MacArthur "Genius" Award winner	B.A.	
Lisa Nelson	1971	choreographer; former editor, Contact Quarterly; director of Videoda	B.A.	
Sara Rudner	1999	director of dance, Sarah Lawrence College; former principal dancer, Twyla Tharp Dance; recipient of Bessie Award and Guggenheim grant	B.A.	
Laura Spector	1976	former dancer; vine artist		

=== Education ===
Name	Class year	Notability	Degree	Reference
Judith Butler	1978	professor and chair of comparative literature and rhetoric, University of California, Berkeley; author, Gender Trouble	B.A.	
Sheila Miyoshi Jager	1984	professor of East Asian Studies at Oberlin College	B.A.	
Ellen McCulloch-Lovell	1969	president, Marlboro College; former deputy assistant to President Clinton	B.A.	
Sally Liberman Smith	1950	founder/director, Lab School, Washington, DC	B.A.	

=== Film/theater/television ===
Name	Class year	Notability	Degree	Citation
Betty Aberlin	1963	actress and poet, Mister Rogers′ Neighborhood	B.A.	
Alan Arkin	1955	actor, director, composer, author; film credits include Catch-22, The Russians Are Coming, Glengarry Glen Ross, Grosse Pointe Blank, The In-Laws, Little Miss Sunshine (Golden Globe and Academy Award for Best Supporting Actor), Get Smart	B.A.	
John Billingsley	1982	film and television actor with multiple credits, known for his role as Doctor Phlox on the television series Star Trek: Enterprise	B.A.	
Chris Bowen	1988	senior performing director, Blue Man Group; Obie and Drama Desk Awards	B.A.	
John Boyd	2003	actor, Bones, FBI	B.A.	
Carol Channing	1942	Broadway and film actress; Gentlemen Prefer Blondes and Hello, Dolly!; Golden Globe Award, Academy Award nomination	B.A.	
Spencer Cox		HIV/AIDS activist	B.A.	
Tim Daly	1979	actor, Diner, Made in Heaven; TV credits include Witness to the Execution, Wings, The Fugitive, The Sopranos, Private Practice, Madam Secretary; Theatre World and Dramalogue awards	B.A.	
Peter Dinklage	1991	actor; film credits include Living in Oblivion, The Station Agent, Elf, Death at a Funeral, Saint John of Las Vegas, The Chronicles of Narnia: Prince Caspian, X-Men: Days of Future Past; TV credits include Nip/Tuck, 30 Rock, Game of Thrones	B.A.	
Camelia Frieberg		Canadian film director and producer	B.A.	
Mitchell Kriegman	1974	Emmy award winning director and writer, The Book of Pooh, Bear in the Big Blue House, Clarissa Explains It All	B.A.	
Mitch Markowitz	1975	screenwriter, Good Morning Vietnam, Crazy People; TV credits include M*A*S*H, Too Close for Comfort, Monk	B.A.	
Alley Mills	1973	The Wonder Years, The Bold and the Beautiful (Emmy and Golden Globe Award)	B.A.	
Barry Primus	1960	actor/director/writer, Cagney & Lacey, The X-Files, LA Law; film credits include The Rose, American Hustle, Mistress, Cannibal Women in the Avocado Jungle of Death	B.A.	
Anne Ramsey	1951	actress, The Goonies, Throw Momma from the Train (Academy Award nomination, Golden Globe Award nomination, two Saturn Awards)	B.A.	
Melissa Rosenberg	1986	writer/producer; TV credits include The Agency, Boston Public, Dexter; film credits include Step Up, Twilight, New Moon	B.A.	
Suzanne Shepherd	1956	actress; film credits include Working Girl, Goodfellas; TV credits include Law & Order, The Sopranos	B.A.	
Jonathan Marc Sherman	1990	playwright/actor; plays written include: Women and Wallace, Things We Want, and the musical The Connector	B.A	
Treva Silverman	1959	TV writer, The Mary Tyler Moore Show, Room 222, The Monkees, Captain Nice	B.A.	
Rider Strong	2009	screenwriter, director, producer: Irish Twins; actor, Boy Meets World	M.F.A.	
Holland Taylor	1964	actress; film credits include To Die For, The Truman Show, One Fine Day; TV credits include Bosom Buddies, The Practice (Emmy Award), Two and a Half Men	B.A.	
Justin Theroux	1993	actor, Charlie's Angels: Full Throttle, Duplex, Mulholland Drive, American Psycho, Tropic of Thunder: Rain of Madness; TV credits include Alias, Sex and the City, Six Feet Under, The Leftovers, John Adams	B.A.	
Virlana Tkacz	1974	theater director	B.A.	
Jill Wisoff	1977	film composer/actor; film credits include Welcome to the Dollhouse, Smart House, Creating Karma	B.A.	

=== Government/public service ===
Name	Class year	Notability	Degree	Citation
Will Greer	2024	representative in the Vermont House of Representatives; high bailiff of Bennington County	B.A.	
Princess Yasmin Aga Khan	1973	vice chairman of Alzheimer's and Related Disorders Association; president of Alzheimer's Disease International	B.A.	
Emily Stonington		member of the Montana House of Representatives and Montana Senate	B.A.	
Ujwal Thapa	2000	political activist, and co-founder of grassroots political party Bibeksheel Nepali	B.A.	

=== Journalism/broadcasting ===
Name	Class year	Notability	Degree	Citation
James Geary	1985	former deputy editor of TIME magazine, Europe, Middle East, and Africa	B.A.	
Roger Kimball	1975	art critic and conservative social commentator; editor and publisher of New Criterion	B.A.	
Ted Mooney	1973	senior editor, Art in America magazine	B.A.	
Wendy Perron	1969	editor-in-chief, Dance Magazine	B.A.	
Alec Wilkinson	1974	staff writer, The New Yorker; author of eight nonfiction books; Robert F. Kennedy Book Award	B.A.	

=== Music ===
Name	Class year	Notability	Degree	Citation
Chris Barron	1990	lead singer, Spin Doctors	B.A.	
Alex Bleeker	2008	member of the band Real Estate and Alex Bleeker and the Freaks	B.A.	
Mountain Man		indie folk singing trio consisting of Molly Sarlé, Alexandra Sauser-Monnig, and Amelia Meath		
Lisa Sokolov	1976	jazz vocalist, improviser and composer; originator, Embodied VoiceWork; director, the Institute for Embodied VoiceWork in New York; associate professor, NYU's Tisch School of the Arts	B.A.	
Michael Starobin	1979	orchestrator on Broadway for Sunday in the Park with George, Assassins, Falsettos, Guys and Dolls, King Lear, Visiting Mr. Green, Next to Normal	B.A.	
Will Stratton	2009	singer/songwriter	B.A.	
Elizabeth Swados	1973	composer, writer, director; three-time Obie winner	B.A.	
James Tenney	1958	experimental composer; Roy E. Disney Family Chair in Musical Composition, CalArts	B.A.	
Joan Tower	1961	composer; Asher Edelman Professor of Music, Bard College; Grammy Award recipient	B.A.	
Susannah Waters	1986	soprano, profiled in Opera News; NYC Opera debut 1997 in Handel's Xerxes	B.A.	
Anthony Wilson	1990	composer/arranger, guitarist; toured with Diana Krall	B.A.	

=== Science/medicine ===
Name	Class year	Notability	Degree	Citation
Barrie Cassileth	1959	Laurance S. Rockefeller Chair in Integrative Medicine, Memorial Sloan-Kettering Cancer Center	B.A.	
Joan Hinton	1942	nuclear physicist, China activist	B.A.	
Jennifer Mieres	1982	director, nuclear cardiology; associate professor, New York University School of Medicine	B.A.	

=== Sports ===
Name	Class year	Notability	Degree	Citation
Martha Rockwell	1966	Olympic cross-country skier	B.A.	

=== Visual arts ===
Name	Class year	Notability	Degree	Citation
Ralph Alswang	1987	official White House photographer, Clinton administration	B.A.	
Susan Crile	1965	painter; faculty, Hunter College	B.A.	
Helen Frankenthaler	1949	painter; pioneer in abstract expressionism	B.A.	
Anna Gaskell	1992	photographer; named as one of three Best and Brightest art photographers in America by Esquire magazine	B.A.	
Maren Hassinger	1969	installation, sculpture, and performance artist also working in video; director of the Rinehart School of Sculpture at the Maryland Institute College of Art	B.A.	
Sally Mann	1973	photographer; named one of "America's best photographers" by TIME magazine; author, Deep South, Proud Flesh	B.A.	
Jill Nathanson		painter, color field painting	B.A.	
Robert Perkins		poet and artist	B.A.	
Anne Poor		painter and war correspondent in World War II	B.A.	
Nigel Poor		photographer, podcaster, cofounder of Ear Hustle	B.A.	
Tom Sachs	1989	installation artist; work appeared in New York Times Magazine, Elle Décor magazine, The New York Post, GQ	B.A.	
Cosmo Whyte	2001	Jamaican-born American sculptor, painter, installation artist, educator	B.A.	
Marian Zazeela	1960	light-artist, designer, painter and musician	B.A.	
Jane Zweibel	1981	painter, mixed media art, sculpture	B.A.	

=== Writing ===
Name	Class year	Notability	Degree	Citation
Mohammed Naseehu Ali	1995	author; book, The Prophet of Zongo Street	B.A.	
Claire Blatchford	1966	author and deafness advocate; book, Turning: Words Heard from Within	B.A.	
Carolyn Cassady	1944	author; book, Off the Road: My Years with Cassady, Kerouac, and Ginsberg	B.A.	
Jaime Clarke	1997	novelist and editor	MFA	
Bruna Dantas Lobato	2015	novelist and translator; winner of the 2023 National Book Award in Translated Literature; professor at Grinnell College	BA	
Kiran Desai	1993	author; books, Hullabaloo in the Guava Orchard (New York Times Notable Book) and Inheritance of Loss (winner of the 2006 Man Booker Prize for fiction)	B.A.	
Gretel Ehrlich	1967	author; books, Arctic Heart: A Poem Cycle, Islands, The Universe, Home, This Cold Heaven: Seven Seasons in Greenland, The Future of Ice: A Journey into Cold; Whiting Creative Writing award, Guggenheim fellowship	B.A.	
Jill Eisenstadt	1985	novelist; books, From Rockaway and Kiss Out	B.A.	
Bret Easton Ellis	1986	author; books, Less Than Zero, The Rules of Attraction, American Psycho, Lunar Park, The Informers	B.A.	
Lynn Emanuel	1972	poet; books, Hotel Fiesta, The Dig, Then, Suddenly; National Poetry Series Award, Pushcart Prize, NEA, professor at University of Pittsburgh	B.A.	
Elizabeth Frank	1967	author; Pulitzer Prize for Louise Bogan: A Portrait; Cheat and Charmer: A Novel, Joseph E. Harry Chair in Modern Languages and Literature, Bard College	B.A.	
M. B. Goffstein	1962	author-illustrator; books, Natural History, An Artist, Fish for Supper, Artists' Helpers Enjoy the Evenings, Biography of Miss Go Chi: Novelettos & Poems	B.A.	
Tod Goldberg	2009	author; books, Gangsterland, Living Dead Girl, Other Resort Cities, Burn Notice series	M.F.A.	
Sandra Hochman	1957	poet and novelist, books, Manhattan Pastures, Jogging: A Love Story, Playing Tahoe; 1963 Yale Series of Younger Poets Award	B.A.	
Katharine Holabird	1969	writer; author of Angelina Ballerina books	B.A.	
Barbara Howes	1937	poet; wife of William Jay Smith	B.A.	
Jonathan Lethem	1986	author; books, You Don't Love Me Yet, The Fortress of Solitude, Motherless Brooklyn (National Book Critics Circle Award), 2005 MacArthur "Genius" Award winner, Wastelands: Stories of the Apocalypse, Chronic City, appointed Disney professor of creative writing at Pomona College	B.A.	
Cynthia Macdonald	1950	poet; books, Amputations, (W)holes, I Can't Remember	B.A.	
Kathleen Norris	1969	author of Dakota: A Spiritual Geography, The Cloister Walk, Amazing Grace: A Vocabulary of Faith (New York Times Notable Book), and Acedia & Me: A Marriage, Monks, and a Writer's Life; Guggenheim fellowship	B.A.	
Michael Pollan	1976	author; books, In Defense of Food, The Omnivore's Dilemma, The Botany of Desire (New York Times bestseller), Second Nature: A Gardener's Education, and A Place of My Own: The Education of an Amateur Builder	B.A.	
Mary Ruefle	1974	poet and essayist; books, Madness Rock and Honey (National Book Critics Circle Award Finalist), A Little White Shadow, Among the Musk Ox People; recipient of William Carlos Williams Award	B.A.	
Eva Salzman	1982	poet; books, The English Earthquake, Bargain with the Watchman	B.A.	
Reginald Shepherd	1988	poet, books, Some Are Drowning, Wrong, Otherhood	B.A.	
Donna Tartt	1986	author; 2014 Pulitzer Prize Winner for The Goldfinch; books, The Secret History, The Little Friend	B.A.	
Anne Waldman	1966	poet, books, Marriage: A Sentence, In the Room of Never Grieve, professor at Naropa University	B.A.	
Thisuri Wanniarachchi	2016	author; books, Colombo Streets, The Terrorist's Daughter	B.A.	
Susan Wheeler	1977	poet; books, Smokes, Bag o' Diamonds, Meme; Norma Farber First Book Award and finalist for National Book Award; director of Creative Writing at Princeton University	B.A.	

=== Fictional characters ===
Fictional work	Date	Fictional person	Degree	Reference
Cheers	1982	Diane Chambers, a bartender in Boston	B.A.	
Sinister	~1992	The film's protagonist, Ellison Oswalt, a true crime writer, graduated from Bennington.	B.A.	
V.	1963	Rachel Owlglass, a wealthy woman from Long Island's Five Towns, graduated from Bennington.	B.A.	

== Notable current faculty ==
- Benjamin Anastas
- April Bernard
- J Stoner Blackwell
- Kitty Brazelton
- Brian Campion
- Susan Cheever
- Franny Choi
- Annabel Davis-Goff
- Michael Dumanis
- Anaïs Duplan
- Marguerite Feitlowitz
- Monica Ferrell
- David Gates
- Mariam Ghani
- Amy Hempel
- Sherry Kramer
- Dinah Lenney
- Jen Liu
- Mary Lum
- Ann Pibal
- Lynne Sharon Schwartz
- Allen Shawn
- Craig Morgan Teicher
- Mark Wunderlich

== Notable former faculty ==
- Kathleen Alcott: novelist
- W. H. Auden: gave a series of lectures on Shakespeare in the spring of 1946; resided in the Leigh house faculty apartment
- Steven Bach
- Ben Belitt: poet and language professor
- Eric Bentley
- Henry Brant: composer
- Kenneth Burke: critic
- Louis Calabro: composer
- Sir Anthony Caro: British sculptor
- Ronald L. Cohen: psychologist
- Bernard Cooper: novelist
- Nicholas Delbanco: novelist and director of the Bennington Writers' Workshop
- Bill Dixon: musician
- Peter Drucker: management guru and writer
- Paul Feeley: painter
- Francis Fergusson: French scholar and translator
- Vivian Fine: composer
- Claude Fredericks: poet
- Buckminster Fuller
- John Gardner: novelist
- Martha Graham: dancer
- Milford Graves: musician
- Lucy Grealy: poet and writer
- Clement Greenberg: art critic and historian
- Richard Haas: artist
- Martha Hill: dancer
- Edward Hoagland: writer
- Stanley Edgar Hyman: literary critic (whose wife Shirley Jackson used settings in and around Bennington College in her famous short story "The Lottery")
- Susie Ibarra: musician
- Lyman Kipp: sculptor
- Stanley Kunitz: poet
- Ronnie Landfield: painter, (guest instructor) 1968
- José Limón: dancer and choreographer
- Mac Maharaj: South African politician
- Bernard Malamud: novelist
- Harry Mathews: poet, novelist, essayist
- Donald McKayle: dancer and choreographer
- Roland Merullo: author
- Howard Nemerov: gpoet
- Kenneth Noland: painter
- Jules Olitski: painter
- Mary Oliver: poet
- Camille Paglia: critic
- Gail Thain Parker: president and author
- Wendy Perron: dancer/choreographer
- John Plumb: painter
- Mark Poirier: novelist and short story writer
- Larry Poons: painter
- Theodore Roethke: poet
- Mary Ruefle: poet
- Joel Shapiro: New York sculptor
- Mary Josephine Shelly: colonel
- Brando Skyhorse: novelist
- Barbara Herrnstein Smith: professor and author
- David Smith: sculptor
- Glen Van Brummelen: historian of mathematics, former president of Canadian Society for History and Philosophy of Mathematics, founding faculty member of Quest University
- Phillip B. Williams: poet
- Isaac Witkin: sculptor
- Robert Woodworth: botanist and pioneer of time-lapse photography
