= Ow ∞ =

2026 studio album by Sylvan Esso

Studio album by Sylvan Esso
- Released: September 11, 2026
- Recorded: Betty's, Chapel Hill, North Carolina
- Genres: Electropop; Indietronica
- Label: Psychic Hotline
- Producers: Amelia Meath; Nick Sanborn

Sylvan Esso chronology
| No Rules Sandy (2022) | Ow ∞ (2026) |

Singles from Ow ∞
- 1. "Hot Slob" Released: June 10, 2026; 2. "Concrete Glen" Released: July 21, 2026; 3. "On & On" Released: August 25, 2026; 4. "Sledge" Released: September 11, 2026

Ow ∞ (pronounced "Ow Infinity") is the fifth studio album by the American electropop duo Sylvan Esso. It was released on September 11, 2026, on their own label Psychic Hotline. It was produced by Amelia Meath and Nick Sanborn at their studio Betty's in Chapel Hill, North Carolina, and features contributions from a large group of collaborators.

The record addresses grief, personal upheaval, environmental disruption, and the coexistence of pain and joy. Its development was shaped by the 2023 death of a close friend of the duo, the effects of Hurricane Helene in North Carolina, and the Southern California wildfires. Three singles preceded the album: "Hot Slob", "Concrete Glen", and "On & On". Ow ∞ was initially released on platforms other than Spotify, from which the band's catalog had been absent since September 2025. The catalog, including the new album, returned to the service on September 18, 2026. Critics generally received the album positively.

== Background ==
Work on Ow ∞ began in 2022 at Betty's. The duo spent more time writing it than any previous Sylvan Esso release. Sanborn described the project as the first for which "the clock wasn't ticking," after a period of heavy touring.

Recording plans for fall 2024 were disrupted by flooding in North Carolina caused by Hurricane Helene. Meath and Sanborn then traveled to Los Angeles, where the January 2025 wildfires occurred. Meath characterized the album as having been born "between a flood and a fire." The duo had also experienced the death of Meath's close friend Jessica from sudden liver failure in 2023.

In 2025 the pair began fully releasing music under their label Psychic Hotline, increasing control over timing and distribution. In September 2025 they removed their catalog from Spotify in protest of then-CEO Daniel Ek's investment in Helsing, a company developing artificial-intelligence systems for military use, stating they could not continue to place their work on a platform that "directly funds war machines."

Before the album's announcement, Meath noted that they had been exploring late-1990s breakbeat music, citing Boards of Canada, Beck's Odelay, Madonna's Ray of Light, and Soul Coughing. The duo had been creating their own samples of themselves.

== Recording ==
The album was recorded at Betty's. Meath and Sanborn are credited as producers. Sessions involved the largest group of collaborators assembled for a Sylvan Esso album, including six drummers. Instruments employed included guitars, bass, vibraphone, woodwinds, organ, piano, electronics, and the Innato, a three-chambered flute.

Sanborn described extended improvisation and jam sessions with collaborators, from which material was selected and developed. Roughly one-third of the songs began with Meath presenting words and melody to Sanborn. The remainder developed with words and music simultaneously. The band recorded substantial live drums and processed some to resemble samples. Meath stated that one preferred production method is to remove approximately one-third of an idea so that the listener must complete the space.

== Composition ==
Reviewers described Ow ∞ as blending electronic production with live instrumentation and drawing on electropop, folk, indie rock, trip-hop, and punk elements. Musikexpress noted synthesizer sounds, vocal fragments, polyrhythms, and 8-bit sequences, with "Hot Slob" and parts of "Sledge" approaching pop-punk. "Hot Slob" was characterized as guitar-driven, a departure from the duo's earlier synth-centered work. "Concrete Glen" samples the vocals of Jónsi from Sigur Rós's "Svefn-g-englar". Meath said the track had soundtracked many of her teenage makeout sessions.

Pitchfork observed that lyrically the album engages questions of functioning amid continuous current-event pressures, self-care, and hedonism. Paste identified grief as a central throughline, with songs addressing life after loss. "Jessica" was widely noted as concerning the duo's late friend.

Meath summarized the album's core idea as the necessity of accepting repeated hurt: "Living hurts forever, and then it stops. But also it's a little silly." The title incorporates an infinity symbol, which reflects the notion that living well requires saying "ow" an infinite number of times. The cover depicts Meath holding a sledgehammer behind a rainbow stripe. On the vinyl edition, the stripe can be moved aside to reveal her bare chest.

== Release and promotion ==
"Hot Slob" was released on June 10, 2026, accompanied by tour announcements. A week-long residency at Sid the Cat Auditorium in South Pasadena, California, beginning June 15, sold out in approximately 30 minutes. The expanded lineup performed the new album in full. The album was formally announced on July 21, 2026, along with the release of "Concrete Glen". "On & On" followed on August 25, 2026. A supporting North American tour began October 1, 2026, in Atlanta. The duo also revived their Good Moon festival in Durham, North Carolina, on October 8–10.

Ow ∞ was released on September 11, 2026, without availability on streaming service Spotify. The band had previously removed its catalog from the service in September 2025 in protest of then-CEO Daniel Ek's investment in Helsing, a company developing artificial-intelligence systems for military use. On September 18, 2026, the catalog, including the new album, returned to Spotify. Meath stated that remaining off the platform had become financially unsustainable for employing the band's staff and collaborators, while affirming that she and Sanborn's political views had not changed and encouraging listeners to use alternatives such as Bandcamp when possible. Absence from Spotify had created a barrier to access for a self-released album and affected multiple aspects of their career.

== Critical reception ==
Professional ratings
Review scores
| Source | Rating |
|---|---|
| Our Culture Mag | 4/5 stars |
| Pitchfork | 7.8/10 stars |
| QRO Mag | 8/10 stars |
| Spectrum Culture | 75% |

Critical response was generally positive. Pitchfork described the album as "especially coherent," with a clearer emotional arc and more finely tuned production than earlier Sylvan Esso records. Musikexpress characterized it as the band's most energetic and catchiest release in years. Stereogum called the album "excellent." Paste observed that certain tracks retained a demo-like quality. Spectrum Culture wrote that the first half required patience, but that the second half constituted the most engaging sequence in their discography.

=== Commercial performance ===
Chart performance for Ow ∞
| Chart (2026) | Peak position |
|---|---|
| Billboard Top Album Sales | 17 |
| Billboard Indie Store Album Sales | 3 |
| Billboard Vinyl Albums | 16 |
| UK Albums Sales (OCC) | 42 |
| UK Album Downloads (OCC) | 19 |
| UK Independent Albums (OCC) | 19 |
| UK Independent Album Breakers (OCC) | 5 |
| UK Physical Albums (OCC) | 40 |
| UK Record Store (OCC) | 13 |

== Track listing ==
| No. | Title | Writer(s) | Length |
|---|---|---|---|
| 1. | "Entertainment & Coca-Cola" | Meath, Sanborn, Buddy Ross | 2:02 |
| 2. | "Flood Season" | Meath, Sanborn, Luppen, Wasner | 2:23 |
| 3. | "Hot Slob" | Meath, Sanborn, Wasner | 2:44 |
| 4. | "Concrete Glen" | Meath, Sanborn | 3:30 |
| 5. | "Back Again" | Meath, Sanborn | 4:32 |
| 6. | "Ribbon" | Meath | 1:53 |
| 7. | "Sledge" | Meath, Sanborn, Luppen, Wasner | 2:48 |
| 8. | "Right to Left" | Meath, Sanborn, Maiani, Aged | 3:32 |
| 9. | "Good at Pain" | Meath, Sanborn | 2:48 |
| 10. | "Jessica" | Meath, Sanborn | 3:31 |
| 11. | "On & On" | Meath, Sanborn, Luppen, Wasner, Maiani, Aged | 4:42 |
| 12. | "Plastic Sword" | Meath, Sanborn | 3:00 |
| Total length: | | | 37:25 |

== Personnel ==
- Amelia Meath – vocals (all tracks), electric guitar (5), Innato (12), production (6)
- Nick Sanborn – electronics (1–5, 7–12), bass (2–4, 9, 11), guitar (2, 3, 12), drums (2, 3, 7), vocals (3), drum programming (4, 5), piano (5), organ (11), percussion (11), mixing (3, 11)
- Jake Luppen – keys (1), guitar (1, 11), bass (2), guitar (7), background vocals (8), production (1), mixing (1)
- Buddy Ross – production (1), programming (9)
- Glenn Kotche – drums (1, 2, 8, 9, 11), percussion (11)
- Jenn Wasner – acoustic guitar (2), electric guitar (2, 3), bass (2, 3, 11), vocals (3), guitar (7, 11), background vocals (8), percussion (11)
- Joe Westerlund – drums (2, 9, 10)
- TJ Maiani – drums (2–5, 8, 11), vibraphone (5)
- BJ Burton – electronics (2), additional engineering (2)
- Daniel Aged – bass (8, 11)
- Alli Rogers – background vocals (8), mixing (3, 11)
- Matt Douglas – woodwinds (10)
- James Mapley-Brittle – additional production (2, 4, 5, 7, 9, 11), bass programming (7)
- Rodaidh McDonald – mixing (2–10, 12)
- Eric Timothy Carlson – layout design
