= Meath (disambiguation) =

Meath is a county of Ireland.

Meath may refer to:

== General ==
- County Meath, Ireland
  - Kingdom of Meath, medieval precursor of the county
  - List of kings of Meath
  - Meath GAA, including the intercounty football and hurling teams
  - Diocese of Meath, in the Roman Catholic Church, and formerly in the Church of Ireland
- Meath Hospital in Dublin, Ireland
- Earl of Meath, a title in the peerage of Ireland
- Petronilla de Meath, burned at the stake in Kilkenny, Ireland in 1324 for witchcraft

== Constituencies ==
- County Meath (Parliament of Ireland constituency), until 1801
- County Meath (UK Parliament constituency), 1801–1885
- North Meath, 1885–1921
- South Meath, 1885–1921
- Louth–Meath, 1921–1923
- Meath (Dáil constituency), 1923–1937, 1948–2007
- Meath–Westmeath, 1937–1948
- Meath East, from 2007
- Meath West, from 2007

== People ==
- Amelia Meath (born 1988), American musician, songwriter, producer, and dancer
- Jonathan Meath (born 1955), American television producer and director
- Trevor Meath (1944–2026), English footballer

== See also ==
- Meath Park, Saskatchewan, Canada
- Meath Gardens, London, England
- Meeth, Devon, England
