= Alex (album) =

Studio album by Daughter of Swords
- Released: April 11, 2025
- Studios: Betty's Studio, Chapel Hill, North Carolina
- Genre: Indie pop
- Length: 36:02
- Label: Psychic Hotline
- Producers: Nick Sanborn; Amelia Meath; Alex Sauser-Monnig; Caleb Wright

Daughter of Swords chronology
Dawnbringer (2019)	Alex (2025)

Singles from Alex
- 1. "Alone Together" Released: October 9, 2024; 2. "Talk to You" Released: February 5, 2025; 3. "Strange" Released: March 13, 2025

Alex is the second studio album by American singer-songwriter Alex Sauser-Monnig, under the stage name Daughter of Swords. It was released on April 11, 2025, by Psychic Hotline in LP, CD and digital formats, and consists of three singles, "Alone Together", "Talk to You", and "Strange".

== Background ==
Noted as an upbeat "synth-forward" indie pop album, Alex was co-produced with Sylvan Esso members Nick Sanborn and Amelia Meath, and focuses on the perspectives of Sauser-Monnig, involving topics such as art and gender. Recorded at Sylvan Esso's "Betty's" studio in Chapel Hill, North Carolina, the album consists of twelve songs between two and four minutes each with a total runtime of thirty-six minutes, and features contributions from Jenn Wasner, TJ Maiani, and Caleb Wright.

"Alone Together", released on October 9, 2024, as a single and included in Alex, was the first musical work released by Sauser-Monnig since their 2019 debut album, Dawnbringer. They described it as "a song about reckoning with the need to connect when the rest of your life is locked in and satisfying." The album's lead single, "Talk to You", described as "a bouncy, percussive synth pop track", was released on February 5, 2025, featuring a music video directed by Amelia Meath. It was preceded by "Strange", a single released on March 13, 2025.

== Reception ==
Professional ratings
Review scores
Source	Rating
Paste	7.6/10
Pitchfork	7.0/10

Pitchfork, rating the album 7.0 out of ten, remarked, "Musically, the album recalls a decade-old strain of perky, chart-aspiring indie pop, the purview of bands like MisterWives or Oh Wonder". Paste assigned it a rating of 7.6 out of ten and described it as "observational, and a bit of a self-portrait," and "distinctly modern, except on songs where it instead reads as retro." No Depression noted it as an "irresistible blend of breezy, up-tempo bops and delicate reflections on healing in a toxic world." Spin stated, "Whatever the answer, Alex remains a refreshing album for our current moment, when we're all seeking connections — with others, our world, and even ourselves — in an increasingly disconnected world."

== Track listing ==
Alex track listing
No.	Title	Length
1.	"Alone Together"	2:49
2.	"Talk to You"	2:20
3.	"Hard On"	3:04
4.	"Morning in Madison"	3:52
5.	"Money Hits"	2:15
6.	"All I Want Is You"	2:52
7.	"Willow"	3:30
8.	"Dance"	3:13
9.	"Strange"	2:25
10.	"Vacation"	2:27
11.	"Song"	3:28
12.	"West of West"	3:47
Total length:		36:02

== Personnel ==
Credits for Alex adapted from Bandcamp.

- Matt Colton – mastering
- Matt Douglas – sax (tracks 4, 7, 12)
- TJ Maiani – drums (tracks 1, 4, 7, 9, 12)
- Amelia Meath – producer, breath, programming (track 2), vocal, drums (track 3), vocal (track 6)
- Alli Rogers – engineering
- Nick Sanborn – producer, guitar (tracks 1–3, 8–9), bass (tracks 1–7, 9–10, 12), drums (tracks 1, 5, 8, 10), programming (tracks 1–3, 5, 9–10, 12), piano (tracks 2, 4–5, 7, 10, 12), synths (tracks 2–3, 9–10), modular (track 8), harmonium (track 12)
- Alex Sauser-Monnig – producer, vocal (tracks 1–12), breath (track 2), guitar (tracks 6, 10–12), artwork and package design
- Graham Tolbert – artwork and package design
- Jenn Wasner – guitar (track 1)
- Caleb Wright – additional production, mixing, piano, bench (track 3), drums (track 6), bowed bass, guitar (track 7), shaker (track 9), guitar, synths (track 10)
