= Sylvan Esso (album) =

Studio album by Sylvan Esso
- Released: May 12, 2014
- Recorded: 2013
- Genre: Electronic, indie pop
- Length: 38:12
- Label: Partisan

Sylvan Esso chronology
Sylvan Esso (2014)	What Now (2017)

Singles from Sylvan Esso
- 1. "Hey Mami" Released: 2013; 2. "Play It Right" Released: 2013; 3. "Coffee" Released: February 10, 2014; 4. "Dress" Released: February 10, 2014

Sylvan Esso is the debut studio album by American electropop group Sylvan Esso, released May 12, 2014 via Partisan Records. The band consists of singer Amelia Meath (of Mountain Man) and producer Nick Sanborn (of Megafaun).

The album reached number 39 on the Billboard 200 and number 7 on the Independent Albums chart, and as of November 2014 has sold 39,000 copies.

== Critical reception ==
Professional ratings
Aggregate scores
Source	Rating
AnyDecentMusic?	7.6/10
Metacritic	77/100
Review scores
Source	Rating
AllMusic	3.5/5 stars
The A.V. Club	B
Consequence of Sound	B−
Exclaim!	8/10
The Irish Times	4/5 stars
MusicOMH	4/5 stars
NME	8/10
Pitchfork	6.2/10
Q	4/5 stars
Uncut	7/10

The album has received positive reviews from critics, with a score of 77 out of 100 on Metacritic, based on 18 reviews. James Christopher Monger of AllMusic described the album as "club- and café-ready, artsy and cool". Tom Breihan of Stereogum called the album "a breezy, joyous piece of work", as well as selecting it as an Album of the Week for May 2014. Lior Phillips of Consequence of Sound gave the album a positive review and stated that the combination of Meath and Sanborn for the album is "a true achievement for a duo who are just starting to sow their musical seeds".

== Track listing ==
All tracks are written by Amelia Meath and Nick Sanborn, except "Coffee",^{A} co-written by Jeff Barry and Ellie Greenwich

No.	Title	Length
1.	"Hey Mami"	3:20
2.	"Dreamy Bruises"	4:08
3.	"Could I Be"	4:39
4.	"Wolf"	3:15
5.	"Dress"	3:49
6.	"H.S.K.T"	4:17
7.	"Coffee"	4:28
8.	"Uncatena"	4:15
9.	"Play It Right"	3:04
10.	"Come Down"	2:57
Total length:		38:12

A. Contains an interpolation of "Hanky Panky" by Tommy James and the Shondells, written by Jeff Barry and Ellie Greenwich. now currently eradicated from Spotify and Apple Music

== Charts ==
=== Weekly charts ===
Chart (2014)	Peak position
US Billboard 200	39
US Independent Albums (Billboard)	7
US Top Alternative Albums (Billboard)	9
US Top Dance Albums (Billboard)	4
US Top Rock Albums (Billboard)	12

=== Year-end charts ===
Chart (2014)	Position
US Top Dance/Electronic Albums (Billboard)	15
Chart (2015)	Position
US Top Dance/Electronic Albums (Billboard)	15
