= Magic Ship =

Studio album by Mountain Man
- Released: September 21, 2018
- Label: Nonesuch Records (Worldwide); Bella Union (US)

Mountain Man chronology
Made the Harbor (2010)	Magic Ship (2018)	Look at Me Don't Look at Me (2020)

Professional ratings
Aggregate scores
Source	Rating
Metacritic	73/100
Review scores
Source	Rating
AllMusic	3/5 stars
Exclaim!	8/10
Pitchfork	7.6/10

Magic Ship is the second studio album by American folk trio Mountain Man. It was released on September 21, 2018 under Bella Union in Europe and Nonesuch Records worldwide.

== Critical reception ==
Magic Ship was met with "generally favorable" reviews from critics. At Metacritic, which assigns a weighted average rating out of 100 to reviews from mainstream publications, this release received an average score of 73, based on 8 reviews. Aggregator Album of the Year gave the release a 75 out of 100 based on a critical consensus of 6 reviews.

James Christopher Monger from AllMusic explained: "Magic Ship delivers a listening experience that's akin to eavesdropping. So unadorned are these largely a cappella songs, both on the production and execution side of the sonic equation, that it feels a bit like somebody stuck a microphone through a cracked door and caught Sarle, Sauser-Monnig, and Meath unaware."

=== Accolades ===
Accolades for Magic Ship
Publication	Accolade	Rank
Drift Records	Drift Records' Top 100 Albums of 2018	96
PopMatters	PopMatters' Top 20 Folk Albums of 2018	20

== Track listing ==
Magic Ship track listing
No.	Title	Length
1.	"Window"	0:55
2.	"AGT"	2:17
3.	"Baby Where You Are"	2:49
4.	"Rang Tang Ring Toon"	3:29
5.	"Stella"	1:53
6.	"Blue Mountain"	2:22
7.	"Moon"	3:53
8.	"Boat"	2:10
9.	"Whale Song"	2:48
10.	"Fish"	3:14
11.	"Underwear"	1:41
12.	"Slow Wake Up Sunday Morning"	4:10
13.	"Bright Morning Stars"	2:41
14.	"Guilt"	0:55

== Charts ==
Chart performance for Magic Ship
Chart (2018)	Peak position
US Heatseekers Albums (Billboard)	12

== Personnel ==
- Amelia Meath – vocals
- Molly Sarlé – guitar, vocals
- Alexandra Sauser-Monnig – guitar, vocals

== Release history ==
Region	Date	Format	Label	Catalogue
Worldwide	September 21, 2018	CD; digital download; streaming; LP	Nonesuch Records	571939-1
UK/Europe	September 21, 2018	CD; digital download; streaming; LP	Bella Union	BELLA822V
