= What Now (Sylvan Esso album) =

Studio album by Sylvan Esso
- Released: April 28, 2017
- Recorded: 2017
- Genre: Synth-pop; electronic pop
- Length: 36:03
- Label: Loma Vista Recordings
- Producer: Nick Sanborn

Sylvan Esso chronology
Sylvan Esso (2014)	What Now (2017)	Free Love (2020)

Singles from What Now
- 1. "Radio" Released: 31 August 2016; 2. "Kick Jump Twist" Released: 18 November 2016; 3. "Die Young" Released: 27 February 2017

What Now is the second studio album by American indie pop duo Sylvan Esso, made up of singer Amelia Meath and producer Nick Sanborn, released on April 28, 2017, by Loma Vista Recordings. The album spawned three singles—"Radio", released on August 31, 2016; "Kick Jump Twist", released on November 18, 2016; and "Die Young", released on February 27, 2017.

== Background and production ==
Speaking on the album, Meath said in an interview that, following their debut album, the duo felt they needed to "step it up as much as possible to prove that [they] belong [where they are]." Sanborn added that the record felt "much more lived-in and alive" than their previous album due to the fact that they were more assured with what they wanted, whereas their first album came right after their formation as a band. Meath explained that the album's title came from a "deep band existential crisis", and that during the first part of recording the album, they often asked themselves, "Can we still do this or did we lose it?"

== Critical reception ==
Professional ratings
Aggregate scores
Source	Rating
AnyDecentMusic?	7.4/10
Metacritic	75/100
Review scores
Source	Rating
AllMusic	3/5 stars
The A.V. Club	A
Consequence of Sound	B
The Guardian	3/5 stars
Mojo	3/5 stars
The Observer	4/5 stars
Pitchfork	7.2/10
Q	3/5 stars
Slant Magazine	4/5 stars
Uncut	8/10

What Now received mostly positive reviews from critics. The album received a 75 out of 100 on Metacritic from 20 critics, indicating "generally favorable reviews". Pitchfork writer Stacey Anderson, in a positive review for the album, wrote that, "The sophomore album from the electronic pop duo offers a biting, withering take on pop music, full of crisp humor while still finding real moments of tenderness." Josh Modell of The A.V. Club called the album "brilliant", opining that the album was "deeper, smarter, more comfortable, more intimate, and more cohesive" than their previous record, and calling it "a record so good it answers its own title question and makes you eager to ask it again." Emily Mackay of The Observer reacted positively to the album, calling it "lovely" and "sweet-but-sharp". Writing for Spin, critic Geena Kloeppel wrote that "What Now finds the band questioning the confines of electronic pop music, deconstructing traditional notions of beat and melody with intricacy and ingenuity."

== Track listing ==
All tracks are written by Amelia Meath and Nick Sanborn.

No.	Title	Length
1.	"Sound"	2:32
2.	"The Glow"	2:58
3.	"Die Young"	3:30
4.	"Radio"	3:32
5.	"Kick Jump Twist"	4:23
6.	"Song"	3:27
7.	"Just Dancing"	4:28
8.	"Signal"	3:29
9.	"Slack Jaw"	3:05
10.	"Rewind"	4:39

== Personnel ==
Sylvan Esso

- Amelia Meath – vocals, production
- Nick Sanborn – production

Additional personnel

- Huntley Miller – mastering
- BJ Burton – mixing
- Matt de Jong – package design
- Graham Tolbert – photography

== Charts ==
Chart (2017)	Peak position
Canadian Albums (Billboard)	92
US Billboard 200	32
US Top Rock Albums (Billboard)	4
