= Jonathan Meath =

American TV producer (born 1955)

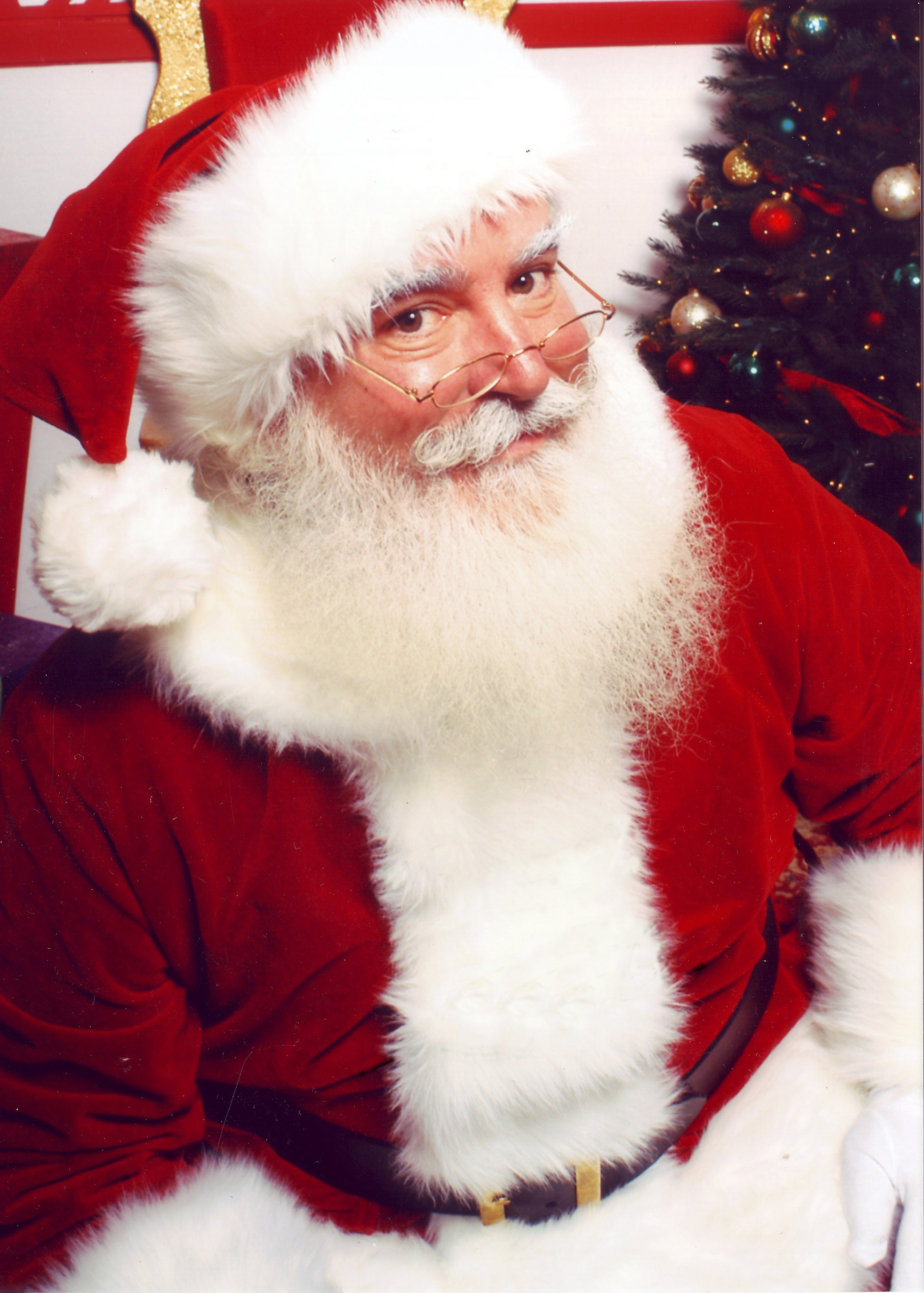
- Meath as Santa Claus in 2010
- Born: September 16, 1955 (age 71); Baltimore, Maryland, U.S.
- Education: Phillips Academy (1974)
- Alma mater: New York University (1979)
- Occupations: Television producer; director; Santa Claus
- Years active: 1980s–present (television career); 2007–present (as Santa Claus)
- Employer: Andanzura
- Children: Amelia Meath
- Awards: Peabody Award; Emmy nominations; Carnegie Medal 2005
- Website: meathmedia

Jonathan Meath (born September 16, 1955) is an American television producer and director. He was senior producer of the television game show Where in the World is Carmen Sandiego? He also was a producer of The Wubbulous World of Dr. Seuss and the 1990s' remake of Zoom. In addition, he is notable for having a dual career as a professional Santa Claus. He made numerous appearances in various media as Santa, including on Good Morning America, at Radio City Music Hall with The Rockettes, on the cover of Boston Magazine, and on a Delta Air Lines' pre-flight safety demonstration. He was described by National Public Radio and Time as a "top Santa".

== Television career ==
Meath attended Phillips Academy and graduated in 1974 with the school's first co–educational class. He graduated from New York University in 1979. During the 1980s Meath worked at CBS, Business Times, The Creative Establishment, MTV Networks and Greenwood Productions in various capacities. During 1996–1998, he produced shows for the Jim Henson Company called The Wubbulous World of Dr. Seuss. He produced for PBS 295 half-hour episodes of Where in the World is Carmen Sandiego?, as well as 80 episodes of Zoom.

== Career ==
Meath, whose beard and hair went white early in life, noticed that children sometimes called him "Santa". He is slightly overweight — he has described himself as an "organic Santa" — and his wife bought him a red suit. He attended schools to learn the craft of being a Santa. He appeared in parades. He is a professional vocalist. In 2012, he appeared as Santa at Radio City Music Hall for the Christmas Spectacular show in New York City. Meath uses his real beard but conditions it with a "shimmer-like shampoo known as Cowboy Magic, and uses hair gel for his mustache. His role as Santa was described in numerous publications. In 2009, he appeared in a thirty-second television commercial spot for the Boston Red Sox baseball team.

== Personal life ==
Meath has one child and lives in Newburyport, Massachusetts. His mother was activist and historian Mary Stewart Hewitt. He is the great great grandson of businessman and sportsman John Malcolm Forbes and the great great great grandson of railroad industrialist John Murray Forbes. Through this, Meath is distantly related to John Kerry. Meath's daughter, Amelia Randall Meath, is a member of the bands Mountain Man and Sylvan Esso.

== Awards ==
Year	Result	Award	Category	Notes
2005	Won	Carnegie Medal	Excellence in children's videos	FableVision's The Dot
2005	Nominated	Daytime Emmy	Outstanding Pre-School Children's Series	Paz
2001	Nominated	Daytime Emmy	Outstanding Children's Series	Zoom
2000	Nominated	Daytime Emmy	Outstanding Children's Series	Zoom
1997	Nominated	Emmy	Outstanding Children's Program	The Wubbulous World of Dr. Seuss
1996	Nominated	Daytime Emmy	Outstanding Children's Series	Where in the World is Carmen Sandiego?
1993	Won	George Foster Peabody Award	Excellence for overall show	Where in the World is Carmen Sandiego?
