= Free Love (album) =

Studio album by Sylvan Esso
- Released: September 25, 2020
- Recorded: 2019–2020
- Length: 29:14
- Label: Loma Vista
- Producer: Sylvan Esso; John Hill

Sylvan Esso chronology
What Now (2017)	Free Love (2020)	No Rules Sandy (2022)

Free Love is the third studio album by American indie pop duo Sylvan Esso, made up of singer Amelia Meath and multi-instrumentalist Nick Sanborn, released on September 25, 2020, by Loma Vista Recordings.

In a September 25, 2020 live listening party on NPR Music, the band stated that the album cover photo is of Nick leaning out of a Koreatown window observing the October 2019 Saddleridge Fire.

In lieu of a large album release party, the band hosted a multimedia art project on their website. The project included a video with a 20-minute improvised modular set by Nick (sampling from the album), interviews with music video directors, various art pieces by Nathaniel Russell, an improvised dance by Emma Portner to "Numb", a song dedicated to the band by Jeff Tweedy and a DJ set by Merrill Garbus of tUnE-yArDs.

The album was nominated for the 2022 Grammy Award for Best Dance/Electronic Album.

== Track listing ==
All tracks are written by Amelia Meath and Nick Sanborn, except where noted.

Free Love track listing
No.	Title	Writer(s)	Length
1.	"What If"		1:25
2.	"Ring"		2:37
3.	"Ferris Wheel"	Meath; Sanborn; John Hill	2:57
4.	"Train"		2:58
5.	"Numb"		4:25
6.	"Free"		2:36
7.	"Frequency"		2:50
8.	"Runaway"	Meath; Sanborn; Homer Steinweiss	3:01
9.	"Rooftop Dancing"	Meath; Sanborn; Daniel Kyriakides	3:03
10.	"Make It Easy"		3:19
Total length:			29:14

== Personnel ==
Sylvan Esso

- Amelia Meath – vocals, production, engineering, cover photo
- Nick Sanborn – guitar, keyboards, percussion, programming, production, engineering, lettering

Additional personnel

- Joe Westerlund – drums, voices (2)
- Homer Steinweiss – drums (8)
- Stephen Sanborn – guitar (9)
- Daniel Kyriakides – guitar (9)
- John Hill – production (3)
- Huntley Miller – mastering
- BJ Burton – mixing
- Christopher Leckie – art direction, design

== Charts ==
Chart (2020)	Peak position
US Billboard 200	100
US Top Rock Albums (Billboard)	12
