= One Man's Journey (film series) =

One Man's Journey is a three-film documentary series featuring the canoe travels of naturalist and filmmaker Robert Perkins. The series was broadcast on PBS in 2005.

The series consists of three films, titled Into the Great Solitude (1987), Talking to Angels, and The Crocodile River.
