= Hey Mami / Play It Right =

Single by Sylvan Esso

from the album Sylvan Esso
- Released: 2013
- Genre: Trip hop; indietronica; indie pop
- Length: "Hey Mami": 3:20 "Play It Right": 3:04
- Label: Trekky; Partisan
- Songwriter: Sylvan Esso

Sylvan Esso singles chronology
"Hey Mami" / "Play It Right" (2013)	"Coffee" / "Dress" (2014)

Music video
- "Play It Right" on YouTube

"Hey Mami" is the debut single by Sylvan Esso, released in 2013 from the band's eponymous debut album. The A-side, "Hey Mami", is the album's opening track; while the B-side, "Play It Right", is the album's ninth track. It is the only single the band released on Trekky Records before they moved to Partisan Records.

== Critical reception ==
=== "Hey Mami" ===
"Hey Mami" has received positive reviews from critics. Robin Young and Jeremy Hobson of Here and Now chose it as a Song of the Week in March 2014. Ian Cohen of Pitchfork said the song "succeeds in being a folk song in an ethnomusical sense".

=== "Play It Right" ===
"Play It Right" has also received positive reviews from critics. BUST Magazine described the song as "two sounds and two souls coming together". Bryan Parker of Pop Press International, while giving the parent album a middling rating, praised the song's production, calling it "hard-hitting" and "anthemic".

== Music video ==
No official music video was created for "Hey Mami"; however, the official music video for "Play It Right" was directed by the band and Remedy.
