= Karaoke Angel =

Studio album by Molly Sarlé
- Released: September 20, 2019
- Studio: Dreamland (Hurley, New York)
- Genre: Folk
- Length: 41:34
- Label: Partisan
- Producer: Sam Evian; Molly Sarlé

Karaoke Angel is the debut studio album by American folk musician Molly Sarlé, released on September 20, 2019, by Partisan Records.

== Background ==
Sarlé originally started recording the album in Durham, North Carolina with Amelia Meath of Sylvan Esso and her producer Sam Evian, however she moved to Dreamland Recording Studios in Hurley, New York.

== Critical reception ==
Professional ratings
Aggregate scores
Source	Rating
Metacritic	79/100
Review scores
Source	Rating
Exclaim!	8/10
Pitchfork	7.3/10
The Skinny	3/5 stars

Karaoke Angel was met with "generally favorable" reviews from critics. At Metacritic, which assigns a weighted average rating out of 100 to reviews from mainstream publications, this release received an average score of 79, based on 5 reviews.

Amanda Wicks of Pitchfork wrote that "absent the surrounding vocals of Mountain Man, or much instrumental framing beyond guitar, synths, and occasional drums, Sarlé’s voice comes into full frame" and concluded that "on Karaoke Angel, Sarlé wields her voice with power, finding actualization in the act of telling." Vanity Fair's Erin Vanderhoof wrote that the album's songs "buzz with naturalistic sounds, and have a ghostly quality that reflects where they were recorded." Sarah Edwards, writing in Indy Week, described the album as "contemporary and intense and in-step with the metamorphic nature of specific feelings and moments". Tony Inglis of The Skinny described the album as "filled mostly with quiet, vocal-led tracks that veer from haunting, sparse ballads to something more hopeful" and praised "This Close" as the song in which "Sarlé’s intentions seem to all lock into place, bringing together elements that have varied successes individually across the album’s ten songs". In Exclaim!, Allie Gregory argued that "Sarlé's stunning voice" is at the album's center, "and it beats the soul raw while simultaneously supplicating an empathetic ear" and described "Human," "Karaoke Angel" and "Almost Free" as "the album's hardest hitting tracks, covering a range of human emotion: pain, sadness, ecstasy, longing, glee and defeat".

== Track listing ==
All tracks are written by Molly Sarlé.

Side A
No.	Title	Length
1.	"Human"	3:54
2.	"This Close"	4:04
3.	"Karaoke Angel"	5:37
4.	"Almost Free"	4:12
5.	"Twisted"	3:38

Side B
No.	Title	Length
6.	"Faith for Doubt"	3:37
7.	"Kimberly"	3:23
8.	"Dreams"	4:49
9.	"Suddenly"	3:34
10.	"Passenger Side"	4:46
Total length:		41:34

== Personnel ==
Credits are adapted from the Karaoke Angel liner notes.

The Band

- Molly Sarlé — vocals, guitar, flute
- Sam Evian — guitar, bass, percussion, Rhodes piano, Prophet, Yamaha VSS, harmonium, Hammond organ
- Brian Betancourt – bass, guitar
- Otto Hauser – drums, percussion

Production and artwork

- Sam Evian – producer; engineer; mixer
- Molly Sarlé — producer; rose photography
- Heba Kadry – mastering engineer
- Kendall Bailey – front jacket; back booklet photography
- Shervin Lainez – back jacket photography
- Ryan McCardle – design; layout
