= Paul Feeley =

American artist

- Installation of Paul Feeley's work at the Matthew Marks Gallery in 2002
- Born: July 27, 1910; Des Moines, Iowa, U.S.
- Died: June 10, 1966 (aged 55); New York, New York, U.S.
- Education: Art Students League
- Known for: Painting
- Movement: Color Field painting

Paul Feeley (July 27, 1910 − June 10, 1966) was an artist and director of the Art Department at Bennington College during the 1950s and early 1960s.

== Overview ==
Though Feeley was born in the same generation as the Abstract Expressionists, his mature style was hardly gestural; instead, according to Feeley, his paintings "just sat still and had a presence rather than some sort of an agitated fit." His greatest source of admiration was the Great Pyramids in Egypt. Gene Baro stated that Feeley's mature style did not overtly depend on any contemporary art movements of the time. His paintings are best summarized as follows:

Primarily a painter, Feeley favored canvases in which simple geometric forms are deployed singly or in repeating groups. He used upright barbell or baluster shapes, oblongs that resemble peanuts, small solid-looking arches and wavy-countered squares and rectangles. Fascinated with modularity, Feeley often surrounded his forms with white bands and colored borders that echo the contours of the central shape. While the paint handling in his work is always restrained and stencils were used to repeat forms, Feeley is not a "hard edge" painter; his geometry is too clearly of the handmade variety. The solid colors (predominantly red, blue, green, orange) are usually limited to two colors on a white ground, although the watercolors often use more hues per composition than the paintings.

== Biography ==
In 1931, Feeley moved to New York to pursue his studies. He studied portrait painting with Cecilia Beaux, figure painting with George Bridgeman and Thomas Hart Benton, and mural painting from 1931-1934. In fact, in 1934, Feeley joined the Mural Painters Society of New York and became increasingly engaged with mural projects. From 1934-1939, he would teach at the Cooper Union, where he'd later become the head of industrial design. In 1940, he would join the staff at Bennington College, where he was fundamental in establishing its art department. Aside from a brief hiatus from 1943-1946, when he volunteered for service with the United States Marines, he remained committed to the art of his contemporaries, he exposed his students — Helen Frankenthaler among them — to many of the most significant artists of his time. He helped to organize the first retrospective exhibition of modernist sculptor David Smith, in 1951 and helped with the 1955 Hans Hofmann and the 1952 Jackson Pollock retrospectives which were both organized by Clement Greenberg. Feeley and Greenberg also organized a Kenneth Noland Exhibition at Bennington in 1961.

Feeley was also an important Color Field painter and in the early 1960s he was included in the catalog and exhibition called Post-Painterly Abstraction organized by Clement Greenberg in 1964. Feeley had his first full scale retrospective (held posthumously) at the Matthew Marks Gallery, 2002 in New York City. In 2015 and 2016, the Albright Knox Art Gallery and Columbus Museum of Art held his first museum retrospective, titled "Imperfections by Chance: Paul Feeley Retrospective, 1956-1966."

== Artistic style ==
His paintings are characterized by bright colors; simple, abstract forms; and symmetrically arranged, but serene, compositions. Clement Greenberg included Feeley’s work in his exhibition Emerging Talent at the Kootz Gallery in 1954, alongside other Color-Field painters like Morris Louis and Kenneth Noland. Critics have argued that his work is distinct from Color Field painting in its classical rigor and forms, whether derived from ancient Greek and Moorish decorative patterns or Cycladic and Egyptian statues. Art critic Gene Baro argued that the Color Field classification was in certain ways inappropriate. He saw Feeley's work as something wholly independent and not dialectically related to the Abstract Expressionist legacy - "in the way that Baroque art is remote from ancient Egyptian art and presumes different standards of value and habits of mind."

Paul Feeley’s early style has been compared to that of the Abstract Expressionists. It was gestural, the painter’s hand was evident, many colors were present on the canvas at one time, and there was an overall abstraction of form. Lawrence Campbell, writing in 1955, described his paintings as “blobs elbowing each other and being rained on;” in one painting in particular Campbell described, “a strange red blob on a green ground successfully not looking like anything but itself.” This is his infamous “Red Blotch” from 1954. Feeley himself saw this painting as a breakthrough: “So I suppose the reason that I can see that red and green picture as significant has to do with the absence of all those textural variations and all that brush dynamism. I suppose in fact I just placed it, and didn’t do anything about the dynamic brush work, rather allowed the paint just to sit there. With the red and green picture, I think I just sensed the shape of the canvas as an event, as against the notion of the canvas creating an arena for events.” At this point, his focus shifts away from paintings that project themselves onto their viewers and towards paintings that bring you in.

By 1960, Feeley was known for his use of unprimed canvas. His style had also tightened up significantly, favoring clean lines and geometric forms over the more popular Pollock-inspired gestural style. By this time, he had cut down on surface variations in his paintings to avoid light reflecting on different patches of paint. Lawrence Alloway, in an interview with Feeley, recollects how Feeley described this change as “getting away from the madness, too much dynamic energy, of the earlier style.” At the same time, his use of color was also simplified, favoring only two to three colors per canvas. Writing in 1960, Campbell explained the dichotomy present in Feeley’s paintings: “On the one hand, they are simple. On the other, they suggest complicated theories, ideas and emotions.” He also suggests that Feeley’s forms are biomorphic, suggestive of “tiny living things greatly magnified.”

Donald Judd reviewed a Paul Feeley show at Betty Parsons Gallery in 1962. Judd noted how Feeley had improved his canvas staining technique: “Also, as before, both bright colors are stained into unprimed canvas. This time the colors are opaque, fully intense and definitely opposed, and the edges are unbled, harder and often stressed by a narrow line of canvas.” These improvements clearly impressed Judd, who stated “The paintings are stronger than before and thorough…The greater scale, not size, since the painting is smaller than several others, adds considerable force and abstraction…The new scale makes the forms and the rectangle of the work more nearly identical, makes the painting more autonomous and exclusive.”

In the early to mid 1960s, Feeley continued to perfect his forms. He makes greater use of negative space, isolating his quatrefoil and dumbbell shaped forms in the center of the canvas. Judd explained how his paintings contained a “peculiar ornateness” that struck a balance between “being easily identified as ornate and Moorish and being thought something more new and interesting.”

One of Feeley’s last developments before his untimely death, was his three dimensional wood structures. Lucy R. Lippard wrote, “These works in painted plywood are all based on the round cornered square with curved-in sides that has been a familiar feature of his art for some time now. Interlocking multiples of this form severely order the space around them, engaging a far greater amount of surrounding territory than ought to be possible by the right-angled intersection of two thin planes.”

== Exhibitions ==
Paul Feeley was a veteran of more than 18 solo exhibitions in important contemporary galleries and dozens of group exhibitions in important museums. During the late 1950s through the mid-1960s he was represented by the Tibor de Nagy Gallery, and then the Betty Parsons Gallery in New York City where he had nine solo exhibitions. He also had exhibitions of his paintings and sculpture in London at the Kasmin Gallery and at the Nicholas Wilder Gallery in Los Angeles.

Recently, he has been the feature of solo shows at the Jablonka Galerie, 2006; Lawrence Markey, 2007; the Bennington Museum, 2008; the Matthew Marks Gallery, 2008 and Garth Greenan Gallery, 2012 and 2016. In 2015 and 2016, the Albright Knox Art Gallery and Columbus Museum of Art held his first museum retrospective, titled "Imperfections by Chance: Paul Feeley Retrospective, 1956-1966." Feeley’s work is held in major museum collections around the world including the Museum of Modern Art, the Whitney Museum of American Art, and the Solomon R. Guggenheim Museum.

=== Solo exhibitions ===
1950

- Paul Feeley, Stanford Research Institute, Menlo Park, California, March

1951

- Paul Feeley, Alexandre Rabow Galleries, San Francisco, August

1953

- Paul Feeley, Cummington School of the Arts, Cummington, Massachusetts, July–August
- Paul Feeley, Milton College, Milton, Wisconsin, October 9–11

1955

- Paul Feeley, Tibor de Nagy Gallery, New York, October 4–22

1957

- Paul Feeley, Bennington College Art Gallery, Bennington, Vermont, March 31–April 6

1958

- Paintings by Paul Feeley, Tibor de Nagy Gallery, New York, February 18–March 8

1960

- Paul Feeley: Paintings, Betty Parsons Gallery, New York, May 16–June 4

1962

- Paul Feeley: Paintings, Betty Parsons Gallery, New York, May 14–June 2

1963

- Paul Feeley: Paintings, Betty Parsons Gallery, New York, May 13–31

1964

- Paul Feeley: Paintings, Betty Parsons Gallery, New York, October 27–November 21
- Paul Feeley: Recent Paintings, Kasmin Gallery, London, October 30–November 28

1965

- Paul Feeley: Sculpture, Betty Parsons Gallery, New York, December 7–31

1966

- Paul Feeley, Nicholas Wilder Gallery, Los Angeles, January 18–February 12
- Paul Feeley: Paintings and Sculpture Never Before Shown, Betty Parsons Gallery, New York, November 1–26

1968

- Paul Feeley (1910–1968): A Memorial Exhibition, Solomon R. Guggenheim Museum, New York, April 1–May 26

1968–1971

- Paul Feeley: Retrospective Exhibition of Drawings and Watercolors, 1927–1966, New Gallery, Bennington College, Bennington, Vermont, April 15–May 4, 1968; Andrew Dickson White Museum of Art, Cornell University, Ithaca, New York, January 4–February 2, 1969; Akron Art Institute, February 22–May 11, 1969; Saginaw Art Museum, Saginaw, Michigan, September 6–October 5, 1969; University Center, University of Tennessee, Knoxville, October 25–November 23, 1969; Munson-Williams-Proctor Arts Institute, Utica, New York, December 14–January 11, 1970; Hunter Gallery of Art, Chattanooga, Tennessee, January 31–March 1, 1970; University Gallery, University of Minnesota, March 21–April 19, 1970; Museum of Art, University of Iowa, Iowa City, August 15–September 13, 1970; Santa Barbara Museum of Art, October 3–November 1, 1970; University Art Museum, University of New Mexico, Albuquerque, January 9– February 7, 1971; Kutztown State College, Kutztown, Pennsylvania, October 30–November 28, 1971

1970

- Paul Feeley: A Selection from the Late 1950s Paintings, Betty Parsons Gallery, New York, March 10–28

1971

- Paul Feeley: Drawings and Watercolors, Betty Parsons Gallery, New York, October 26–November 13

1973

- Paul Feeley, Andrew Crispo Gallery, New York, August 15–September 15

1975

- Paul Feeley: Paintings, First Show of These Paintings in This Country, Betty Parsons Gallery, New York, January 7–25

1976

- Paul Feeley, André Emmerich Gallery, New York, February 21–March 11

1997

- Paul Feeley: Works on Paper, Lawrence Markey Gallery, New York, September 20–November 1

1999

- Paul Feeley: Paintings, Lawrence Markey Gallery, New York, April 20–May 29

2002

- Paul Feeley: Painting and Sculpture, Lawrence Markey Gallery and Matthew Marks Gallery, New York, October 5–November 23

2005–2006

- Paul Feeley: Paintings and Watercolors, Jablonka Galerie, Cologne, February 3, 2005 – March 18, 2006

2007

- Paul Feeley: Paintings, Lawrence Markey Gallery, San Antonio, November 6–December 14

2008

- Paul Feeley: Nine Paintings, Matthew Marks Gallery, New York, September 13–October 25
- Paul Feeley: Bennington College, 75 Years of Arts Education, Bennington Museum, Bennington, Vermont, February 2–March 25

2013

- Paul Feeley: Paintings, Lawrence Markey Gallery, San Antonio, April 5–May 10
- Paul Feeley: 1957–1962, Garth Greenan Gallery, New York, September 5–October 12

2014–2016

- Imperfections by Chance: Paul Feeley Retrospective, 1954–1966, Albright-Knox Art Gallery, Buffalo, November 9, 2014 – February 15, 2015; Columbus Museum of Art, October 25, 2015—January 10, 2016

2016

- Paul Feeley: An Artist's Game with Jacks, Garth Greenan Gallery, New York, April 7−May 14

2021

- Paul Feeley: Space Stands Still, Waddington Custot, London, April 12−June 6

=== Group exhibitions ===
1949

- New England Painting and Sculpture, 1949, Institute of Contemporary Art, Boston, May 4–28

1950

- Art Faculty Exhibition, Bennington College Art Gallery, Bennington, Vermont, November 13–27

1951

- Paintings by Ellwood Graham, Watercolors by Paul Feeley, San Francisco Museum of Art, February 6–25
- Art Faculty Exhibition, Bennington College Art Gallery, Bennington, Vermont, October

1952

- Art Faculty Exhibition, Bennington College Art Gallery, Bennington, Vermont, June

1954

- Emerging Talent, Kootz Gallery, New York, January 11–30

1955

- Vanguard 1955: A Painter’s Selection of New American Paintings, Walker Art Center, Minneapolis, October 23–December 5

1957

- Bennington College Art Faculty Exhibition, Robert Hull Fleming Museum, Burlington, Vermont, January

1959

- Group Show, Section Eleven, New York, March 31– April 6

1961

- Exhibition of Work by the Art Faculty, Bennington College Art Gallery, Bennington, Vermont, October 6–28
- 64th American Exhibition: Paintings, Sculpture, Art Institute of Chicago, January 6–February 5

1962

- Four American Painters, Molton Gallery, London, April 26–May 19
- Painting and Sculpture, Wolfson Studio, Salt Point, New York, August 19–September 21
- A Selection of American Abstract Paintings, 1948–1962, Newton College of the Sacred Heart, Newton, Massachusetts, November

1963

- New Experiments in Art, De Cordova Museum, Lincoln, Massachusetts, March 23–April 28
- First Annual Retrospective Exhibition—The Art Dealers Association of America, Parke-Bernet Galleries, New York, June 18–July 29
- Forty-Six Works from New York, Dilexi Gallery, San Francisco, November 12–December 7

1964

- Art for Art Collectors, Toledo Museum of Art, February 6–March 8
- The Painter’s Eye, Betty Parsons Gallery, New York, March 3–28
- American Painting III, Cincinnati Art Museum, April 2–28
- Seventy-Second Annual Exhibition, Sheldon Memorial Art Gallery, Lincoln, Nebraska, April 8–May 10
- Post Painterly Abstraction, Los Angeles County Museum of Art, April 23–June 7; Walker Art Center, Minneapolis, July 13–August 16; Art Gallery of Toronto, November 20–December 20
- World House International, 1964, World House Galleries, New York, June 9–September 25
- 118 Show, Kasmin Gallery, London, July 30– September 19
- Color Dynamics, Katonah Gallery, Katonah, New York, September 20–November 3
- Paintings and Constructions of the 1960s Selected from the Richard Brown Baker Collection, Museum of Art, Rhode Island School of Design, Providence, October 2–25
- American Drawings, Solomon R. Guggenheim Museum, New York, September 17–October 28

1964–1965

- Dealer’s Choice: An Exhibition of Contemporary Paintings, Drawings, and Prints, Contemporary Arts Museum Houston, December 3, 1964 – January 3, 1965
- The Shaped Canvas, Solomon R. Guggenheim Museum, New York, December 5, 1964 – January 31, 1965

1965

- Optical Painting, Philadelphia Art Alliance, February 17–March 21
- Art of the 50s and 60s: Selections from the Richard Brown Baker Collection, Aldrich Museum of Contemporary Art, Ridgefield, Connecticut, April 25–July 5
- 40 Key Artists of the Mid-20th Century: Paintings and Sculpture, Detroit Institute of Arts, May 4–29
- 118 Show, Kasmin Gallery, London, August 12– September 18
- Artists Against Racialism, Savage Gallery and Cassel Gallery, London, October 7–27
- Colorists, 1950–1965, San Francisco Museum of Art, October 15–November 21
- 25 Paintings ’65, Virginia Museum of Fine Arts, Richmond, June 17–August 31

1965–1966

- The Responsive Eye, Museum of Modern Art, New York, February 25–April 25, 1965; City Art Museum of St. Louis, May 20–June 20, 1965; Seattle Art Museum, July 15–August 23, 1965; Pasadena Art Museum, September 25–November 27, 1965; Baltimore Museum of Art, December 14, 1965– November 23, 1966
- 1965 Annual Exhibition of Contemporary American Painting, Whitney Museum of American Art, New York, December 8, 1965–January 30, 1966
- Exhibition for the Benefit of the Foundation for Contemporary Performance Art, December 14, 1965–January 30, 1966

1966

- Multiplicity, Institute of Contemporary Art, Boston, April 16–June 5
- Seven Decades, 1895–1966: Crosscurrents in Modern Art, Cordier & Eckstrom, Inc., New York, April 26– May 21
- Whence Op, Heckscher Museum of Art, Huntington, New York, May 14–June 26
- Systemic Painting, Solomon R. Guggenheim Museum, New York, September 22–November 27
- Pattern Art, Betty Parsons Gallery, New York, October 4–29

1966–1967

- Vormen van de Kleur, Stedelijk Museum, Amsterdam, November 20, 1966–January 15, 1967

1967

- Formen der Farbe, Württembergischer Kunstverein, Stuttgart, February 2–March 26; Kunsthalle Bern, Bern, April 14–May 21
- The 1960s: Painting & Sculpture from the Museum Collection, Museum of Modern Art, New York, June 28–September 24
- Seven Decades: A Selection, Solomon R. Guggenheim Museum, July–October
- Color, Image, Form, Detroit Institute of Arts, April 11– May 21
- Artists/Bennington, Richard Gray Gallery, Chicago, December 6–31

1968

- Betty Parsons’ Personal Collection, Finch College Museum of Art, New York, March 13–May 29
- Opening Exhibition, National Collection of Fine Arts, Washington, DC, May 3–September 1

1968–1969

- The Art of the Real: USA, 1948–1968, Museum of Modern Art, New York, June 30–September 15, 1968; Grand Palais, Paris, November 14–December 28, 1968; Kunsthaus, Zürich, January 17–February 16, 1969; Tate Gallery, London, April 24–June 1, 1969

1971

- Recent Acquisitions: American, Museum of Modern Art, New York, February 11–March 11

1972

- Selections from the Betty Parsons Collection, Montclair Art Museum, New Jersey

1974

- Drawings Old, Drawings New, Parsons-Truman Gallery, New York, December 3–21

1976

- Artists at Bennington: Visual Arts Faculty, 1932–1976, Usdan Gallery, Bennington College, Bennington, Vermont, May 20–June 2

1984

- Art as Personal Relation: The Collection of Lionel and Laura Nowak, Usdan Gallery, Bennington College, Bennington, Vermont, November 20–December 14

1987–1988

- Fifty Years of Collecting: An Anniversary Selection, Solomon R. Guggenheim Museum, New York, November 13, 1987 – March 13, 1988

1988

- Made in the Sixties: Painting and Sculpture from the Permanent Collection of the Whitney Museum of American Art, Whitney Museum of American Art, New York, April 18–July 13

1991–1992

- Stubborn Painting, Now and Then, Max Protech Gallery, New York, December 19, 1991 – January 25, 1992

1997

- Works on Paper, Lawrence Markey Gallery, New York, September–October

1998

- The Green Mountain Boys: Caro, Feeley, Noland, and Olitski at Bennington in the 1960s, André Emmerich Gallery, New York, January 8–February 28, 1998; Usdan Gallery, Bennington College, Bennington, Vermont, March 10–April 4
- Painting: Now and Forever, Part I, Matthew Marks Gallery, New York, June 25–July 31

1999

- Shaping a Generation: The Art and Artists of Betty Parsons, Heckscher Museum of Art, Huntington, New York, February 27–April 18

2001

- Kasmin’s Sixties, Paul Kasmin Gallery, New York, April 26–May 26
- Clement Greenberg: A Critic’s Collection, Portland Art Museum, Portland, Oregon, July 14–September 16
- Tenth Anniversary Exhibition: 100 Drawings and Photographs, Matthew Marks Gallery, New York, November 3–December 22

2008

- Painting: Now and Forever, Part II, Matthew Marks Gallery, New York, July 3–August 15

2010–2011

- Color Fields, Deutsche Guggenheim, Berlin, October 22, 2010 – January 10, 2011

2014

- Pop Abstraction, Fredericks & Freiser and Garth Greenan Gallery, New York, January 18–February 14
- Starting Out: 9 Abstract Painters, 1958–1971, Tibor de Nagy Gallery, New York, June 5–August 1
- Contemporary Highlights: Abstraction and Form, Wadsworth Atheneum, Hartford, Connecticut, May 24–October 19
- A Drawing Show, Matthew Marks Gallery, October 4–November 29
- Bennington Modernism, Bennington Museum, Vermont, July 2014–

2016

- The Congregation, Jack Hanley Gallery, New York, September 8–October 9

2017

- Colour Is, Waddington Custot, London, March 1–April 22

== Collections ==
Feeley's work can be found in prominent collections in America and elsewhere, including the following:

- Albright-Knox Art Gallery, Buffalo
- Baltimore Museum of Art
- Broad Art Museum, Michigan State University, East Lansing
- Carnegie Museum of Art, Pittsburgh
- Columbus Museum of Art, Ohio
- Detroit Institute of Arts
- Fogg Museum, Harvard University, Cambridge, Massachusetts
- High Museum of Art, Atlanta
- Kemper Art Museum, Washington University in St. Louis
- Madison Museum of Contemporary Art, Wisconsin
- McNay Art Museum, San Antonio
- Metropolitan Museum of Art, New York
- Museo de Arte Contemporáneo de Buenos Aires
- Museum of Modern Art, New York
- National Gallery of Art, Washington, DC
- Newark Museum, New Jersey
- Neuberger Museum of Art, State University of New York, Purchase
- Portland Art Museum, Portland, Oregon
- Smithsonian American Art Museum, Washington, DC
- Solomon R. Guggenheim Museum, New York
- Wadsworth Atheneum, Hartford, Connecticut
- Whitney Museum of American Art, New York
- Yale University Art Gallery, New Haven, Connecticut

== See also ==
- Color Field
- List of Bennington College people
