= No Rules Sandy =

Studio album by Sylvan Esso
- Released: August 12, 2022
- Length: 48:21
- Label: Loma Vista
- Producer: Sylvan Esso

Sylvan Esso chronology
Free Love (2020)	No Rules Sandy (2022)

No Rules Sandy is the fourth studio album by American electropop duo Sylvan Esso, comprising Amelia Meath and Nick Sandborn. It was released on August 12, 2022, on Loma Vista Recordings.

The title comes from a reference to Nick Sanborn's nickname and a shift in approach to making music, with the resulting album having been described as "intensely personal and less polished". The song How Did You Know has been described by Meath as "the most personal song she's ever written" and one that she did not intend to appear on the record.

== Reception ==
Professional ratings
Aggregate scores
Source	Rating
AnyDecentMusic?	7.4/10
Metacritic	75/100
Review scores
Source	Rating
AllMusic	4/5 stars
Clash	8/10
Pitchfork	6.3/10
PopMatters	8/10
NME	4/5 stars
The Skinny	3/5 stars

No Rules Sandy was met with generally positive reviews from music critics. On Metacritic, which assigns a normalized rating out of 100 to reviews from mainstream publications, the album received an average score of 75 based on nine reviews. The aggregator AnyDecentMusic? has the critical consensus of the album at a 7.4 out of 10, based on ten reviews.

== Track listing ==
No Rules Sandy track listing
No.	Title	Length
1.	"Moving"	2:07
2.	"Look at Me"	2:18
3.	"(Bad Fills)"	0:18
4.	"Echo Party"	4:15
5.	"How Did You Know"	4:02
6.	"(Betty's, May 4, 2022)"	0:09
7.	"Didn't Care"	2:44
8.	"(Vegas // Dad)"	0:23
9.	"Your Reality"	2:51
10.	"(#1vm)"	0:17
11.	"Cloud Walker"	2:36
12.	"Sunburn"	3:01
13.	"(?)"	0:12
14.	"Alarm"	4:00
15.	"(No Rules Sandy)"	0:19
16.	"Coming Back to You"	4:58
Total length:		34:39
