= Daughter of Swords =

American singer-songwriter

- Born: Alex Sauser-Monnig
- Genres: Folk, electropop
- Years active: 2019–present
- Member of: Mountain Man
- Website: daughterofswordsmusic.com

Alex Sauser-Monnig, also known as Daughter of Swords, is an American musician. Sauser-Monnig has released two albums as Daughter of Swords: Dawnbreaker (2019) and Alex (2025). They are also a member of Mountain Man.

== Background ==
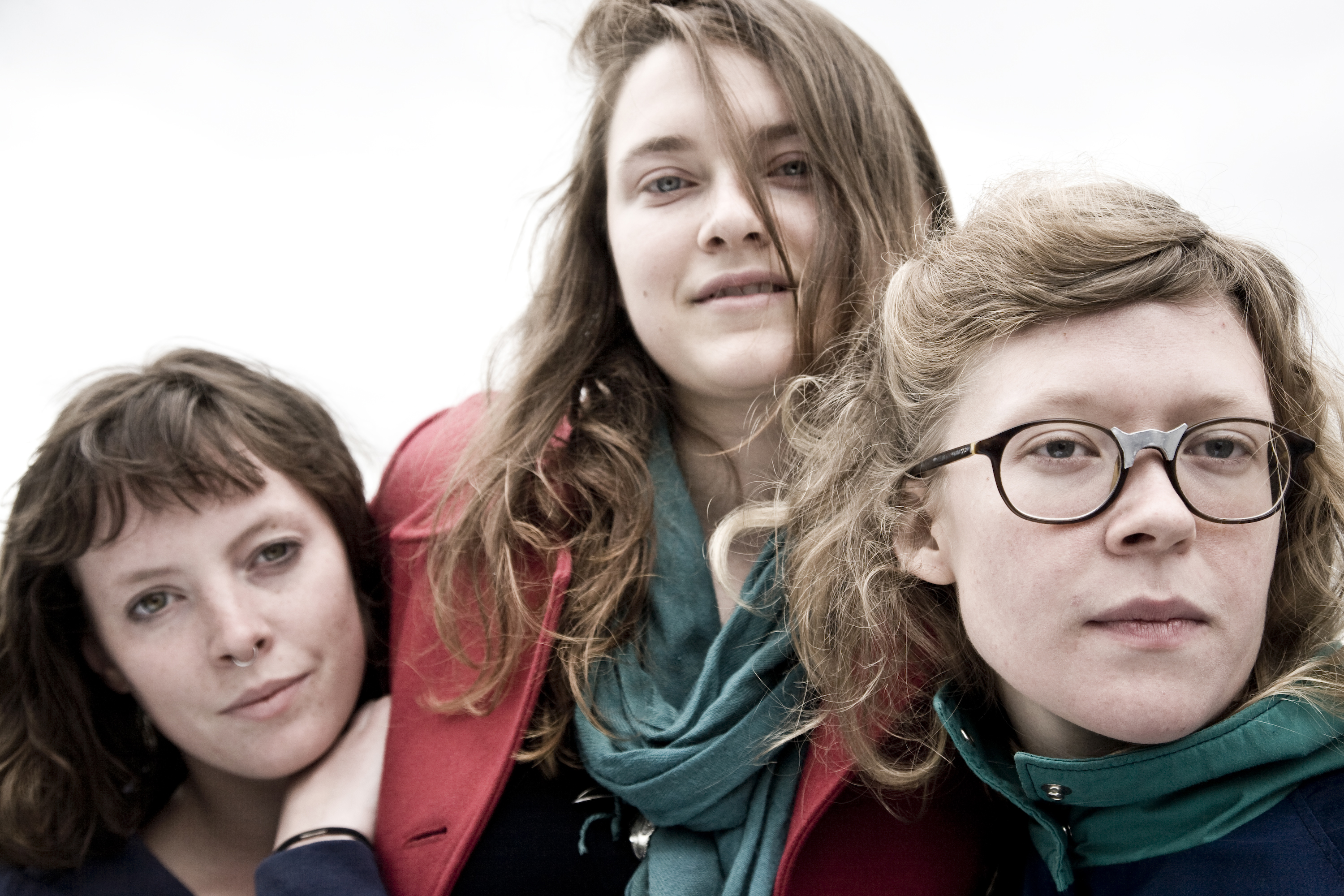
Sauser-Monnig (right) with Mountain Man

Sauser-Monnig is originally from Minnesota. After nearly 10 years away from Mountain Man, Sauser-Monnig began to record solo material; before Dawnbreaker was completed, however, Mountain Man regrouped to record Magic Ship (2018). The name "Daughter of Swords" refers to a tarot card, which Sauser-Monnig describes as "sort of a card about not letting things that have inhibited you in the past stand in your way as you move forward into your future."

=== Dawnbreaker (2019) ===
Dawnbreaker, Daughter of Swords' debut album, was released by Bella Union on June 28, 2019. It was preceded by the single "Gem". Having originally planned to use only vocals and guitar, on returning to Dawnbreaker Sauser-Monnig worked with Nick Sanborn of the electropop duo Sylvan Esso to incorporate other instrumentation. The songs "Grasses" and "Long Leaf Pine" also feature vocals by Mountain Man's Amelia Meath and Molly Sarlé.

Pitchfork's Linnie Greene described the album as "a 10-song homage to the betwixt and between of a relationship in its twilight," consisting of "folksy riffs on well-trod terrain—heartbreak, confusion, hope that looks like the horizon on an open highway". Greene identified "Long Leaf Pine" as "the record's highest achievement" and commented: "Its hardly a new vista, but Sauser-Monnig's intimate, earthy songs make the view memorable all the same."

Bob Fish of Folk Radio UK commented that Dawnbreaker combines sadness with an emphasis on exploring new possibilities, and concluded that the album "surprises in the ability to put a positive spin onto some of life's heartbreaking moments." Writing in The Irish Times, Dean Van Nguyen described the album as "a suite so sophisticated, so nice on the ear, its replay value might well be limitless" and concluded "These are simple songs that are damn-near perfect." Reef Younis of Loud and Quiet praised "Shining Woman", "Fields" and "Rising Sun" and identified the album as "an endearing, uplifting debut where each track feels like it's been softly-spoken into the world and blown away with the breeze."

Exclaim!'s Zahraa Hmood wrote "On Dawnbreaker, ten tracks elegantly come together to tell the story of a person at the crossroads of their life, and a quiet struggle towards contentment", and praised "Human" as "a poignant, but transformative, moment." In The Arts Desk, Kieron Tyler noted "Sauser-Monnig's ebb-and-flow melodies, the transparency of her voice and the immediacy of delivery" and concluded "Dawnbreaker could be a live album. And it's in this setting that it'll probably acquire an added directness."

=== Alex (2025) ===
Daughter of Swords' second album, Alex, was released in April 2025. The album was produced by Sauser-Monnig, Amelia Meath and Nick Sanborn, and two songs were co-written by Meath. Sauser-Monnig identified The Beach Boys, Broadcast, Cat Power, The Cure, Aldous Harding, John Lurie, Robert Palmer, Radiohead, Robyn, S. E. Rogie, Brenton Wood and Neil Young as influences on the album, and described the album as "a happy-sounding record about the death of humanity on planet Earth".

Reviewing the albun for Paste, Andy Crump described the album as eclectic and "distinctly modern" by contrast to Daughter of Swords' earlier work. In Spin, Brendan Hay wrote that Alex sounded like the work of "an entirely different artist" from Dawnbreaker and characterised it as "a refreshing album for our current moment, when we're all seeking connections – with others, our world, and even ourselves – in an increasingly disconnected world."

=== Other work ===
The single "Alone Together" was released in October 2024.

In 2022, Sauser-Monnig and Mountain Man bandmate Amelia Meath formed The A's, who released their debut album, Fruit, in July 2022.

== Discography ==
- Dawnbreaker (2019)
- Alex (2025)
