= Deborah Borda =

American music executive (born 1949)

- Born: July 15, 1949 (age 77); New York City, US
- Education: Bennington College; Royal College of Music, London
- Occupations: President and CEO of the New York Philharmonic (1991–1999, 2017–2023)
- Known for: President and CEO of the Los Angeles Philharmonic (2000–2017)
- Website: nyphil.org

Deborah Borda (born 1949) is a retired American music executive.

== Early life and education ==
Borda was born on July 15, 1949, in New York. At age 12, she moved with her family to Boston.

She graduated from Bennington College with a BA in music in 1971, and studied at the Royal College of Music from 1972 to 1973.

== Career ==
After graduation, Borda moved to Greenwich Village and started working as a freelancer for ballet, Broadway shows and various orchestras. She was the assistant to the scheduling director of the Marlboro Music Festival in 1976.

She was previously the manager of The Handel and Haydn Society, an executive director of the Detroit Symphony Orchestra, president and managing director of the Saint Paul Chamber Orchestra, and both general manager and artistic administrator of the San Francisco Symphony.

In 1991, Borda was appointed executive director of the New York Philharmonic. She led the organization for eight years until she was appointed President and CEO of Los Angeles Philharmonic, a position later renamed in 2014 as the David C. Bohnett Presidential Chair. This title stems from a $10 million endowment made in 2014, "in honor of Deborah Borda's continuing accomplishments with the Los Angeles Philharmonic".

During her time with the Los Angeles Philharmonic, Borda oversaw the completion of the Walt Disney Concert Hall, helped recruit Gustavo Dudamel as music director, and joined its board in 2010. Borda developed a strategic plan for the construction and financing of the hall, which officially opened in October 2003.

Borda joined the Harvard Kennedy School's Center for Public Leadership as a Leader-In-Residence in 2015, making her the first fine arts executive to join the center.

In 2017, Borda returned to the New York Philharmonic as President and CEO. During her six year tenure, she led a major renovation of David Geffen Hall, guided the organization through COVID-19, and signed Gustavo Dudamel as the next music director.

In 2020, Borda launched the largest women-only commissioning initiative in history, called Project 19. The project consists of 19 new works by 19 women composers.

== Personal life ==
Borda's longtime partner is Coralie Toevs, a senior major gifts officer at the Metropolitan Opera.

== Awards ==
- 2007: John C. Argue Dickens Medal of Honor
- 2015: Charles Flint Kellogg Award in Arts and Letters
- 2017: Honorary doctorate of the Curtis Institute of Music, Philadelphia
- 2018: Elected Member of the American Academy of Arts and Sciences
- 2019: "Woman of Influence" of the New York Business Journal
- 2021: Honorary doctorate of the Manhattan School of Music, New York
- 2021: Honorary doctorate of the New England Conservatory of Music, Boston
