= Robert Perkins (artist) =

American artist, filmmaker and writer (born 1949)

- Born: April 19, 1949 (age 76); Boston
- Died: 7/21/25. Utah
- Website: www.robertfperkins.com

Robert Perkins (19 April 1949 in Boston – July 21, 2025 in Utah) was an American artist, filmmaker and writer.

== Films ==
Perkins has made documentary films for PBS in the US and Channel Four Television Corporation in the UK since 1987, many of which centre around solo canoe journeys around the world, usually in remote wilderness. A mini-series called One Man's Journey (documentary), in which he travels through the Canadian Arctic, for example, aired on PBS in 2005.

== Travel ==
Perkins was the first American to travel to the Kamchatka Peninsula, Siberia after the dissolution of the Soviet Union, which he documented in his 1991 film Yankee in Kamchatka. He traveled down the Limpopo River in Africa for his 1993 film The Crocodile River, the Great Fish River in Northern Canada for both his 1987 film Into the Great Solitude and his 1997 book Talking to Angels, the Connecticut River for his 1994 film Home Waters, the lower Colorado River for his 2012 film Blind Bird Singing Rain, for which he won the Best Canoeing Film award at the 2013 Reel Paddling Film Festival and finally, he canoed from London to Scotland exploring his heritage for his 1993 film One Man in a Boat.

== Poetry ==
Aside from his films, Perkins is also known for The Written Image, an ongoing series of intimate and personal collaborations with poets. These are unusual portraits of poets which he embarked upon in the 1970s. The series has been created in collaboration with renowned poets including two Nobel Laureates Seamus Heaney and Octavio Paz. Allen Ginsberg and Robert Lowell.

== Education ==
Perkins attended Harvard University for his undergraduate education (going on to receive an MA from Bennington College in 2004). It was at Harvard, in Elizabeth Bishop’s creative writing seminar, that The Written Image series began. Bishop told Perkins he was not a poet and asked Perkins what he was. He replied that he was an artist and she gave him her poem The Fish to illustrate, thus launching the series, which continues to the present day.

== Exhibits ==
Perkins’s work has been shown in exhibitions internationally, including the 2014 Ledbury Poetry Festival and most recently at Benjamin Spademan Rare Books in London.

== Selected bibliography ==
- Into the Great Solitude: An Arctic Journey. Publisher: Henry Holt and Company, New York City, 1991. ISBN 080500727X
- Against Straight Lines: Alone in Labrador. Publisher: Atlantic Monthly Press, Boston, 1983. ISBN 0316699306
- Talking to Angels: A Life Spent at High Latitudes. Publisher: Beacon Press, Boston, 1996. ISBN 0807070785
- “Kamchatka: Land of Fire and Ice”. Publisher: Laurence King Publishing, London, 1993. ISBN 9781856690201
