= Ronald L. Cohen =

Ronald L. Cohen (1945 – 2020) was a social psychologist from Chicago, whose research was focused on justice.

== Education ==
He held an undergraduate degree from the University of Minnesota and a Ph.D. from the University of Michigan.

== Career ==
Cohen was a faculty member at Bennington College. In addition to his work as a researcher and teacher, Cohen served as a dean at Bennington College, as a co-founder of the Bennington Community Justice Center, and as a member of the Bennington County Reparative Board.

Cohen was appointed as faculty emeritus at Bennington College in 2017. In 2008, The Society for the Psychological Study of Social Issues (SPSSI) presented Cohen with the 2007 Undergraduate Teaching Award. Cohen was elected as a fellow to the American Psychological Association, and the Society for the Psychological Study of Social Issues.

Cohen was the author, co-author, or editor of several books and numerous peer-reviewed journal articles, including:

- Equity and Justice in Social Behavior, 1982
- Justice: Views from the Social Sciences (Critical Issues in Social Justice), 1986
- Political Attitudes over the Life Span: The Bennington Women After Fifty Years (Life Course Studies), 1992
