= Sylvan Esso =

American electronic pop duo

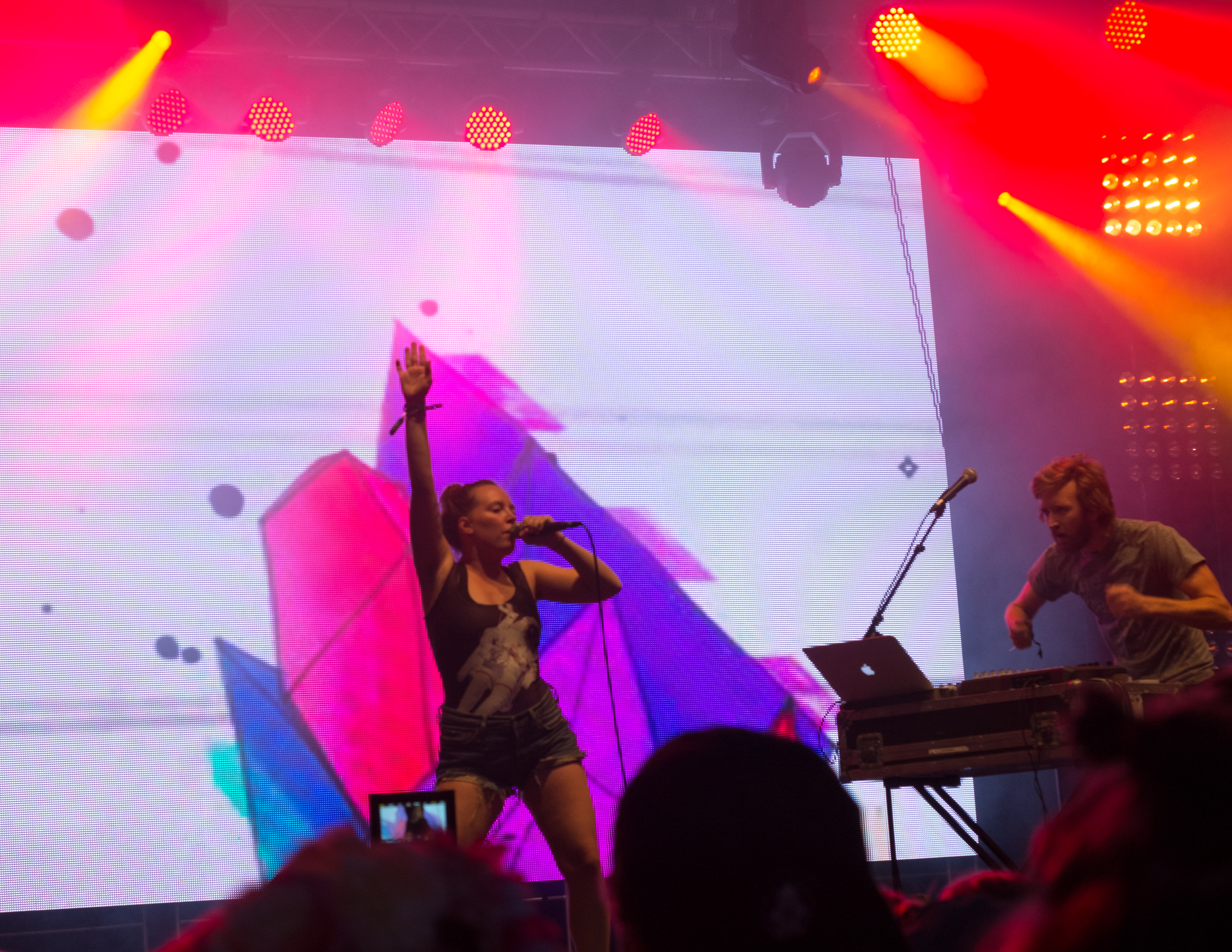
- Sylvan Esso performing in Hamburg, Germany, in 2015

Background information
- Origin: Durham, North Carolina, U.S.
- Genres: Electropop; dream pop; indie pop; folktronica
- Years active: 2013–present
- Labels: Psychic Hotline; Trekky; Partisan; Dine Alone; Loma Vista
- Members: Amelia Meath; Nick Sanborn
- Website: sylvanesso.com

Sylvan Esso is an American electropop duo based in Durham, North Carolina which was formed in 2013. The band consists of singer Amelia Meath (born July 2, 1988) and producer Nick Sanborn (born March 8, 1983). They made their debut with the single "Hey Mami" and released their eponymous debut album on Partisan Records on May 12, 2014. It reached No. 39 on the Billboard 200. They released their second album, What Now, with Loma Vista Recordings on April 28, 2017, which was nominated for a Grammy Award for Best Dance/Electronic Album.

On August 12, 2022, Sylvan Esso released their fourth studio album, No Rules Sandy, to positive reviews on their Psychic Hotline label.

== History ==
=== 2012–2013: Formation ===
Lead singer Amelia Meath, who was at the time involved with her trio, Mountain Man, created the vocals to the song called "Play It Right". She later met electronic music producer Nick Sanborn (who played bass in band Megafaun) in Milwaukee at the Cactus Club, at the time performing solo as Made of Oak, and asked him to make a rendering of her single, Play It Right, in his own way. From 2012 to 2013 the band slowly formed. Meath had returned from a year-and-a-half tour with Feist and was looking for an affordable place to live, thus landing in Durham with Sanborn and began making their album, with all of their songs being recorded in Sanborn's apartment bedroom. The band derived the first part of its name, "sylvan", from a character in an early iOS game titled Superbrothers: Sword & Sworcery EP.

=== 2014–2015: Sylvan Esso ===
Sylvan Esso is the group's eponymous debut studio album, released May 12, 2014 via Partisan Records. The album reached No. 39 on the Billboard 200 and No. 7 on the Independent Albums chart, The single "Hey Mami" was named Paste Magazine's No. 1 song of 2014. They made their network television debut on The Tonight Show Starring Jimmy Fallon on July 9, 2014, performing the single "Coffee". It received considerable airplay in the US, increasing the profile of the band nationally. In August 2015, the band released the single "H.S.K.T.", which included a remix by Hercules and Love Affair.

In April 2015, Sylvan Esso played both weekends of Coachella. The band performed other dates at The Firefly Music Festival 2015, in Dover, Delaware, The Eaux Claires Music & Arts Festival in Eau Claire, Wisconsin on July 18, and on July 25 at the Wayhome Festival in Oro-Medonte, Ontario. Sylvan Esso played on Friday, July 31, 2015 at Lollapalooza in Chicago. The group also performed both weekends of the 2015 Austin City Limits Music Festival in Austin, Texas.

In August 2015, the band also released "Jaime's Song" which was specially recorded for NPR's Radiolab, as a tribute to a story about bipolar disorder.

=== 2016–2018: What Now, Echo Mountain Sessions ===
In September 2016 the band released the single "Radio" back to back with "Kick Jump Twist". A video for the latter appeared in January 2017. In late February the group released the single "Die Young" along with a music video and an announcement regarding their new album, titled What Now.

In early March 2017, the duo performed at South by Southwest, for NPR Music's showcase. Later that March, the band performed on NPR's World Cafe to perform songs from their upcoming album.

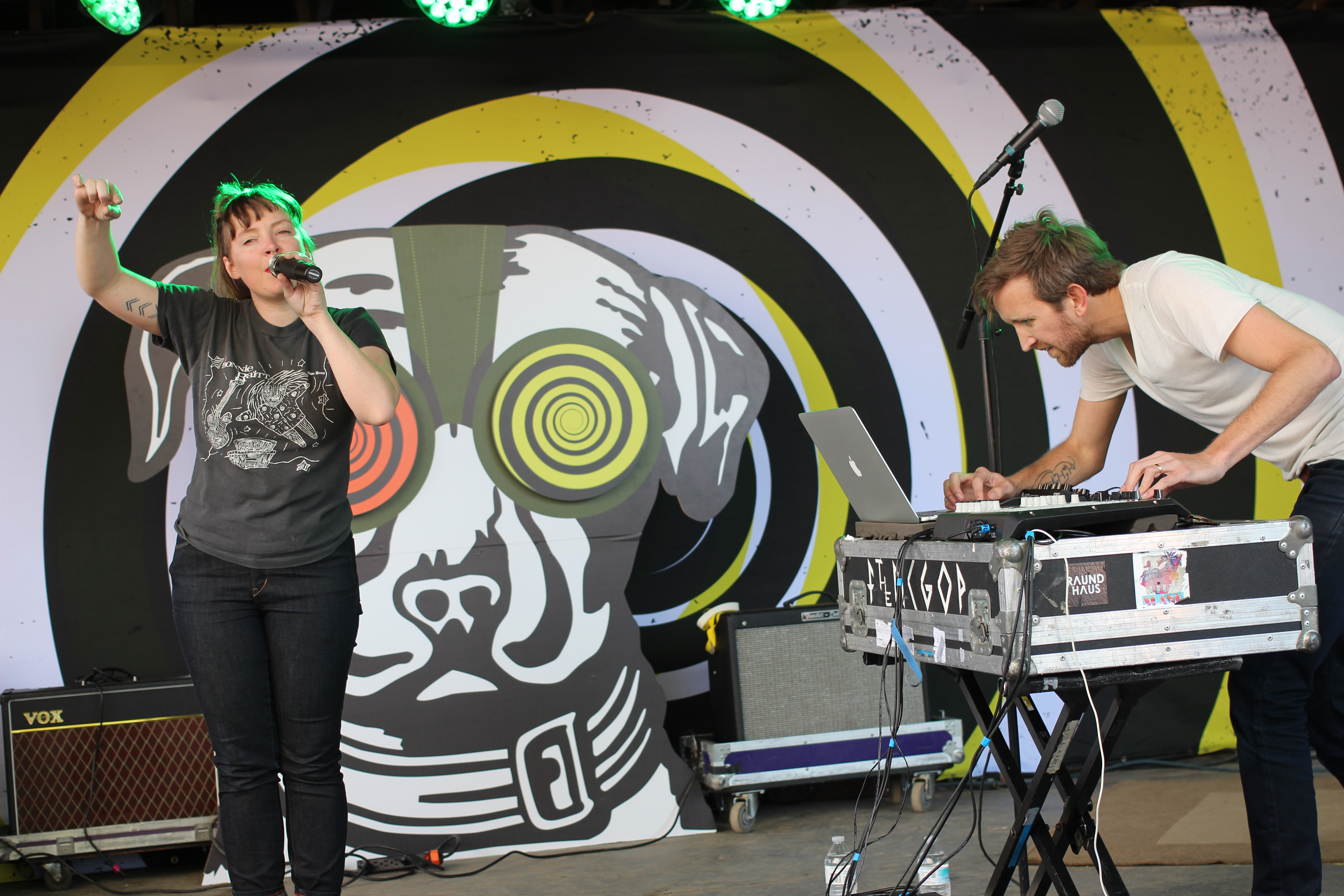
Sylvan Esso performing in 2017

On April 28, 2017, the band released their second studio album What Now on Loma Vista Recordings. The album received mostly positive reviews. In May 2017, they performed at the Boston Calling Music Festival. The duo began their What Now US 2017 Tour on May 13, 2017. The tour ended in November 2017.

On November 28, 2017, the album received a Grammy nomination in the category "Best Dance/Electronic Album."

They performed at Eaux Claires in Eau Claire on June 17, 2017, the Melt! Festival in Ferropolis, Germany, and the Citadel Festival in London in July 2017. They also performed at the Latitude Festival in Suffolk, England in July 2017. In October 2018, they performed at the Austin City Limits Music Festival in Austin, Texas.

Premiered by NPR, Sylvan Esso released Echo Mountain Sessions in July, 2018. The band covered five songs from What Now with additional instrumentation by Matt Douglas, Ryan Gustafson, Molly Sarlé, Alexandra Sauser-Monnig, Jenn Wasner, and Joe Westerlund.

=== 2018–2021: With, Free Love, Shaking Out the Numb podcast, and more ===
In November 2019, Sylvan Esso launched their limited-run With Tour in Los Angeles, New York, Nashville, and Durham. In the expanded band, Meath and Sanborn were joined by Meg Duffy, Molly Sarlé, Daughter of Swords, Jenn Wasner, Dev Gupta, Adam Schatz, Matt McCaughan, and Joe Westerlund. A live concert documentary of the Durham show was released on YouTube on April 23, 2020, followed by the surprise release of the full-length live album, also titled WITH. The band performed "Rewind" on The Late Show with Stephen Colbert in May 2020.

On July 17, 2020 the band teased an upcoming project, and on July 21, 2020, the band announced their third album titled Free Love with the first single "Ferris Wheel." They also released a version of the video with ASL interpreter Amber Galloway Gallego, and a version made in Animal Crossing. Meath performed the track live from the back of a moving pick-up truck for Full Frontal with Samantha Bee.

Free Love’s next single, "Rooftop Dancing," was released on August 11, 2020 alongside a music video directed by New York photographer and filmmaker Cheryl Dunn. "Frequency," the album’s third pre-release single was released on September 10, 2020 and featured a music video directed by Moses Sumney. The album’s final pre-release single and accompanying video was released September 22, 2020.

In explaining Free Love, Sanborn said, "Free Love is the first realization of a thing we've been shooting at for a long time, which is for Sylvan Esso to not feel like two people. [We wanted] it to feel like it was one expression. All of the walls that used to exist between us and divide our roles just slowly came down through the maturity of communication. It's something that you can't have with somebody that you haven't worked with for this long."

The Thursday before the album was released, the band hosted a multimedia art project on their website called Opening Night. The project included a video[3] with a 20 minute improvised modular set by Nick (sampling from the album), interviews with music video directors, various art pieces by Nathaniel Russell, an improvised dance by Emma Portner to "Numb", a song dedicated to the band by Jeff Tweedy and a DJ set by Merrill Garbus of Tune-Yards.

Free Love was released September 25, 2020 via Loma Vista Recordings to positive reviews. Entertainment Weekly described the album as "... somehow prescient and nostalgic in the same breath. It traffics in intimacy and self-preservation in the face of opening oneself up to love." UPROXX said the songs on Free Love were "more intimate and cohesive than ever before." The Line of Best Fit described the album as "ten irregular yet exquisite pearls of synth-pop" and gave the album a 9 out of 10, while Bob Boilen of NPR Music included it on his list of 10 favorite albums of 2020.

On November 21, 2020, the duo performed "Rooftop Dancing," "Ferris Wheel" and "Ring" from a rooftop in downtown Durham for CBS This Morning.

A few days later on November 23, Sylvan Esso released their Shaking Out the Numb podcast, a six-episode series centered on the making of Free Love and beyond, made with Rumble Strip producer Erica Heilman. The episode focusing on "Make It Easy" premiered via NPR’s All Songs Considered.

Following their three night concert stream series From the Satellite, on December 2, 2020 Sylvan Esso surprise-released the With Love EP featuring a 10-piece "dream team" band featuring most of the players from WITH.

=== 2022–present: No Rules Sandy and Ow ∞ ===
On May 19, 2022, the band released the single "Sunburn" on streaming services, with album artwork including "Sylvan Esso IIII". On June 23 the band released the single "Your Reality" and in an interview with Stereogum Sanborn described the first three Sylvan Esso albums as "a completed trilogy, [with] "Your Reality" as a first glimpse at a new chapter for the band."

On July 24, 2022, the band released "Your Reality" and announced that their fourth studio, titled No Rules Sandy would release three weeks from then on August 12, 2022. The album title is a reference to Nick Sanborn's nickname and the band's ethos for writing the album. The album was recorded in January 2022 at a makeshift studio in a rental house with pickups recorded at their North Carolina studio named Betty's. The album received generally positive reviews, with a score of 75 on Metacritic and Jon Pareles of The New York Times describing the album as having "spirit of try-anything, knob-twirling whimsy."

The band removed their catalog from Spotify in September 2025. In July 2026, the band released "Concrete Glen" as a single for their album Ow ∞, which was released on September 11, 2026. The band re-added their catalog to Spotify in September 2026 due to it being financially unsustainable and a barrier for fans to hear the new album.

== Artistry ==
Sanborn has cited being inspired by The Books and Boards of Canada, while Meath has said, "We always make records about how the world is dying. They're sad songs that sound really happy."

The New York Times wrote of the duo's singular style, "Sylvan Esso evades the booming, repetitive overkill of typical electronic dance music. Instead, the tracks stay fragile and keep coming deliberately unsprung, defying mechanical regularity."

== Band members ==
- Amelia Meath – vocals, production, lyrics
- Nick Sanborn – instrumentals, production

Meath and Sanborn married in June 2016.

== Tours ==
- Sylvan Esso Spring 2015 US Tour
- What Now Tour
- With Tour
- Shaking Out The Numb Tour (2021)
- No Rules Sandy Tour (2023)
- Ow ∞ Tour (2026)

== Discography ==
=== Albums ===
==== Studio albums ====
Title	Details	Peak chart positions				
Title	Details	US	US Rock	AUS Hit.	CAN	UK DL
Sylvan Esso	Released: May 13, 2014; Label: Partisan	39	12	—	—	—
What Now	Released: April 28, 2017; Label: Loma Vista	32	4	18	92	50
Free Love	Released: September 25, 2020; Label: Loma Vista	100	12	—	—	97
No Rules Sandy	Released: August 12, 2022; Label: Loma Vista	— (Note: No Rules Sandy did not enter the US Billboard 200, but peaked at number 53 on the US Top Current Albums Chart.)	—	—	—	95
Ow ∞	Released: September 11, 2026; Label: Psychic Hotline	—	—	—	—	19
"—" denotes a recording that did not chart or was not released in that territory.

==== Live albums ====
Title	Details	Peak chart positions
Title	Details	US Sales
With	Released: April 24, 2020; Label: Loma Vista	76
With Love	Released: December 2, 2020; Label: Loma Vista	— (Note: With Love did not enter the US Billboard 200, but peaked at number 78 on the US Top Current Albums Chart.)
"—" denotes a recording that did not chart or was not released in that territory.

=== EPs ===
Title	Details
Echo Mountain Sessions	Released: July 28, 2017; Label: Loma Vista

=== Singles ===
Title	Year	Peak chart positions				Certifications	Album
Title	Year	US AAA	US Dance	US Rock	UK Phys.	Certifications	Album
"Hey Mami"	2013	—	—	—	—		Sylvan Esso
"Coffee"	2014	—	33	—	—	RIAA: Gold	Sylvan Esso
"H.S.K.T"	2015	—	—	—	84		Sylvan Esso
"Jamie's Song"	2015	—	—	—	—		Non-album single
"Radio"	2016	28	—	—	—		What Now
"Don't Dream It's Over / Everything Is Free" (with Flock of Dimes)	2016	—	—	—	—		Non-album single
"Kick Jump Twist"	2016	—	—	—	—		What Now
"Die Young"	2017	—	—	34	—		What Now
"There Are Many Ways to Say I Love You"	2017	—	—	—	—		Non-album singles
"PARAD(w/m)E"	2018	—	—	—	—		Non-album singles
"Funeral Singers" (featuring Collections of Colonies of Bees)	2018	—	—	—	—		Non-album singles
"Ferris Wheel"	2020	12	—	—	—		Free Love
"Rooftop Dancing"	2020	—	—	—	—		Free Love
"Frequency"	2020	—	—	—	—		Free Love
"WDID"	2025	—	—	—	83		Non-album single
"Hot Slob"	2026	26	—	—	—		Ow ∞
"Concrete Glen"	2026	—	—	—	—		Ow ∞
"On & On"	2026	—	—	—	—		Ow ∞
"Sledge"	2026	33	—	—	—		Ow ∞
"—" denotes a recording that did not chart or was not released in that territory.

==== As featured artist ====
Title	Year	Peak chart positions		Album
Title	Year	US AAA	US Rock Air.	Album
"Hot Heavy Summer" (Ben Howard featuring Sylvan Esso)	2018	—	—	Hot Heavy Summer
"Paper Cup" (Real Estate featuring Sylvan Esso)	2020	23	—	The Main Thing
"Dark Days" (Local Natives featuring Sylvan Esso)	2020	18	49	non-album single
"Time Stands Still" (John Cale featuring Sylvan Esso)	2023	—	—	Mercy
"—" denotes a recording that did not chart or was not released in that territory.

=== Remixes ===
- Slow Motion - "Phox (Sylvan Esso Remix)"
- Grouplove - "I'm With You (Sylvan Esso Remix)" (2014)
- Die Young - "Audion" (2017)
- Tune-Yards - "Heart Attack (SYLVAN_ESSO_REMIX_DOTFLAC)" (2018)
- Remi Wolf - "Rufufus (Sylvan Esso remix)" (2021)
- The Postal Service - "The District Sleeps Again Tonight (Sylvan Esso Remix)" (2024)
