= Mountain Man (band) =

American folk music trio

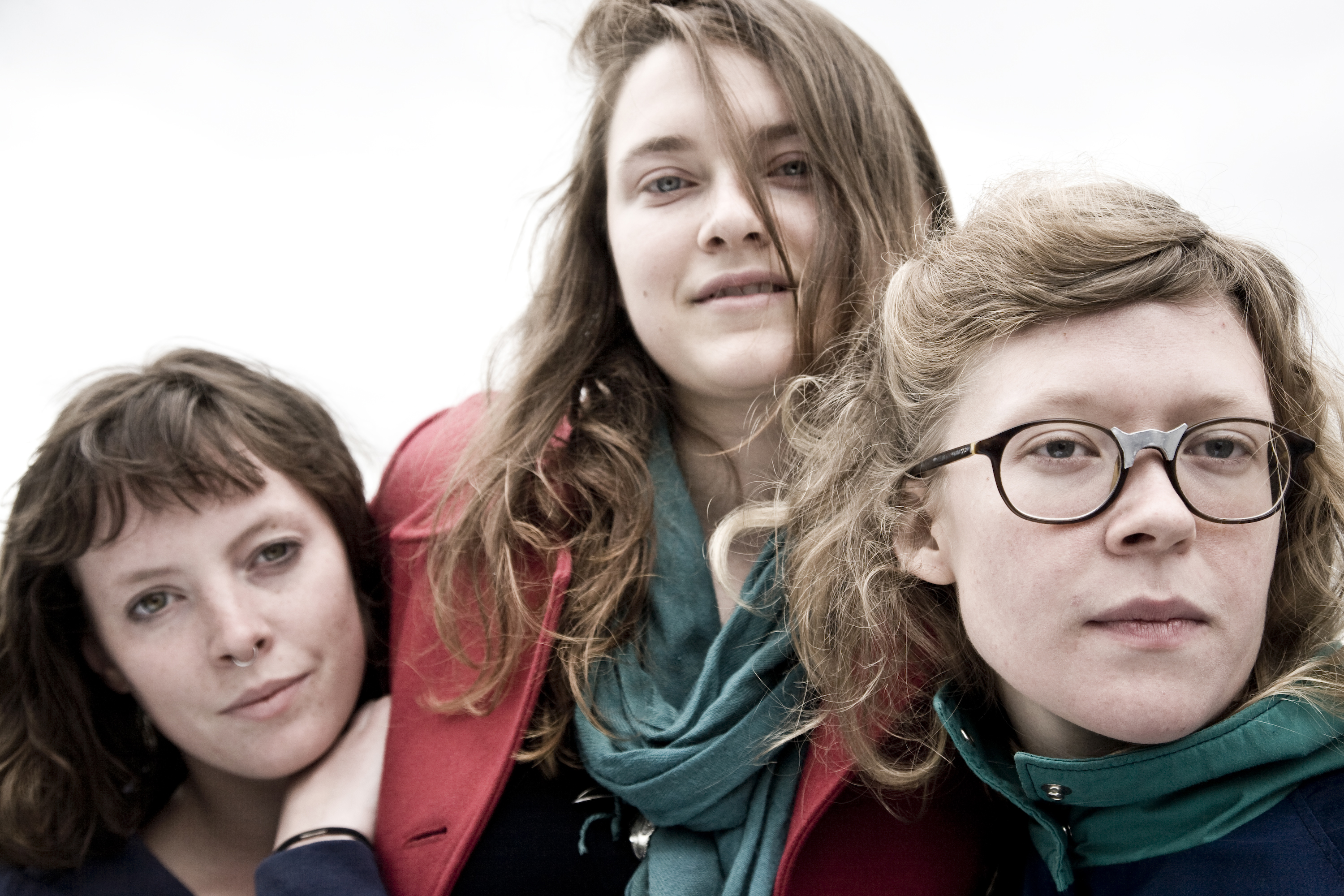

Background information
- Origin: Bennington, Vermont, U.S.
- Genres: Indie, folk, a cappella
- Years active: 2009–present
- Labels: Partisan, Bella Union, Spunk, P-Vine
- Members: Molly Sarlé; Alexandra Sauser-Monnig; Amelia Meath
- Website: mountainman.bandcamp.com

Mountain Man is an American singing trio described as "nestled in the tradition of American folk" with a traditional Appalachian folk sound. They have earned acclaim from a number of music critics. They often sing a cappella, with a "sparse, haunting, hymnal beauty" sometimes accompanied by soft acoustic guitar, but with their voices "virtually unadorned", according to Guardian critic Paul Lester. The group toured with the vocalist Feist in 2011, and New York Times music reviewer Ben Ratliff described their performance as "creating shifting harmonies" which "worked perfectly".

== History ==
The three members of the group are Molly Erin Sarle, Alexandra Sauser-Monnig and Amelia Randall Meath. They met as students at Bennington College in Vermont and began singing seriously together in 2009. (They were invited back to Bennington a decade later in 2019 to be the commencement speakers.)Two come from "singing families" and one got experience singing in a church choir. They were influenced in part by Bulgarian women's choir music, as well as artists such as Celine Dion. According to one report, they would sit on the porch of a shared house in Bennington and harmonize on songs they had written; when they sang as a trio, they realized it was "something special." Self-released recordings were picked up by influential blogs such as Pitchfork in late 2009, and they got a record deal with the label Partisan and others. They've been compared to the musical group The Roches.

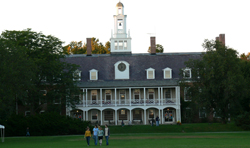
The trio met at Bennington College.

While they make decisions as a group, often they divide responsibilities, with Meath often assuming the "manager role," Sarlé handling finances, and Sauser-Monnig deciding matters about sound quality in recordings, according to the group in an interview on NPR. They toured the country after graduating from college by riding in a car which they named Delores. Their first album is entitled Made the Harbor on the label Partisan Records (North America), Bella Union (Europe), Spunk (Australia), and P-Vine (Japan). They toured with The Decemberists and with Jónsi. They toured in Europe. One of their folk harmony songs was converted into electropop by multi-instrumentalist Paul Duncan of Warm Ghost.

Look at Me Don’t Look at Me, a live album recorded in November 2018, was released in August 2020.

== Discography ==
- 2010 Made the Harbor
- 2018 Magic Ship (Nonesuch Records)
- 2019 Mountain Man Sings John Denver EP
- 2020 Look at Me Don't Look at Me

== Reviews ==
Washington Post music critic David Malitz described their voices as "nectar-sweet" which was almost "jarring in its simplicity" with no distractions from the trio's voices. New York Times music critic Nate Chinen described their sound as "sparse, bewitching twist on Appalachian music" with a feeling of "willful, collective intuition." Their music sounds as if it's "being sung by ghosts", "spectral and spooky", when they echo "folk songs about the forest" as well as "the bedroom". National Public Radio gave a similar account and described their music as weaving "voices into a stark, reverent and unadorned sound that can be hauntingly beautiful."

Other reactions include:

Long on ghostly voices and skeletal arrangements, the music made by Molly Erin Sarle, Alexandra Sauser-Monnig and Amelia Randall Meath on their Made The Harbor album – recorded in an abandoned factory – sounds like a cousin to that made in Bon Iver's snowbound bolt hole. Impressively, Mountain Man have created a music from another time and place, a closed environment they're now opening up to all.

— John Robinson in The Guardian, 2010

The tunes — despite being originals written in the last two years — sound like they could be early-century hymns, or covers of protofolk tunes gleaned from old Smithsonian field recording compilations. Mountain Man's sound would have the listener assuming its members are old-timey Appalachian maidens, rather than coeds touring in a Prius.

— Jessica Hopper, Chicago Tribune, 2010

== Other projects ==
Sauser-Monnig released her debut solo album, Dawnbreaker, under the name Daughter of Swords in July 2019. Molly Sarlé released her debut solo album, entitled Karaoke Angel, in September 2019. Amelia Meath is a member of the electronic duo Sylvan Esso which has released five full-length albums, the most recent being Ow ∞, released September 2026. In addition, Meath and Sarle contribute their vocal talents to the indie music group BOBBY. In 2022, Meath and Sauser-Monnig formed The A's, who released their debut album, Fruit, in July 2022.
