= Amelia Meath =

American musician, songwriter, and producer (born 1988)

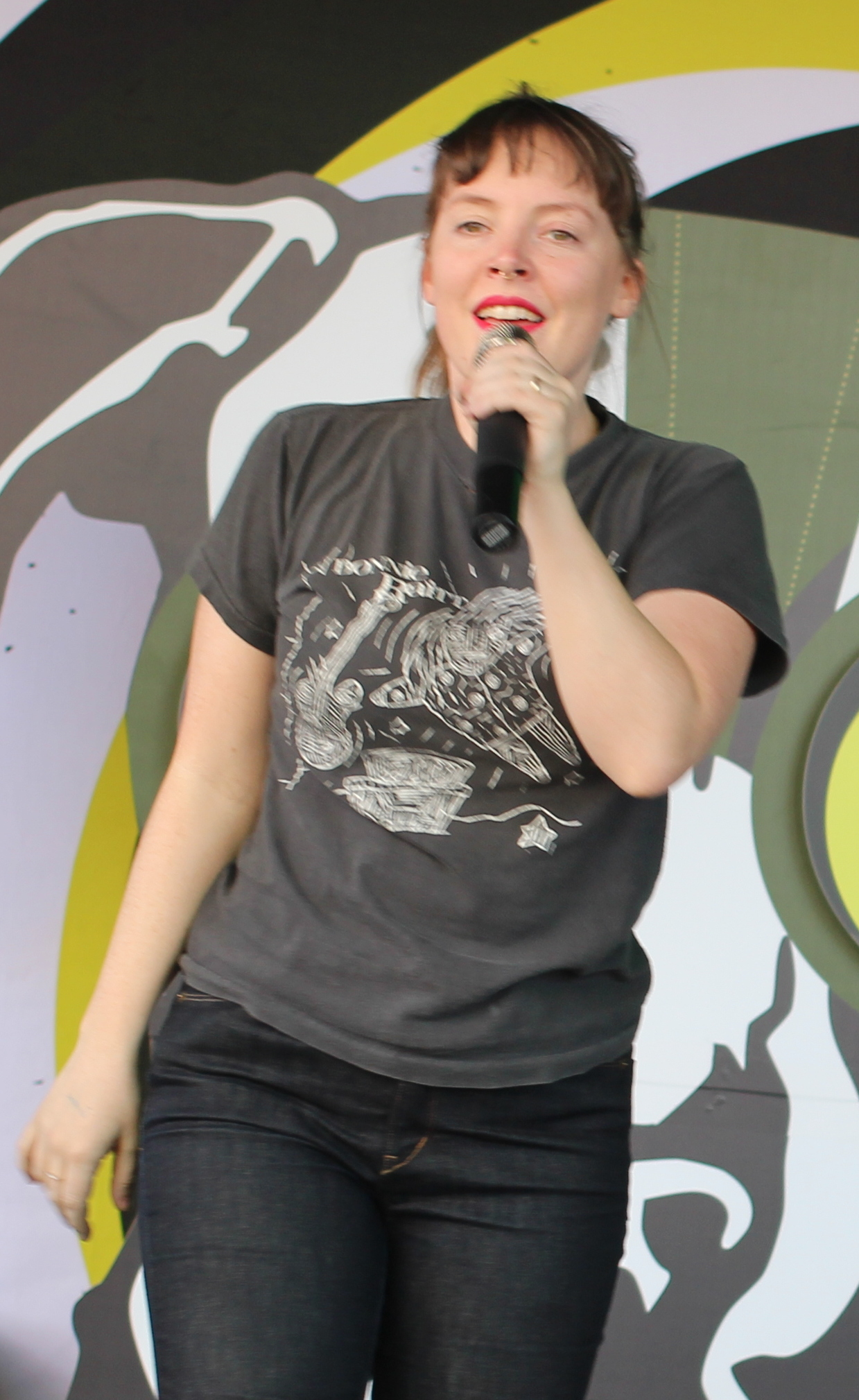
Meath performing in Sylvan Esso in 2017

Amelia Randall Meath (born July 2, 1988) is an American musician, songwriter, producer, and dancer who is a member of the musical groups Sylvan Esso and Mountain Man. She is based in Durham, North Carolina.

== Career ==
=== Mountain Man (2010–present) ===
Meath formed folk trio Mountain Man alongside Molly Sarlé and Alexandra Sauser-Monnig in 2010, while all three were students at Bennington College. They initially self-released their debut album, Made the Harbor, in 2010 via Myspace, to acclaim, with Meath at the helm as the band's manager. Leslie Feist noticed their work and invited them on an international tour as back-up singers.

After a hiatus, Mountain Man's second album, Magic Ship, was released in 2018. The trio also maintains the recurring Mountain Man Sings... singles series, in which they have covered John Denver, Neil Young, Kacey Musgraves, and more.

NPR has described the trio's music as existing in "a timeless space where three voices are all you need to be transported someplace wonderful."

=== Sylvan Esso (2013–present) ===
In 2013, Meath approached musician Nick Sanborn to ask him to remix Mountain Man's "Play It Right" track, which Meath had written. The duo realized their styles meshed and decided to form Sylvan Esso. Meath is the project's vocalist, lyricist, and co-producer.

Sylvan Esso's self-titled debut album was released May 12, 2014 via Partisan Records. The duo's self-titled 2014 debut paired Meath's "secretive, intimate" songwriting with Sanborn's propulsive and sticky production, and they found immediate success; they were quickly selling out clubs around the country and booking major festivals like Bonnaroo, Firefly, and Austin City Limits.

Their sophomore LP, What Now, was released April 28, 2017 via Loma Vista Recordings. The album was a success. Josh Modell of The A.V. Club called the album "brilliant" and "a record so good it answers its own title question and makes you eager to ask it again." What Now went on to receive a Grammy nomination in the category "Best Dance/Electronic Album". They continued to tour extensively.

In November 2019, Sylvan Esso launched their limited-run WITH tour in Los Angeles, New York, Nashville, and Durham, NC. In the expanded band, Meath and Sanborn were joined by Meg Duffy, Molly Sarlé, Daughter of Swords, Jenn Wasner, Dev Gupta, Adam Schatz, Matt McCaughan, and Joe Westerlund. A live concert documentary of the Durham show was released on YouTube on April 23, 2020, followed by the surprise release of the full-length live album, also titled WITH.

Meath and Sanborn's third full-length LP, Free Love, was released September 25, 2020 via Loma Vista Recordings, to positive reviews. Entertainment Weekly described the album as "..somehow prescient and nostalgic in the same breath. It traffics in intimacy and self-preservation in the face of opening oneself up to love."

Following their concert stream series FROM THE SATELLITE, on December 2, 2020, Sylvan Esso surprise-released WITH LOVE, a 10-piece "dream team" band featuring most of the players from WITH.

In a 2020 interview with THEM, Meath explained Sylvan Esso's sound, "We always make records about how the world is dying. They're sad songs that sound really happy."

=== Other work ===
In 2018, she and Phil Cook cowrote and released the duet "Miles Away." Her vocals on the outro are all from the first take in the studio.

In 2020, Meath performed as the guest vocalist on Local Natives' "Dark Days" on Jimmy Kimmel Live!, and then wrote a new verse for the track while collaborating with the band on a new studio version. Local Natives explained: “Despite the looming anxiety of those final pre-quarantine days, that [Kimmel] felt especially cathartic for us and was made all the more poignant by having Amelia on stage with us. She not only lent us her incredible voice but she wrote a beautiful new verse that taps into the nostalgia and the longing we all feel for a different time.”

In 2022, Meath and Mountain Man bandmate Sauser-Monnig formed The A's, who released their debut album, Fruit, in July 2022.

== Artistry ==
Of her unique singing voice, Meath has explained, "I've spent a lot of time trying to strip away affectation from the way I sing. My singing voice is the negative imprint of my insides, I feel like an actual wind instrument [when I do it]. My singing voice is so personal in that it is exactly who I am, and there's a certain ringing vulnerability in that."

Meath is a dancer, and movement has proven to be a staple in Sylvan Esso's visuals. INDYWeek described Sylvan Esso's videos as "healing" and "gratifying", noting, "[Sylvan Esso's videos] celebrate the way physicality connects us to our bodies and our bodies connect us to our communities at a time when that feels more precious than ever."

She is known for her high-energy performances and unique on-stage wear, which includes a large collection of Buffalo London sneakers.

== Personal life ==
Meath grew up in Cambridge, MA. She originally attended Bennington College in Vermont intending to major in dance, before discovering music was the thing she loved most. She relocated to Durham, North Carolina from New York when she was 24. She is descended from the prominent Boston Forbes family (railroad and China-trade magnate John Murray Forbes, 1813–1898) through her father, TV producer Jonathan Meath, who is best known for his work on the children’s game show Where in the World Is Carmen Sandiego? and for portraying Santa Claus in various media and events. She is bisexual.

Meath is a big video game fan; Sylvan Esso's name is taken from the video game Swords and Sworcery, and the duo also released an Animal Crossing version of their "Ferris Wheel" music video.

She and Nick Sanborn are now married and have a recording studio in Chapel Hill. They appeared together on a 2024 episode of the television show Antiques Roadshow.
