= Molly Sarlé =

American musician

- Born: Santa Cruz, California, U.S.
- Genres: Folk
- Occupations: Singer; songwriter; musician
- Instruments: Vocals; guitar
- Years active: 2010–present
- Website: mollysarle.com

Molly Sarlé is an American musician. She is a member of the folk group Mountain Man and in 2019 released a solo album, Karaoke Angel.

== Early life and Mountain Man ==
Sarlé was born in Santa Cruz, California, and attended Bennington College in Vermont, where Mountain Man was formed. Their debut album, Made the Harbor, was released in 2010. In 2012 Sarlé intended to quit her music career and moved to Green Gulch Farm Zen Center in California, then moved to Los Angeles to pursue an acting career. In 2018 Mountain Man reformed and released Magic Ship.

== Karaoke Angel (2019) ==
After returning to music on Feist's encouragement, Sarlé began recording solo material with the producer Sam Evian at Dreamland Recording Studios in New York. The resulting album, Karaoke Angel, was released in 2019.

Amanda Wicks of Pitchfork wrote that "absent the surrounding vocals of Mountain Man, or much instrumental framing beyond guitar, synths, and occasional drums, Sarlé’s voice comes into full frame" and concluded that "on Karaoke Angel, Sarlé wields her voice with power, finding actualization in the act of telling." Vanity Fair's Erin Vanderhoof wrote that the album's songs "buzz with naturalistic sounds, and have a ghostly quality that reflects where they were recorded." Sarah Edwards, writing in Indy Week, described the album as "contemporary and intense and in-step with the metamorphic nature of specific feelings and moments". Tony Inglis of The Skinny described the album as "filled mostly with quiet, vocal-led tracks that veer from haunting, sparse ballads to something more hopeful" and praised "This Close" as the song in which "Sarlé’s intentions seem to all lock into place, bringing together elements that have varied successes individually across the album’s ten songs". In Exclaim!, Allie Gregory argued that "Sarlé's stunning voice" is at the album's center, "and it beats the soul raw while simultaneously supplicating an empathetic ear" and described "Human," "Karaoke Angel" and "Almost Free" as "the album's hardest hitting tracks, covering a range of human emotion: pain, sadness, ecstasy, longing, glee and defeat".

== Other work ==
Sarlé spent time as a backing vocalist for Feist. Sarlé's vocals feature on the songs "Grasses" and "Long Leaf Pine" by Daughter of Swords, the solo project of her Mountain Man bandmate Alexandra Sauser-Monnig.
