= Derek Bailey =

Derek Bailey may refer to:

- Derek Bailey (guitarist) (1930–2005), English avant-garde guitarist
- Derek Bailey (tribal chairman) (1972–2021), Native American tribal chairman and US Congressional candidate

== See also ==
- Derrick Bailey (1918–2009), Second World War pilot, cricketer and businessman
- Derrick Sherwin Bailey (1910–1984), English theologian
