= Grand Traverse Band of Ottawa and Chippewa Indians =

Total population
- 3,985 enrolled members

Regions with significant populations
- United States (Michigan)

Languages
- Ojibwe (Ottawa dialect), English

Related ethnic groups
- Ojibwe, Potawatomi and other Algonquian peoples

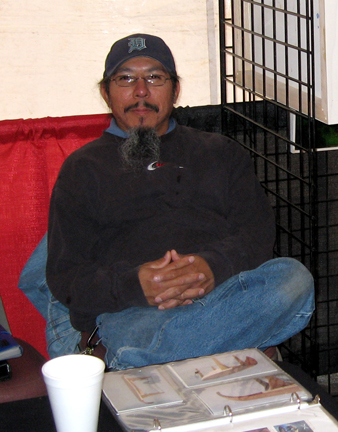
Dennis Esquivel, painter and fine woodworker, enrolled member of the Grand Traverse Band

The Grand Traverse Band of Ottawa and Chippewa Indians (Ojibwe: Gichi-wiikwedong Odaawaag miina ojibweg) is a federally recognized Native American tribe located in northwest Michigan on the Leelanau Peninsula. Sandra Witherspoon is the current tribal chairperson, elected in May 2024 to a four-year term after succeeding David Arroyo, who served a single term from 2020 to 2024.

The tribal offices are in Peshawbestown, Michigan. As of June 2024, the current GTB Tribal Council consists of: Chairperson Sandra Witherspoon, Vice-Chair Jane Rohl, Treasurer Tina A. Frankenberger, Secretary Anna Miller, Councilor Brian S. Napont, Councilor Angelina M. Raphael, and Councilor Donna M. Swallows. The tribe owns and operates the Leelanau Sands Casino, the Turtle Creek Casino and Hotel, and the Grand Traverse Resort & Spa.

It is one of three federally recognized tribes of Odawa peoples in Michigan. The others are the Little River Band of Ottawa Indians and the Little Traverse Bay Bands of Odawa Indians, both recognized in 1994.

== Names ==
Referring to themselves as Anishinaabeg or Three Fires Confederacy, the Grand Traverse Band of Ottawa and Chippewa Indians includes members of the Odaawaa/Odawa (Ottawa), the Ojibwe (Ojibwa/Chippewa) and Boodewaadami/Bodéwadmi (Potawatomi) peoples. They were historically part of the confederacy.

== Federal recognition ==
Under the Indian Reorganization Act, they applied for federal recognition in 1934 and 1943 and were denied. However, in 1978 Dodie Harris Chambers led an effort for recognition and on May 27, 1980, the tribe was formally recognized. The Grand Traverse Band is the first federally recognized tribe of Odawa in Michigan. They were one of the first tribes in the United States to own a casino, under new gaming laws passed in the 1980s.

== History ==
Ottawa, Chippewa and Potawatomi Indians are Algonquian-speaking peoples who gradually migrated from the Atlantic coast, settling around the Great Lakes throughout Canada, and the Midwest of what became the United States: Ohio, Indiana, Michigan, Illinois, Wisconsin, and Minnesota. Today they have federally recognized reservations of communal land only in Canada, Michigan, Wisconsin, and Minnesota. During the 19th century, they were forced to cede most of their land to the governments of Canada and the United States under pressure from European-American and Canadian settlement.

=== Ottawa Tribe ===
The name Ottawa, or alternatively "Odawa" or "Odawu," is believed to derive from an Algonquian word for the term "trader." It was incorrectly recorded as meaning "people of the bulrush," for which there is a specific Odawa term referring to a particular band.

Historically, the members of this tribe are descendants of and political successors to nine Ottawa bands who were party to the treaties of 1836 and 1855, related to the total of 19 bands listed as Grand River Band Ottawa. After the 1855 Treaty, all of the Ottawa Bands located from the Manistee River south to Grand River, near or on the eastern shores of Lake Michigan, were relocated to reservation lands in Mason and Oceana counties.

The permanent villages of the Grand River bands of Ottawa, including those nine Bands whose descendants compose the Little River Band of Ottawa Indians, were located on the Grand, Thornapple, Flat, White, Père Marquette, and Big and Little Manistee rivers in Michigan's western Lower Peninsula.

The Ottawa and Chippewa Treaty of Detroit was signed in 1855 and created an Ottawa/Chippewa nation for the purposes of settling on a reservation.

=== Chippewa Tribe ===
The Chippewa (also "Ojibwe", "Ojibway", "Chippeway", "Anishinaabe") are the largest Native American people north of the Rio Grande. Their population is split between Canada (where they are known as the Ojibwe) and the United States. The Bay Mills Indian Community is located at the land base of the Sault Ste. Marie band of Chippewa, which originally occupied land on both sides of what became the US-Canada border. After passage of the Indian Reorganization Act of 1934, the Bay Mills Indian Community organized to recreate a form of government.

== Today ==
Members are descended from the nine historic bands of Ottawa (Odawa) and bands of Chippewa (known as Ojibwe in Canada) peoples who occupied this territory in northern Michigan and signed treaties with the federal government. They were successors to the 19 bands that have been documented in this territory.

The tribe's government includes an elected governing body consisting of a tribal chair and six tribal council members; they are elected by the enrolled members of the Grand Traverse Band. Unfortunately, the Grand Traverse Band has disenfranchised the majority of their members. Nearly all other tribes in Michigan allow all their members to vote in elections. The band has programming, fiscal and administrative authority. The council also appoints judicial officers who decide criminal, family and civil matters in conjunction with the state court.

The water resources within the 1855 reservation area include Grand Traverse Bay, the eastern shore of Michigan, Lake Leelanau, Elk Lake, and their watersheds. Other natural resources of importance include undeveloped forested parcels and areas of traditional and cultural hunting, fishing and plant gathering.

The Grand Traverse Band's Natural Resources Department is made up of a department manager, game wardens, Great Lakes fishery biologists and technician, fish and wildlife biologists and technician, environmental and water quality staff, and an office manager.

== Reservation ==
Location of the Grand Traverse Indian Reservation in Michigan

The territory of the Grand Traverse Band of Ottawa and Chippewa Indians is the Grand Traverse Indian Reservation (45°01′13″N 85°36′22″W), as established by United States Secretary of the Interior on 27 May 1980, and includes lands acquired by the Band. The Grand Traverse Band's Treaty Ceded Territories from the 1836 Treaty covers an area in a line from the Grand River to the Alpena area north and the eastern portion of the upper peninsula from the Chocolay River east. The majority (almost 55 percent) of the reservation's territory lies within several non-contiguous sections of land in eastern Suttons Bay Township in Leelanau County, Michigan.

There are also five smaller parcels of land in four other counties: one plot in southern Benzonia Township, Benzie County; two plots in southern Helena Township, Antrim County; one plot in eastern Acme Township, Grand Traverse County; and one plot in southwestern Eveline Township, Charlevoix County. The total land area of the reservation and off-reservation trust land is 2.539 km² (0.9804 sq mi, or 627.46 acres (2.5392 km^{2}). Its total 2000 census resident population was 545 persons, 80 percent of whom identified as fully Native American. The present-day main Reservation and six-county service area consists of Antrim, Benzie, Charlevoix, Grand Traverse, Leelanau, and Manistee counties. The Band's federal land base is approximately 1,100 acres (4.5 km^{2}) dispersed throughout the service area, and it has a total of 3,985 members. Some 1,610 reside in the tribal areas.

== Eyaawing Museum ==
The Eyaawing Museum and Cultural Center, located in Peshawbestown, Michigan, was opened in 2009 by the Grand Traverse Band of Ottawa and Chippewa Indians to serve as a heritage and cultural center. The museum includes a gift shop with works of tribal artists and craftspeople, as well as educational materials, maps and books.

== Anthropological study ==
There has been one major anthropological study of the Grand Traverse Band of Ottawa and Chippewa Indians. Jane Willetts Ettawageshik devoted approximately two years of study in the Grand Traverse Band of Ottawa and Chippewa Indians community. Jane Willetts Ettawageshik recorded Anishinaabe stories that speak of how the Anishinaabe people related to their land, to their people, and various other means of communicating their values, outlooks and histories in and around Northern Michigan. These stories have been translated into a book "Ottawa Stories from the Springs, Anishinaabe dibaadjimowinan wodi gaa binjibaamigak wodi mookodjiwong e zhinikaadek" by Howard Webkamigad.

== Notable tribal members ==
- Pun Plamondon, White Panther activist, storyteller
- Kathleen R. Johnson, geologist, paleoclimatologist
- Derek Bailey, tribal chairman
