= Ottawa morphology =

Ottawa has complex systems of both inflectional and derivational morphology. Like other dialects of Ojibwe, Ottawa employs complex combinations of inflectional prefixes and suffixes to indicate grammatical information. Ojibwe word stems are formed with combinations of word roots (sometimes also called initials), and affixes referred to as medials and finals to create basic words to which inflectional prefixes and suffixes are added. Word stems are also combined with other word stems to create compound words.

Innovations in Ottawa morphology contribute to differentiating Ottawa from other dialects of Ojibwe. These differences include: the reanalysis of person prefixes and word stems; the loss of final /-n/ in a number of inflectional suffixes; a distinctive form for the verbal suffix indicating doubt; and a distinctive form for the verbal suffix indicating plurality on intransitive verbs with grammatically inanimate subjects.

The most significant of the morphological innovations that characterize Ottawa is the restructuring of the person prefixes that occur on both nouns and verbs. These prefixes carry significant grammatical information about grammatical person (first, second, or third). The rule of Syncope modifies the pronunciation of the prefixes, by deleting the short vowel in each prefix.

== Morphological innovations ==
=== Reanalysis of person prefixes and word stems ===
By deleting many short vowels, vowel syncope has a significant impact on Ottawa morphology. In particular, syncope changes the pronunciation of the three person prefixes that appear on nouns and verbs; these prefixes carry significant grammatical information about grammatical person (first, second, or third). Syncope also increases variability in the pronunciation of noun and verb stems (the basic forms of words). The increased alternations in the pronunciation of words makes the analysis and structure of words more complex. The third person prefix /o-/, which occurs with both nouns and verbs, is completely eliminated. As a result, there is no direct grammatical marker to indicate third-person on inflected forms of nouns or verbs. Further, Ottawa has innovated by creating new forms for the person prefixes, but the new suffixes have the effect of regularizing the pronunciation of words they are added to, particularly those that historically have a short vowel in the first syllable.

The first-, second-, and third-person prefixes have different forms in Ottawa as opposed to non-syncopating dialects. The table below compares the forms of the person prefixes in non-syncopating dialects and in Ottawa, when added to consonant-initial noun or verb stems.

Personal prefixes added to consonant-initial stem
English	Non-Syncopating Dialects	Ottawa
(a) first-person prefix	ni-	n-
(b) second person prefix	gi-	g-
(c) third-person	o-	-- (no form)

The basic form of a noun or verb word without any inflectional prefixes or suffixes is referred to as the stem. The addition of prefixes and suffixes to noun and verb stems creates variant pronunciations, or allomorphs, of the basic word stems, where in other dialects of Ojibwe these allomorphs do not occur. For example, the singular noun makizin 'shoe' has the following partial paradigm of possessive forms in Ottawa. The word ‘shoe’ has two different forms or allomorphs, one <mkizin> for forms without any personal prefix, and another <makzin> for first- and second-person forms, with the latter also being used for the third-person form, which has no prefix.

Possessive forms of noun
English	Non-syncopating dialects	Ottawa
(a) shoe	makizin	mkizin
(b) my shoe	nimakizin	nmakzin
(c) your shoe	gimakizin	gmakzin
(d) his/her shoe	omakizin	makzin

The rule of Syncope also has a significant impact on nouns and verbs that begin with a vowel. When added to a noun or verb stem that begins with a vowel, in non-syncopating dialects the consonant /d/ is added to the prefix. In Ottawa the weak vowel of the prefix is deleted.

Personal prefixes added to vowel-initial stem
English	Non-syncopating dialects	Ottawa
(a) first-person prefix	nid-	nd-
(b) second person prefix	gid-	gd-
(c) third-person	od-	d-

Reanalysis of existing forms with personal prefixes has led to the creation of new variants of the prefixes. In addition to the two variants n- and nd- of the first-person prefix, new variants ndoo-, ndi- and nda- now occur, with similar forms for the second-person and third-person prefixes. The likely route for the process of creation of the variant ndoo- arises from prefixed forms of Ottawa nouns such as pwaagan ‘pipe,’ corresponding to the form opwaagan in non-syncopating dialects. In the following table, the initial vowel /o-/ of the noun opwaagan ‘pipe’ is deleted in Ottawa because it is in a metrically Weak position, as in (a) in the table below. Before a vowel-initial word in non-syncopating dialects, the first-person prefix takes the form /nid-/, and the initial vowel /o-/ of the noun is lengthened by a regular rule to /oo-/. In Ottawa the prefix has the form /nd-/, and the vowel of the noun is also /oo-/, as in (b) in the table below.

Possessive forms of noun
English	Non-syncopating dialects	Ottawa
(a) pipe	opwaagan	pwaagan
(b) my pipe	nidoopwaagan	ndoopwaagan

Noun and verb stems that historically began with a short vowel have been reanalyzed as beginning with a consonant. For a noun such as Ottawa pwaagan, ‘pipe,’ which is missing the initial short vowel that occurs in other dialects, the first-person possessive form ndoopwaagan ‘my pipe’ has been reanalyzed as consisting of a prefix ndoo- and the noun stem pwaagan. Uncertainty about the status of the vowel alternations appears to have served as the trigger for the restructuring of word stems, which lessens the need for speakers to learn the abstract patterns underlying the alternations. The general pattern for the reanalysis of noun stems is to take the unprefixed singular stem as the basic form, and add any prefixes to that form; verb stems have undergone the same type of reanalysis. The new variant of the person prefix ndoo- creates a more stable and learnable form of word stems for speakers by decreasing the amount of stem allomorphy that occurs. The new prefix is extended to other words so that an alternative way of saying ‘my shoe’ is ndoo-mkizin; by convention a hyphen is written between the restructured prefixes and the following noun stem. Similar explanations account for the other innovative prefixes.

=== Deletion of final /-n/ in inflectional suffixes ===
The consonant /-n/ is deleted when it occurs at the end of some inflectional suffixes. A similar phenomenon with a sequence of word-final consonants is reflected in words such as Ottawa niinwi 'we (exclusive),' which is niinawind in most other dialects of Ojibwe.

Deletion of /-n/ in grammatical elements
English	Ottawa	Other Dialects
First person plural suffix (independent order)	-mi gga-damnomi ‘we (inclusive) will play’	-min
First plural suffix independent order	-naa nwaabndaanaa ‘we (exclusive) see it'	-naan
First singular suffix, conjunct order (Note: For the first singular conjunct, the long vowel of the suffix is nasalized.)	-yaanh endaayaanh ‘where I live’	-yaan
Second singular suffix, conjunct order (Note: For the second singular conjunct, the short vowel of the suffix is nasalized, and some speakers have -yin.)	-yanh	-yan
Preterit suffix	-baa ‘first person singular (conjunct)’...gii-zhaambaa ‘...that I left’	-baan
Dubitative suffix (Note: For the dubitative suffix, the vowel is nasalized.)	-gwenh wiisnigwenh ‘that he might be eating’	-gwen
Prohibitive suffix	-ke Gego biigsidooke naagan. ‘Don’t break that dish!’	-ken
Notes

The loss of /n/ is not a general phonological phenomenon, in that there are a number of Ottawa suffixes that retain final /n/. For example, the plural suffix for inanimate nouns has as one of its forms /-an/ in all dialects of Ojibwe, including Ottawa, as in jiimaanan 'boats' with plural suffix /-an/ (all dialects).

=== Dubitative suffix ===
The verb suffix for the Dubitative Mode, which denotes an event not confirmed by direct experience, is /-dig/ in Ottawa but /-dog/ in all other dialects.

Variation in dubitative suffix
Dialect	Example
Ottawa	Nswaakmog go yaadig noongwa. ‘He must be in Sudbury today.’
Severn Ojibwe	Bezhigwaa gii-biizhaamaganidog gaa-giinigwaanaakonigebanihoomagak. ‘Maybe a helicopter came.’

=== Inanimate intransitive verb suffix ===
Inanimate intransitive verbs (those with a grammatically inanimate subject) in Ottawa take a suffix for plural subjects /-noon/ where other dialects have /-wan/, e.g. other dialects makadewaawan, Ottawa mkadewaanoon ‘they (inanimate) are black.’ This feature is robustly attested in Ottawa, and also occurs in a number of communities to the north of the Ottawa area.

== See also ==
- Algonquian languages
- Ojibwe dialects
- Ojibwe language
- Ojibwe writing systems
