= Ojibwe language =

Central Algonquian language of North America

Ojibwe
- Ojibwa
- Anishinaabemowin, ᐊᓂᐦᔑᓈᐯᒧᐎᓐ
- Pronunciation: [anɪʃːɪnaːpeːmowɪn] or [anɪʃːɪnaːbeːmowɪn]
- Native to: Canada, United States
- Region: Canada: Quebec, Ontario, Manitoba, Saskatchewan, groups in Alberta, British Columbia; United States: Michigan, Wisconsin, Minnesota, groups in North Dakota, Montana
- Ethnicity: Ojibwe
- Native speakers: (50,000 cited 1990–2016 censuses)
- Language family: Algic: Algonquian; Ojibwe-Potawatomi; Ojibwe
- Dialects: (see Ojibwe dialects)
- Writing system: Latin (various alphabets in Canada and the United States); Ojibwe syllabics (Canada); Great Lakes Algonquian syllabics (United States)

Language codes
- ISO 639-1: oj – Ojibwa
- ISO 639-2: oji – Ojibwa
- ISO 639-3: oji – inclusive code – Ojibwa; Individual codes: ojs – Severn Ojibwa ojg – Eastern Ojibwa ojc – Central Ojibwa ojb – Northwestern Ojibwa ojw – Western Ojibwa ciw – Chippewa otw – Ottawa alq – Algonquin
- Glottolog: ojib1241 Ojibwa
- Linguasphere: 62-ADA-d (Ojibwa+Anissinapek)
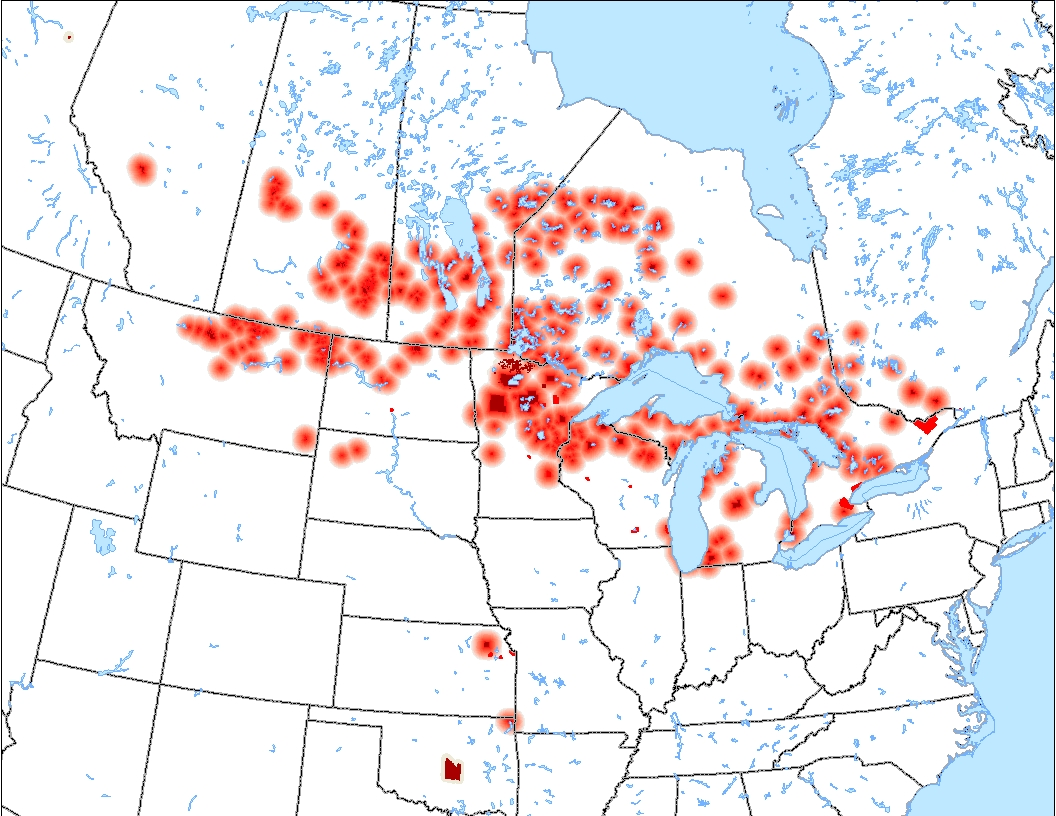
- Location of all Anishinaabe Reservations/Reserves and cities with an Anishinaabe population in North America, with diffusion rings about communities speaking Anishinaabe languages

- Ojibwe is classified as Severely Endangered by the UNESCO Atlas of the World's Languages in Danger.

- Person: Ojibwe ᐅᒋᐺ; Anishinaabe ᐊᓂᔑᓈᐯ
- People: Ojibweg ᐅᒋᐺᒃ / ᐅᒋᐺᐠ; Anishinaabek ᐊᓂᔑᓈᐯᒃ / ᐊᓂᔑᓈᐯᐠ
- Language: Ojibwemowin ᐅᒋᐺᒧᐎᓐ; Anishinaabemowin ᐊᓂᐦᔑᓈᐯᒧᐎᓐ; Hand Talk
- Country: Ojibwewaki ᐅᒋᐻᐘᑭ; Anishinaabewaki ᐊᓂᔑᓈᐯᐘᑭ

Ojibwe (/oʊˈdʒɪbweɪ/ oh-JIB-way), also known as Ojibwa (/oʊˈdʒɪbwə/ oh-JIB-wə), Ojibway, Otchipwe, Ojibwemowin, or Anishinaabemowin, is an indigenous language of North America of the Algonquian language family. The language has various dialects with local names and frequently local writing systems. No single dialect is considered the most prestigious or prominent, and no writing system covers all dialects.

Dialects of Ojibwemowin are spoken in Canada, from southwestern Quebec, through Ontario, Manitoba, and parts of Saskatchewan, with outlying communities in Alberta; and in the United States, from Michigan to Wisconsin and Minnesota, with communities in North Dakota and Montana, as well as groups that were removed to Kansas and Oklahoma by the Indian Removal Act. While there is some variation in the classification of its dialects, at least the following are recognized, from east to west: Algonquin, Eastern Ojibwe, Ottawa (Odawa), Western Ojibwe (Saulteaux), Oji-Cree (Severn Ojibwe), Northwestern Ojibwe, and Southwestern Ojibwe (Chippewa). Based upon contemporary field research, J. R. Valentine also recognizes several other dialects: Berens Ojibwe in northwestern Ontario, which he distinguishes from Northwestern Ojibwe; North of (Lake) Superior; and Nipissing. The latter two cover approximately the same territory as Central Ojibwa, which he does not recognize.

The aggregated dialects of Ojibwemowin comprise the second most commonly spoken First Nations language in Canada (after Cree), and the fourth most widely spoken Native American language in the United States or Canada behind Navajo, the Inuit languages and Cree.

Ojibwemowin is a relatively healthy indigenous language. The Waadookodaading Ojibwe Language Immersion School in Hayward, Wisconsin, teaches children in Ojibwe only. A similar program is in place at Lowell Elementary School in Duluth, Minnesota.

== Classification ==
The Algonquian language family, of which Ojibwemowin is a member, is a branch of the Algic language family. Other non-Algonquian Algic languages include Wiyot and Yurok. Ojibwe is sometimes described as a Central Algonquian language, along with Fox, Cree, Menominee, Miami-Illinois, Potawatomi, and Shawnee. Central Algonquian is a geographical term of convenience rather than a genetic subgroup, and its use does not mean that Central languages are more closely related to each other than to the other Algonquian languages.

=== Exonyms and endonyms ===
The most general Indigenous designation for the language is Anishinaabemowin 'speaking the native language' (Anishinaabe 'native person,' verb suffix –mo 'speak a language,' suffix –win 'nominalizer'), with varying spellings and pronunciations depending upon dialect. Some speakers use the term Ojibwemowin. The general term in Oji-Cree (Severn Ojibwe) is Anihshininiimowin, although Anishinaabemowin is widely recognized by Severn speakers. Some speakers of Saulteaux Ojibwe call their language Nakawemowin. The Ottawa dialect is sometimes called Daawaamwin, but the general designation is Nishnaabemwin, with the latter term also applied to Jibwemwin or Eastern Ojibwe. Other local terms are listed in Ojibwe dialects. English terms include Ojibwe, with variants including Ojibwa and Ojibway. The related term Chippewa is more commonly employed in the United States and in southwestern Ontario among descendants of Ojibwe migrants from the United States.

=== Relationship with Potawatomi ===
Ojibwe and Potawatomi are frequently viewed as being more closely related to each other than to other Algonquian languages. Ojibwe and Potawatomi have been proposed as likely candidates for forming a genetic subgroup within Proto-Algonquian, although the required research to ascertain the linguistic history and status of a hypothetical "Ojibwe–Potawatomi" subgroup has not yet been undertaken. A discussion of Algonquian family subgroups indicates that "Ojibwe–Potawatomi is another possibility that awaits investigation." In a proposed consensus classification of Algonquian languages, Goddard (1996) classifies Ojibwa and Potawatomi as "Ojibwayan", although no supporting evidence is adduced.

The Central languages share a significant number of common features. These features can generally be attributed to diffusion of features through borrowing: "Extensive lexical, phonological, and perhaps grammatical borrowing—the diffusion of elements and features across language boundaries—appears to have been the major factor in giving the languages in the area of the Upper Great Lakes their generally similar cast, and it has not been possible to find any shared innovations substantial enough to require the postulation of a genetically distinct Central Algonquian subgroup."

The possibility that the proposed genetic subgrouping of Ojibwa and Potawatomi can also be accounted for as diffusion has also been raised: "The putative Ojibwa–Potawatomi subgroup is similarly open to question, but cannot be evaluated without more information on Potawatomi dialects."

== History ==
=== Lingua franca ===
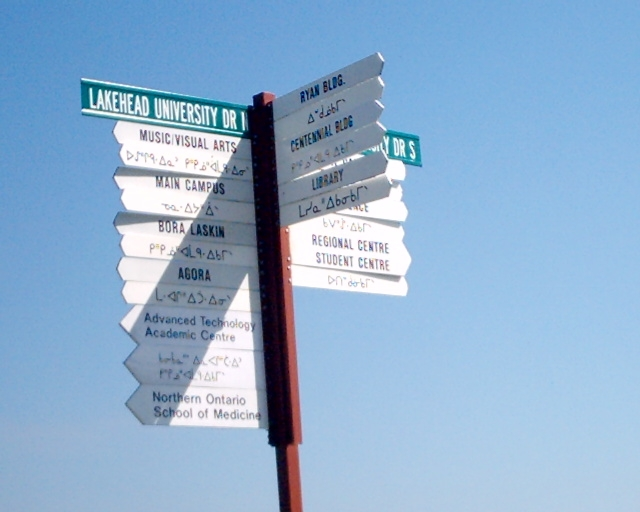
A sign at Lakehead University in English and Ojibwe

Several different Ojibwe dialects have functioned as a lingua franca or trade language in the circum–Great Lakes area, particularly in interactions with speakers of other Algonquian languages. Documentation of such usage dates from the 18th and 19th centuries, but earlier use is likely, with reports as early as 1703 suggesting that Ojibwe was used by different groups from the Gulf of Saint Lawrence to Lake Winnipeg, and from as far south as Ohio to Hudson Bay.

Documentation from the 17th century indicates that the Wyandot language (also called Huron), one of the Iroquoian languages, was also used as a trade language east of the Great Lakes by speakers of the Nipissing and Algonquin dialects of Ojibwe, and also by other groups south of the Great Lakes, including the Winnebago and by a group of unknown affiliation identified only as "Assistaeronon". The political decline of the Hurons in the 18th century and the ascendancy of Ojibwe-speaking groups including the Ottawa led to the replacement of Huron as a lingua franca.

In the area east of Georgian Bay, the Nipissing dialect was a trade language. In the Lower Peninsula of Michigan, the eastern end of the Upper Peninsula, the area between Lake Erie and Lake Huron, and along the north shore of Georgian Bay, the Ottawa dialect served as a trade language. In the area south of Lake Superior and west of Lake Michigan Southwestern Ojibwe was the trade language. A widespread pattern of asymmetrical bilingualism is found in the area south of the Great Lakes in which speakers of Potawatomi or Menominee, both Algonquian languages, also spoke Ojibwe, but Ojibwe speakers did not speak the other languages. It is known that some speakers of Menominee also speak Ojibwe and that the pattern persisted into the 20th century. Similarly, bilingualism in Ojibwe is still common among Potawatomis who speak Potawatomi.

Reports from traders and travellers as early as 1744 indicate that speakers of Menominee, another Algonquian language, used Ojibwe as a lingua franca. Other reports from the 18th century and the early 19th century indicate that speakers of the unrelated Siouan language Ho-Chunk (Winnebago) also used Ojibwe when dealing with Europeans and others. Other reports indicate that agents of the American government at Green Bay, Wisconsin, spoke Ojibwe in their interactions with Menominee, with other reports indicating that "the Chippewa, Menominee, Ottawa, Potawatomi, Sac, and Fox tribes used Ojibwe in intertribal communication". Some reports indicate that farther west, speakers of non-Algonquian languages such as Ho-Chunk (Winnebago), Iowa, and Pawnee spoke Ojibwe as an "acquired language".

=== U.S. government attempt to erase native language ===
In the late 19th century, the American federal Native American boarding school initiative forced Native American children to attend government-run boarding schools in an attempt to "acculturate" them into American society. Often far from their home communities, these schools attempted to cut children's ties had to their native culture and limit their ability to visit home. Students were forced to speak English, cut their hair, dress in uniform, practice Christianity, and learn about European culture and history.

Although the Indian Reorganization Act of 1934 mandated the phasing-out of the Native American boarding school program, youth were still sent to these institutions into the 1960s and '70s. Because children were forced to live away from their home communities, many never had the opportunity to hear and use their native language. This government assimilation effort caused widespread loss of language and culture among indigenous communities, including the Ojibwe people.

=== Language revitalization ===
With the remaining population of native speakers declining as older generations pass away, many historians believe we are at a point in the language's history that will determine whether it proliferates or goes extinct. Ojibwe historian Anton Treuer estimates that there are about 1,000 Ojibwe speakers left in the United States, mostly in Minnesota's Red Lake Indian Reservation and in Mille Lacs region. Teacher of the language Keller Paap believes most fluent speakers in the United States are over 70 years old, limiting exposure to spoken Ojibwemowin in many communities.

Ojibwe educators and scholars across the region are working with elders who speak Ojibwemowin, known as the First Speakers, to document and learn the language in hopes to preserve it and pass it on to another generation. Treuer has been recording stories told by about 50 different Ojibwe elders in their native language to preserve both the language and pieces of knowledge and history. With his mentor, the Ponemah elder Eugene Stillday, he writes the recorded stories in both Ojibwe and translated English.

As of the late 2010s, there has been more of a push toward bringing the Ojibwe language back into more common use, through language classes and programs sponsored by universities, sometimes available to non-students, which are essential to passing on the Ojibwe language. These courses mainly target adults and young adults; however, there are many resources for all age groups, including online games which provide domains for online language use. In the 1980s, The Northern Native-Languages Project was introduced in Ontario to get Indigenous languages such as Ojibwe, to be taught in schools. Years later, the first curriculum was established for the program and it was known as Native Languages 1987. There has also been an increase in published children's literature. The increase in materials published in Ojibwe is essential to increasing the number of speakers. Language revitalization through Ojibwe frameworks also allows for cultural concepts to be conveyed through language.

A 2014 study has indicated that learning Indigenous languages such as Ojibwe in school helps in learning the language and language structure; however, it does not help grow the use of the language outside of a school setting. The most effective way of promoting language is being surrounded by the language, especially in a familial setting. This is difficult to replicate in schools, which is why speaking Ojibwe with family and in one's home life is important in growing language revitalization.

Research has been done in Ojibwe communities to prove the important role language revitalization has in treating health concerns. The use of language connects a community through shared views and supports the well-being of said community. Researchers found that language and the notion of culture were intertwined together instead of being separate concepts, and the people who regularly practiced their language and culture were often associated with more positive health outcomes, particularly for psychological health and mental well-being.

An "Ojibway Language and People" app is an open-source app available for iOS devices. The Ojibwe People's Dictionary is an online language resource created in collaboration with the University of Minnesota. It is an accessible system that allows users to search in English or Ojibwe and includes voice recordings for many of the 17 000 entries in the collection. In 2022 the Mille Lacs Band of Ojibwe announced a partnership with Rosetta Stone to preserve the Ojibwe language and the Mille Lacs dialect through the latter's Endangered Languages Program. As of 2025 three levels of language learning are available.

=== Language immersion schools ===
Despite what they have faced in the American and Canadian governments' attempt to force Ojibwe into language death through the educational system, many indigenous communities across the Great Lakes region are making efforts towards the Ojibwe language revival by similarly using the school system. Largely inspired by the success of Polynesian languages immersion schools in Hawaii and New Zealand, similar school programs have been starting throughout Minnesota and Wisconsin in recent years. One of the most notable programs—developed by Ojibwe educators Lisa LaRonge and Keller Paap—is that of the Waadookodaading Ojibwe Language Immersion School located on the Lac Courte Oreilles Reservation in northern Wisconsin. Most students come from English-speaking homes and are learning Ojibwemowin as their second language. At this school, instructors and elders teach the preschoolers to third graders entirely in the Ojibwe language, so that by the time that students complete kindergarten, they know both English and Ojibwe alphabets and writing systems. In the classroom, students generally first become familiar with the language by hearing and speaking it and then advance to reading and writing it as well. They are taught mathematics, reading, social studies, music, and other typical school subjects through the medium of the Ojibwe language so as to increase student's exposure to Ojibwemowin while providing a well-rounded education. In her research study on Ojibwe immersion schools, Ojibwe scholar and educator Mary Hermes suggests that educating through the Ojibwe language may be more culturally meaningful to communities than simply educating about the culture through English.

The goal, as with many other language immersion schools across the country, is to meet state-mandated standards for curriculum in the native language. This can be a challenge as public education standards are rigorous with curriculum on complex mathematic and scientific concepts occurring at the second and third grade levels. Ojibwe educators at these schools are constantly working with elders so as to design new ways to say lesser-used words in Ojibwe such as plastic or quotient. Because the Ojibwe language is traditionally oral, it is often difficult for educators to find adequate resources to develop the curriculum. Thus, through these school programs, the language is constantly evolving.

Many of these Ojibwe language immersion schools are also considering the question as to whether or not they should include English instruction. Some research suggests that learning to write in one's first language is important prior to learning a second language. Therefore, many schools include some level of English education at certain grade levels.

Along with using the native language, Waadookodaading uses native ways of teaching in its education system. "Ojibwemowin, the Ojibwe language, is a language of action." Therefore, students are encouraged to learn the language by observing and by doing. For example, each spring the students at Waadookodaading participate in a maple sugar harvest. Older students and elders instruct the younger students on the harvest process, narrating what they are doing in Ojibwemowin as the younger students observe. The younger students are then encouraged to participate as they learn, gathering wood, helping to drill trees, and hauling buckets of sap. Thus, the Ojibwe language is kept alive through indigenous methods of teaching, which emphasizes hands-on experiences, such as the sugar bush harvest. The language is then passed on in a similar manner in which it has been throughout history in that older members of the community—including elders/instructors and older students at the schools—relay their knowledge and experiences to the younger generation.

== Geographic distribution ==
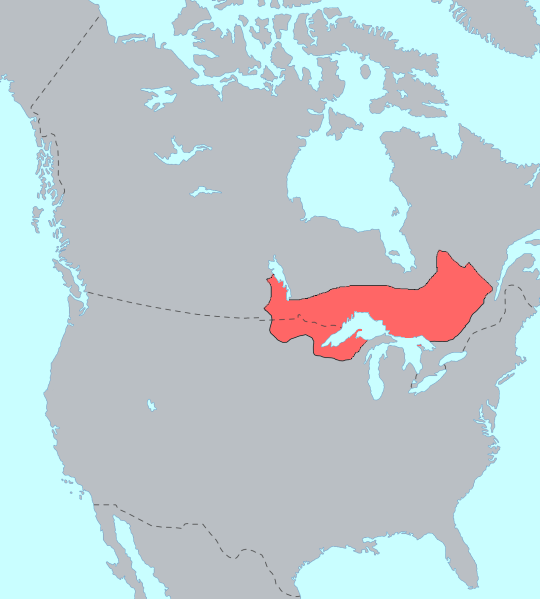

Pre-contact distribution of Ojibwe and its dialects

Ojibwe communities are found in Canada from southwestern Quebec, through Ontario, southern Manitoba and parts of southern Saskatchewan; and in the United States from northern Michigan through northern Wisconsin and northern Minnesota, with a number of communities in northern North Dakota and northern Montana. Groups of speakers of the Ottawa dialect migrated to Kansas and Oklahoma during the historical period, with a small amount of linguistic documentation of the language in Oklahoma. The presence of Ojibwe in British Columbia has been noted.

Current census data indicate that all varieties of Ojibwe are spoken by approximately 56,531 people. This figure reflects census data from the 2000 United States census and the 2006 Canadian census. The Ojibwe language is reported as spoken by a total of 8,791 people in the United States of which 7,355 are Native Americans and by as many as 47,740 in Canada, making it one of the largest Algic languages by numbers of speakers.

Language	Canada (2016)	Canada (2011)	United States	Total (by speakers)	Total ethnic population
Algonquin	1,660	2,680	0	2,680	8,266
Oji-Cree	13,630	12,600	0	12,600	12,600
Ojibwe	20,470	24,896	8,355	33,251	219,711
Ottawa	165	7,564	436	8,000	60,000
Total (by Country)	35,925	47,740	8,791	56,531	300,577

The Red Lake, White Earth, and Leech Lake reservations are known for their tradition of singing hymns in the Ojibwe language. As of 2011, Ojibwe is the official language of Red Lake.

=== Dialects ===
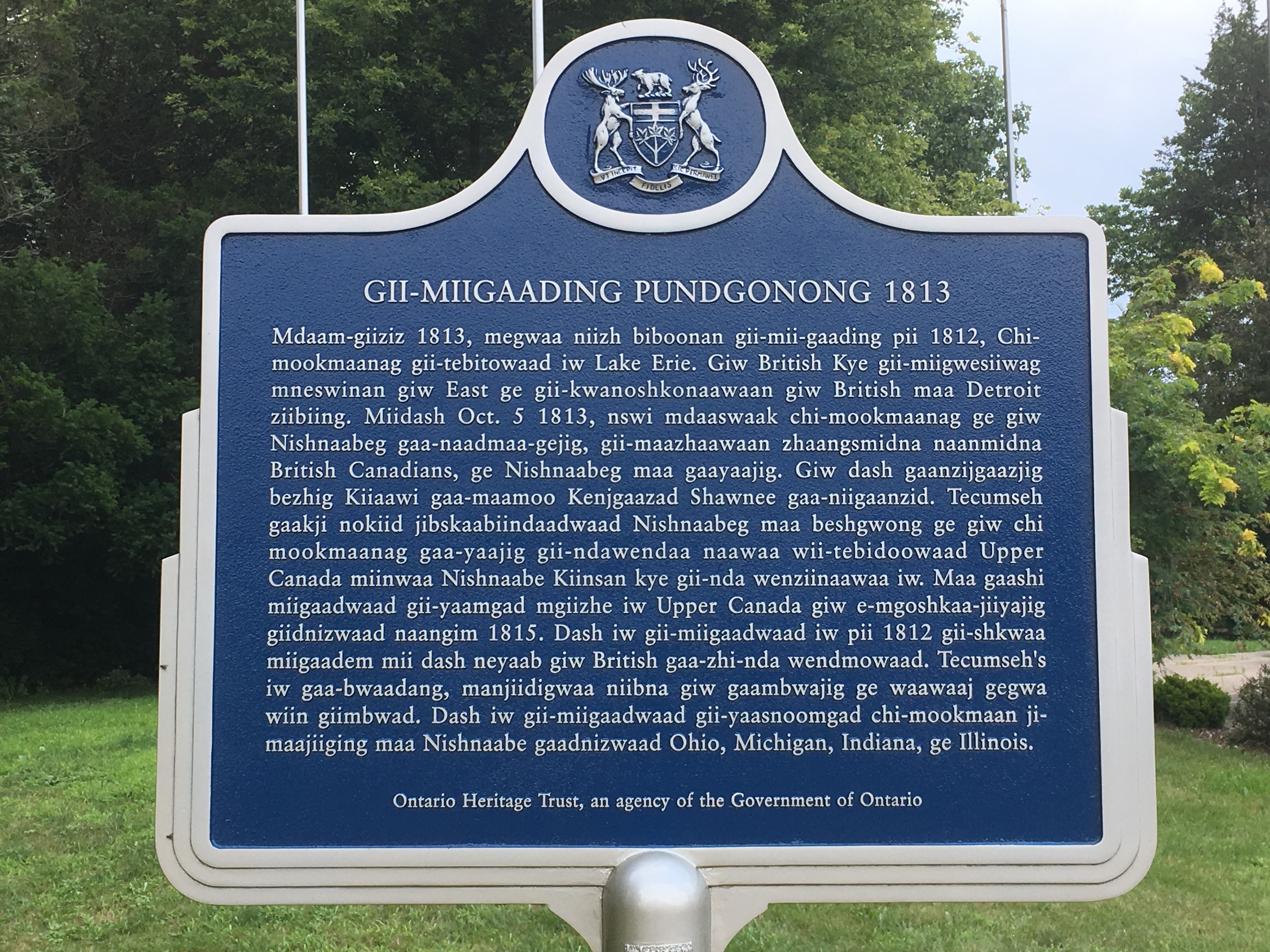
Ontario Heritage Plaque in Ojibwe at the Battle of the Thames historical site

Because the dialects of Ojibwe are at least partly mutually intelligible, Ojibwe is usually considered to be a single language with a number of dialects, i.e. Ojibwe is "... conventionally regarded as a single language consisting of a continuum of dialectal varieties since ... every dialect is at least partly intelligible to the speakers of the neighboring dialects." The degree of mutual intelligibility between nonadjacent dialects varies considerably; recent research has shown that there is strong differentiation between the Ottawa dialect spoken in southern Ontario and northern Michigan; the Severn Ojibwa dialect spoken in northern Ontario and Manitoba; and the Algonquin dialect spoken in southwestern Quebec. Valentine notes that isolation is the most plausible explanation for the distinctive linguistic features found in these three dialects. Many communities adjacent to these relatively sharply differentiated dialects show a mix of transitional features, reflecting overlap with other nearby dialects. While each of these dialects has undergone innovations that make them distinctive, their status as part of the Ojibwe language complex is not in dispute. The relatively low degrees of mutual intelligibility between some nonadjacent Ojibwe dialects led Rhodes and Todd to suggest that Ojibwe should be analyzed as a linguistic subgroup consisting of several languages.

While there is some variation in the classification of Ojibwe dialects, at a minimum the following are recognized, proceeding west to east: Western Ojibwe (Saulteaux), Southwestern Ojibwe (Chippewa), Northwestern Ojibwe, Severn Ojibwe (Oji-Cree), Ottawa (Odawa), Eastern Ojibwe, and Algonquin. Based upon contemporary field research, Valentine also recognizes several other dialects: Berens Ojibwe in northwestern Ontario, which he distinguishes from Northwestern Ojibwe; North of (Lake) Superior; and Nipissing. The latter two cover approximately the same territory as Central Ojibwa, which he does not recognize.

Two recent analyses of the relationships between the Ojibwe dialects are in agreement on the assignment of the strongly differentiated Ottawa dialect to a separate subgroup, and the assignment of Severn Ojibwe and Algonquin to another subgroup, and differ primarily with respect to the relationships between the less strongly differentiated dialects. Rhodes and Todd recognize several different dialectal subgroupings within Ojibwe: (a) Ottawa; (b) Severn and Algonquian; (c) a third subgroup which is further divided into (i) a subgrouping of Northwestern Ojibwe and Saulteaux, and a subgrouping consisting of Eastern Ojibwe and a further subgrouping comprising Southwestern Ojibwe and Central Ojibwe. Valentine has proposed that Ojibwe dialects are divided into three groups: a northern tier consisting of Severn Ojibwe and Algonquin; a southern tier consisting of "Odawa, Chippewa, Eastern Ojibwe, the Ojibwe of the Border Lakes region between Minnesota and Ontario, and Saulteaux; and third, a transitional zone between these two polar groups, in which there is a mixture of northern and southern features."

=== Influence on other languages ===
Michif is a mixed language that primarily is based upon French and Plains Cree, with some vocabulary from Ojibwe, in addition to phonological influence in Michif-speaking communities where there is a significant Ojibwe influence. In locations such as Turtle Mountain, North Dakota individuals of Ojibwe ancestry now speak Michif and Ojibwe. Bungi Creole is an English-based Creole language spoken in Manitoba by the descendants of "English, Scottish, and Orkney fur traders and their Cree or Saulteaux wives ...". Bungee incorporates elements of Cree; the name may be from the Ojibwe word bangii 'a little bit' or the Cree equivalent, but whether there is any other Ojibwe component in Bungee is not documented. Ojibwe borrowings have been noted in Menominee, a related Algonquian language.

== Phonology ==
=== Consonants ===
All dialects of Ojibwe generally have an inventory of 17 consonants. Most dialects have the segment glottal stop /ʔ/ in their inventory of consonant phonemes; Severn Ojibwe and the Algonquin dialect have /h/ in its place. Some dialects have both segments phonetically, but only one is present in phonological representations. The Ottawa and Southwestern Ojibwe (Chippewa) have /h/ in a small number of affective vocabulary items in addition to regular /ʔ/. Some dialects may have otherwise non-occurring sounds such as /f, l, r/ in loanwords.

		Bilabial	Alveolar	Postalveolar and palatal	Velar	Glottal
Nasals		m ⟨m⟩	n ⟨n⟩			
Plosives and affricates	fortis	pʰ ⟨p⟩	tʰ ⟨t⟩	tʃʰ ⟨ch⟩	kʰ ⟨k⟩	ʔ ⟨'⟩
Plosives and affricates	lenis	p ~ b ⟨b⟩	t ~ d ⟨d⟩	tʃ ~ dʒ ⟨j⟩	k ~ ɡ ⟨g⟩	ʔ ⟨'⟩
Fricative	fortis		sʰ ⟨s⟩	ʃʰ ⟨sh⟩		
Fricative	lenis		s ~ z ⟨z⟩	ʃ ~ ʒ ⟨zh⟩		(h ⟨h⟩)
Approximants				j ⟨y⟩	w ⟨w⟩	

Obstruent consonants are divided into lenis and fortis sets, with these features having varying phonological analyses and phonetic realizations cross-dialectally. In some dialects, such as Severn Ojibwe, members of the fortis set are realized as a sequence of /h/ followed by a single segment drawn from the set of lenis consonants: /p t k tʃ s ʃ/. Algonquin Ojibwe is reported as distinguishing fortis and lenis consonants on the basis of voicing, with fortis being voiceless and lenis being voiced. In other dialects fortis consonants are realized as having greater duration than the corresponding lenis consonant, invariably voiceless, "vigorously articulated", and aspirated in certain environments. In some practical orthographies such as the widely used double vowel system, fortis consonants are written with voiceless symbols: p, t, k, ch, s, sh.

Lenis consonants have normal duration and are typically voiced intervocalically. Although they may be devoiced at the end or beginning of a word, they are less vigorously articulated than fortis consonants, and are invariably unaspirated. In the double vowel system, lenis consonants are written with voiced symbols: b, d, g, j, z, zh.

All dialects of Ojibwe have two nasal consonants /m/ and /n/, one labialized velar approximant /w/, one palatal approximant /j/, and either /ʔ/ or /h/.

=== Vowels ===
All dialects of Ojibwe have seven oral vowels. Vowel length is phonologically contrastive and so is phonemic. Although long and short vowels are phonetically distinguished by vowel quality, vowel length is phonologically relevant since the distinction between long and short vowels correlates with the occurrence of vowel syncope, which characterizes the Ottawa and Eastern Ojibwe dialects, as well as word stress patterns in the language.

There are three short vowels /i a o/ and three corresponding long vowels /iː aː oː/ in addition to a fourth long vowel /eː/, which lacks a corresponding short vowel. The short vowel /i/ typically has phonetic values centring on [ɪ]; /a/ typically has values centring on [ə]~[ʌ]; and /o/ typically has values centring on [o]~[ʊ]. Long /oː/ is pronounced [uː] for many speakers, and /eː/ is often [ɛː].

Oral Vowels
	Front	Central	Back	
Close	iː			oː~uː
Near-Close	ɪ		o~ʊ	oː~uː
Mid	eː	ə	o~ʊ	oː~uː
Open		aː		

Ojibwe has nasal vowels. Some arise predictably by rule in all analyses, while other long nasal vowels are of uncertain phonological status. The latter have been analysed as underlying phonemes and/or as predictable and derived by the operation of phonological rules from sequences of a long vowel and /n/ and another segment, typically /j/.

Nasal Vowels
	Front	Central	back
Close	ĩː		õː~ũː
Mid	ẽː		õː~ũː
Open		ãː	

Placement of word stress is determined by metrical rules that define a characteristic iambic metrical foot, in which a weak syllable is followed by a strong syllable. A foot consists of a minimum of one syllable and a maximum of two syllables, with each foot containing a maximum of one strong syllable. The structure of the metrical foot defines the domain for relative prominence, in which a strong syllable is assigned stress because it is more prominent than the weak member of the foot. Typically, the strong syllable in the antepenultimate foot is assigned the primary stress.

Strong syllables that do not receive main stress are assigned at least secondary stress. In some dialects, metrically weak (unstressed) vowels at the beginning of a word are frequently lost. In the Ottawa and Eastern Ojibwe dialects, all metrically weak vowels are deleted. For example, bemisemagak(in) (airplane(s), in the Southwestern Ojibwe dialect) is stressed as [be · m^{i}se · m^{a}gak /ˈbɛːmɪˌseːmʌˌɡak/] in the singular but as [be · m^{i}se · m^{a}ga · kin /ˌbeːmɪˈsɛːmʌˌɡaˌkin/] in the plural. In some other dialects, metrically weak (unstressed) vowels, especially "a" and "i", are reduced to a schwa and depending on the writer, may be transcribed as "i", "e" or "a". For example, anami'egiizhigad [^{a}na · m^{i}'e · gii · zh^{i}gad /əˌnaməˈʔɛːˌɡiːʒəˌɡad/] (Sunday, literally 'prayer day') may be transcribed as anama'egiizhigad in those dialects.

== Grammar ==
The general grammatical characteristics of Ojibwe are shared across its dialects. The Ojibwe language is polysynthetic, exhibiting characteristics of synthesis and a high morpheme-to-word ratio. Ojibwe is a head-marking language in which inflectional morphology on nouns and particularly verbs carries significant amounts of grammatical information.

Word classes include nouns, verbs, grammatical particles, pronouns, preverbs, and prenouns. Preferred word orders in a simple transitive sentence are verb-initial, such as verb–object–subject and verb–subject–object. While verb-final orders are dispreferred, all logically possible orders are attested.

Complex inflectional and derivational morphology play a central role in Ojibwe grammar. Noun inflection and particularly verb inflection indicate a wide variety of grammatical information, realized through the use of prefixes and suffixes added to word stems. Grammatical characteristics include the following:

1. Grammatical gender, divided into animate and inanimate categories
2. extensive head-marking on verbs of inflectional information concerning person
3. number
4. tense
5. modality
6. evidentiality
7. negation
8. a distinction between obviative and proximate third-person, marked on both verbs and nouns.

There is a distinction between two different types of third person: the proximate (the third person deemed more important or in focus) and the obviative (the third person deemed less important or out of focus). Nouns can be singular or plural in number and either animate or inanimate in gender. Separate personal pronouns exist but are used mainly for emphasis; they distinguish inclusive and exclusive first-person plurals.

Verbs, the most complex word class, are inflected for one of three orders (indicative, the default; conjunct, used for participles and in subordinate clauses; and imperative, used with commands), as negative or affirmative, and for the person, number, animacy, and proximate/obviative status of both the subject and object as well as for several different modes (including the dubitative and preterit) and tenses.

== Vocabulary ==
=== Loanwords and neologisms ===
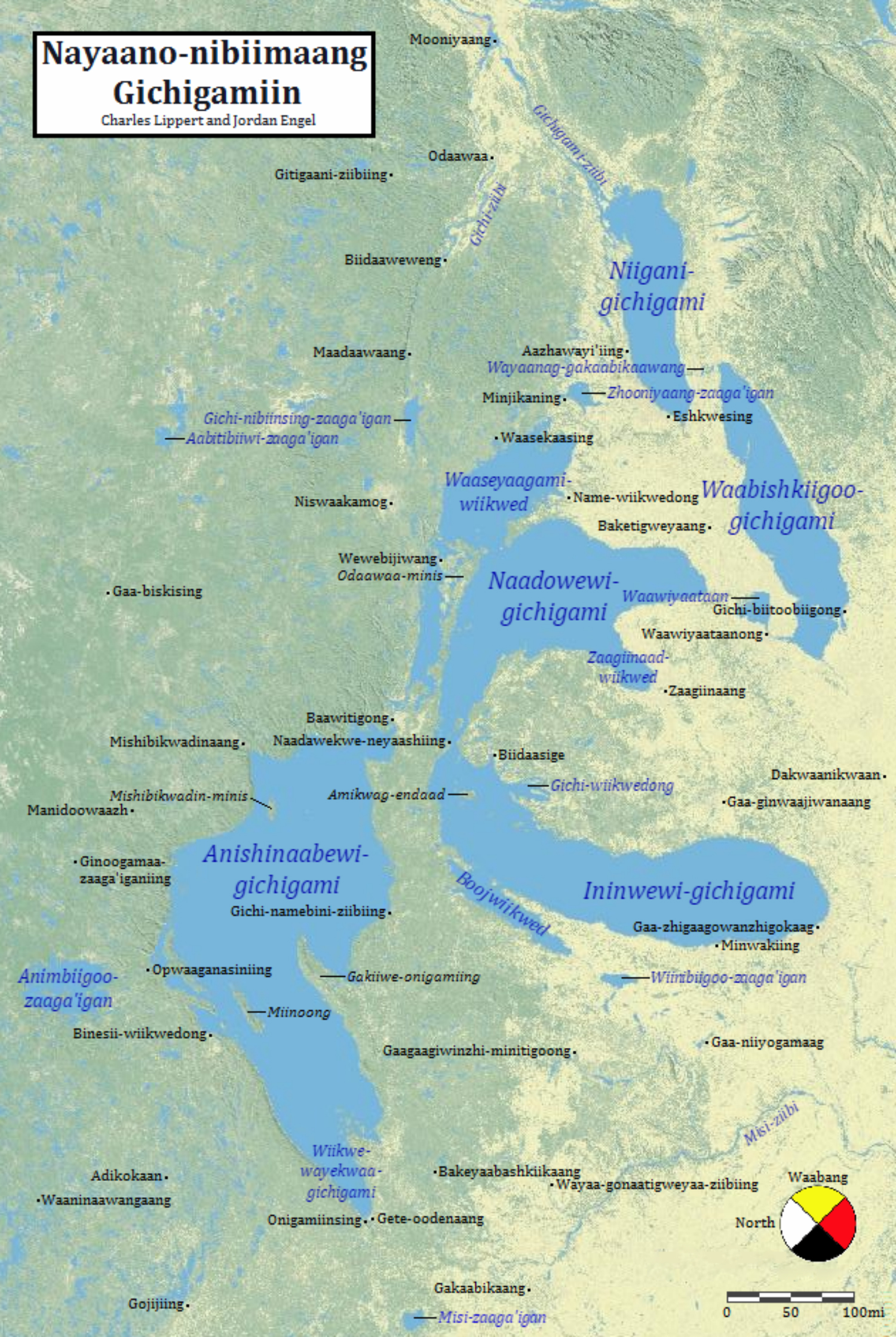
Names of the Great Lakes and surrounding regions in Ojibwe

Although it does contain a few loans from English (e.g. gaapii, 'coffee') and French (e.g. mooshwe, 'handkerchief' (from mouchoir), ni-tii, 'tea' (from le thé, 'the tea'), in general, the Ojibwe language is notable for its relative lack of borrowing from other languages. Instead, speakers far prefer to create words for new concepts from existing vocabulary. For example, in Minnesota Ojibwemowin, 'airplane' is bemisemagak, literally 'thing that flies' (from bimisemagad, 'to fly'), and 'battery' is ishkode-makakoons, literally 'little fire-box' (from ishkode, 'fire', and makak, 'box'). Even 'coffee' is called makade-mashkikiwaaboo ('black liquid-medicine') by many speakers, rather than gaapii. These new words vary from region to region, and occasionally from community to community. For example, in Northwest Ontario Ojibwemowin, 'airplane' is ombaasijigan, literally 'device that gets uplifted by the wind' (from ombaasin, 'to be uplifted by the wind') as opposed to the Minnesota bemisemagak.

=== Dialect variation ===
Like any language dialects spanning vast regions, some words that may have had identical meaning at one time have evolved to have different meanings today. For example, zhooniyaans (literally 'small [amount of] money' and used to refer to coins) specifically means 'dime' (10-cent piece) in the United States, but a 'quarter' (25-cent piece) in Canada, or desabiwin (literally 'seat') means 'couch' or 'chair' in Canada, but is used to specifically mean 'saddle' in the United States.

Cases like 'battery' and 'coffee' also demonstrate the often great difference between the literal meanings of the individual morphemes in a word, and the overall meaning of the entire word.

=== Sample vocabulary ===
Below are some examples of common Ojibwe words.

Short list of intransitive verbs:

- waabi 'he/she sees'
- noondam 'he/she hears'
- bimose 'he/she walks'
- bangishin 'he/she falls'
- onjibaa 'he/she comes'
- izhaa 'he/she goes'
- biindige 'he/she comes in'
- maajaa 'he/she leaves'
- dagoshin 'he/she is arriving'
- giiwe 'he/she goes home'
- bakade 'he/she is hungry'
- gaasikanaabaagawe 'he/she is thirsty'
- mino'endamo 'he/she is glad'
- gashkendamo 'he/she is sad'
- zhaaganaashimo 'he/she speaks English'
- ojibwemo 'he/she speaks Ojibwe'
- aadizooke 'he/she tells a myth'
- wiisini 'he/she eats'
- minikwe 'he/she drinks'
- boogidi 'he/she farts'
- jiibaakwe 'he/she cooks'
- zagaswe 'he/she smokes'
- nibaa 'he/she sleeps'
- giigoonyike 'he/she is fishing' (lit. 'he/she makes fish')
- bimaadizi 'he/she is alive'
- nibo 'he/she is dead'

Short list of nouns:

- bemaadizid 'person'
- bemaadizijig 'people'
- ikwe 'woman'
- inini 'man'
- ikwezens 'girl'
- gwiiwizens 'boy'
- mitig 'tree'
- asemaa 'tobacco'
- opwaagan 'pipe'
- mandaamin 'corn'
- miskwi 'blood'
- shkiinzhig 'eye'
- tawag 'ear'
- doon 'mouth'
- ninj 'hand, finger'
- de' 'heart'
- doodoosh 'breast'
- doodooshaaboo 'milk'
- doodooshaaboo-bimide 'butter'
- doodooshaaboowi-miijim 'cheese'
- naboob 'soup'
- manoomin 'wild rice'
- omanoominiig 'Menomonee peoples'
- giigoonh 'fish'
- miskwimin 'raspberry'
- day 'dog, horse'
- gekek 'hawk'
- gookooko'oo 'owl'
- migizi 'bald eagle'
- giniw 'golden eagle'
- makizin 'moccasin, shoe'
- wiigiwaam 'wigwam, house'

== Writing system ==
There is no standard writing system used for all Ojibwe dialects. Local alphabets have been developed by adapting the Latin script, usually based on English or French orthography. A syllabic writing system, not related to English or French writing, is used by some Ojibwe speakers in northern Ontario and Manitoba. Great Lakes Algonquian syllabics are based on the French alphabet with letters organized into syllables. It was used primarily by speakers of Fox, Potawatomi, and Winnebago, but there is some indirect evidence of use by speakers of Southwestern Ojibwe.

A widely used Roman character-based writing system is the double vowel system devised by Charles Fiero. Although there is no standard orthography, the double vowel system is used by many Ojibwe language teachers because of its ease of use. A wide range of materials have been published in the system, including a grammar, dictionaries, collections of texts, and pedagogical grammars. In northern Ontario and Manitoba, Ojibwe is most commonly written using the Cree syllabary, a syllabary originally developed by Methodist missionary James Evans around 1840 to write Cree. The syllabic system is based in part on Evans' knowledge of Pitman's shorthand and his prior experience developing a distinctive alphabetic writing system for Ojibwe in southern Ontario.

=== Double vowel system ===
The double vowel system uses three short vowels, four long vowels, and eighteen consonants, represented with the following Roman letters:

a aa b ch d e g h ' i ii j k m n o oo p s sh t w y z zh

Dialects typically either have /h/ or /ʔ/ (the orthographic ⟨'⟩ in most versions) but rarely both. This system is called "double vowel" because the long vowel correspondences to the short vowels ⟨a⟩, ⟨i⟩ and ⟨o⟩ are written with a doubled value. In this system, the nasal ny as a final element is instead written ⟨nh⟩. The allowable consonant clusters are ⟨mb⟩, ⟨nd⟩, ⟨ng⟩, ⟨n'⟩, ⟨nj⟩, ⟨nz⟩, ⟨ns⟩, ⟨nzh⟩, ⟨sk⟩, ⟨shp⟩, ⟨sht⟩, and ⟨shk⟩.

== Notable speakers ==
Notable speakers of Anishinaabemowin include:

- Frederic Baraga (19th century Roman Catholic priest, missionary, and first bishop of the Roman Catholic Diocese of Marquette, who wrote A theoretical and practical grammar of the Otchipwe language)
- Alonzo Barnard (missionary, who operated a printing press to print Ojibwe language educational and religious material)
- George Copway (chief, missionary, writer, cultural ambassador)
- Basil H. Johnston (educator, curator, essayist, cultural ambassador)
- Peter Jones (missionary, reverend, chief)
- Maude "Naawakamigookwe" Kegg (narrator, artist, cultural ambassador)
- Margaret Noodin (educator, writer)
- Jim Northrup (writer)
- Keller Paap (educator and author)
- Francis Xavier Pierz (19th century Roman Catholic priest, poet, and missionary to the Ojibwe in Michigan, Wisconsin, Minnesota, and Ontario)
- Anton Treuer (historian, author, linguistic professor, first Ojibwe person to graduate from Princeton University)
- Archie Mosay (medicine man and elder, mentor of Anton Treuer)
- Anna Gibbs (well-known Ponemah elder, story-teller, and spiritual and ceremonial leader)
- Wab Kinew (Premier of Manitoba, first Indigenous person to hold this office since John Norquay)

== See also ==
- Broken Oghibbeway – Pidgin language
- Canadian Aboriginal syllabics – Writing systems for indigenous North American languages
- List of endangered languages in the United States
- Lists of languages
- Ojibwe grammar – Grammar of the Ojibwe language
- Ojibwe phonology
- Ojibwe writing systems – Writing system
