= Kathleen R. Johnson =

Native American geoscientist

Kathleen Johnson
- Title: Associate Professor

Academic background
- Education: University of Michigan (B.S.) and University of California, Berkeley (PhD)
- Thesis: A Multi-Proxy Speleothem Record of Asian Monsoon Variability during the Late Pleistocene from Wanxiang Cave, Gansu Province, China (2004)
- Doctoral advisor: Lynn Ingram

Academic work
- Discipline: Geology, Paleoclimatology, Cave Science, Earth Science
- Institutions: University of California, Irvine
- Website: sites.uci.edu/johnsonlab/kathleen-johnson/

Kathleen R. Johnson is an American member of the Grand Traverse Band of Ottawa and Chippewa Indians who is a geologist and paleoclimatologist. Her research focuses on reconstructing past climate change with speleothems, on active cave monitoring to understand the interaction of climate with speleotherm geochemistry, and analyzes climate and paleoclimate data to investigate natural climate variability. She earned a PhD from the University of California Berkeley in 2004 and is an associate professor at the University of California Irvine.

== Education ==
Johnson earned her PhD in Geology from University of California, Berkeley with Lynn Ingram in 2004. She received her BS in Geological Sciences from the University of Michigan in 1992. After earning her PhD she was a post-doctoral research fellow at the University of Oxford from 2004-2007 with a Gary Comer Abrupt Climate Change Fellowship.

== Career ==
Johnson joined the faculty of the University of California Irvine in 2007, and is a tenured Associate Professor in the School of Physical Sciences. She leads the Johnson Lab in the Department of Earth System Science, with a focus on paleoclimate research. She is an expert in paleoclimate and hydrology, with research on the history of California droughts, Asian monsoons, and northern Mexico.

Dr. Kathleen R. Johnson's research focuses on using geochemical variations in speleothems (cave formations) to reconstruct past climate changes. She studies how temperature and rainfall influence isotopic and trace-element compositions in stalagmites, combining modern cave monitoring with fossil speleothem analysis. Her work aims to create high-resolution climate reconstructions from regions like Laos, Vietnam, and Mexico, helping to understand major climate systems like the Asian monsoon and El Niño-Southern Oscillation.

Johnson advocates for more Native American students to have careers in STEM, particularly geoscience, to address environmental challenges. Johnson was the Principal Investigator and director of the American Indian Summer Institute in Earth System Science, a residential summer program for high school students hosted at UC Irvine. The program was established in 2011 by Johnson and the American Indian Resource Program staff at UC Irvine with grant funding of more than $1M from the US National Science Foundation before ending in 2017. In 2016, the program had 129 participants from over 50 tribes. During the 2016 Bromery Award ceremony, she said:

"...Native Americans are the most underrepresented of all ethnic minorities in the earth sciences....while I strongly value and love my paleoclimate and geochemistry research, I can truly say that it is my work with Native youth that has provided me with the most joy and hope for the future of our planet."

== Awards and honors ==
- Outstanding Contributions to Undergraduate Education, School of Physical Sciences, University of California Irvine, 2010 and 2012
- Chancellor’s Award for Excellence in Fostering Undergraduate Research, University of California Irvine, 2013
- Geological Society of America Bromery Award for Minorities, 2016
- Fellow of the Geological Society of America
- 2018-2019 UCI Inclusive Excellence Spirit Award for “UCI Natural Reserves and Building Relationships with Native Nations as Kuuyam (guests) on Indigenous Homelands.”
- College-Level Promotion of Education Award, 2018 Women of Color in STEM Conference, Career Communications Group, Inc.
- 2017-2018 UCI Inclusive Excellence Spirit Award for “Cultivating Consciousness in Acjachemen and Tongva Homelands”
- 2016 Bromery Award for Minorities, Geological Society of America (Sept. 25th, 2016)
- Chancellor’s Award for Excellence in Fostering Undergraduate Research, University of California, Irvine. (May 18, 2013).
- Gary Comer Abrupt Climate Change Foundation Fellowship. (August 2004 - June 2007).
- Graduate Student Research Grant, Geological Society of America. (2002).
- Scholarship in Geochronology, Berkeley Geochronology Center. (1999 - 2002).

== Published works ==
Johnson's Google Scholar page: https://scholar.google.com/citations?user=vhy8SzUAAAAJ&hl=en
