= Ottawa phonology =

Dialect of the Ojibwe language

Ottawa (also spelled Odawa) is a dialect of the Ojibwe language spoken in a series of communities in southern Ontario and a smaller number of communities in northern Michigan. Ottawa has a phonological inventory of seventeen consonants and seven oral vowels; in addition, there are long nasal vowels the phonological status of which are discussed below. An overview of general Ojibwa phonology and phonetics can be found in the article on Ojibwe phonology. The Ottawa writing system described in Modern orthography is used to write Ottawa words, with transcriptions in the International Phonetic Alphabet (IPA) used as needed.

Significant innovations in Ottawa phonology differentiate it from other dialects of Ojibwe. It is characterized by a pervasive pattern of vowel syncope, by which short vowels are completely deleted or in certain circumstances reduced to schwa [ə], when they appear in metrically defined Weak syllables. The notable effects of Syncope are:

1. Syncope increases the distinctiveness of Ottawa relative to other dialects of Ojibwe, as syncope makes the pronunciation and representation of many Ottawa words significantly different from those of other dialects of Ojibwe.
2. By deleting short vowels between consonants, syncope also creates new consonant clusters that do not occur in other dialects of Ojibwe.
3. In some cases, syncope results in further adjustments in the pronunciation of consonant sequences
4. Syncope has also resulted in new forms of the person prefixes that occur on nouns and verbs.
5. Syncope has increased the amount of variability in the pronunciation of words that contains vowels subject to syncope, as speakers frequently have more than one way of pronouncing person prefixes and words.

== Consonants ==
Consonants are written using the conventional symbol from the Ottawa writing system, with the symbol from the International Phonetic Alphabetic (IPA) following where the two vary.

Ottawa Consonants
		Bilabial	Dental / Alveolar	(Alveolo-) palatal	Velar	Glottal
Nasal		m	n			
Stop	lenis	b	d	j [dʒ]	g [ɡ]	h [ʔ]
Stop	fortis	p [pːʰ]	t [tːʰ]	ch [tʃː]	k [kːʰ]	h [ʔ]
Fricative	lenis		z	zh [ʒ]		
Fricative	fortis		s [sː]	sh [ʃː]		
Approximant				y [j]	w	

The stop, fricative, and affricate consonants are divided into two sets, conventionally referred to as Fortis and Lenis, or equivalently 'Strong' and 'Weak.' Each fortis consonant is matched with a corresponding lenis consonant with the same place of articulation and manner of articulation.

The fortis consonants (p, t, k, ch, s, sh) are invariably voiceless and phonetically long. The stops are also aspirated in most positions: [pːʰ], [tːʰ], [kːʰ], [tʃːʰ], but unaspirated after another consonant.

Fortis consonants
	Fortis aspirated			Fortis unspirated		
Sound	Phonetic	Word	Gloss	Phonetic	Word	Gloss
p	[pːʰ]	pin	'potato'	[p]	shpaa	'high'
t	[tːʰ]	tawag	'ear'	[t]	shtigwaan	'head'
k	[kːʰ]	kik	'kettle'	[k]	dooskon	'elbow'

The lenis consonants (b, d, g, j, z, zh) are typically voiced intervocalically and word-initially before a vowel but are devoiced in word-final position. They are also often subject to other phonological processes when adjacent to fortis consonants.

A number of consonants occur only in loanwords from English: f, r, l.

The labialized stop consonants [ɡʷ] and [kʷ] also occur in the speech of some speakers. Labialization is not normally indicated, but a subscript dot is utilized in Rhodes (1985a), a dictionary of Ottawa and Eastern Ojibwe, to mark labialization: ɡ̣taaji ('s/he is afraid') and aaḳzi ('s/he is sick.')

The contrast between fortis and lenis consonants has been interpreted as a distinction between geminate and non-geminate consonants. However, it has also been argued that Ottawa fortis consonants should be analysed as consonant clusters. In support of this analysis, Ottawa fortis consonants correspond to clusters of /h/ followed by a lenis consonant in the dialects of northwestern Ontario, and the fortis consonants are descended from sequences of consonants in Proto-Algonquian, the reconstructed ancestor language from which Ojibwe and its dialects descend.

== Vowels ==
Ottawa has seven oral vowel sounds, four long and three short. The long vowels ii, oo, aa are paired with the corresponding short vowels i, o, a. The long e has no corresponding short vowel. The phonological distinction between long vowels and short vowels plays a significant role in Ottawa phonology. Only short vowels can be metrically Weak and hence candidates for Syncope. Similarly long vowels are invariably metrically Strong and are never deleted.

The table gives the orthographic symbol and the primary phonetic values for each vowel.

Oral vowels
	Front	Back
Close	⟨ii⟩ [iː]	
Close	⟨i⟩ [ɪ]	
Mid	⟨e⟩ [eː]	⟨oo⟩ [oː]~[uː]
Mid		⟨o⟩ [ʊ]~[ə]
Open		⟨aa⟩ [ɑː]
Open		⟨a⟩ [ə]~[ɑ]

There are also four nasal vowels, often occurring in the final syllable of nouns with diminutive suffixes or words with a diminutive connotation; orthographically the long vowel is followed by word-final ⟨nh⟩ to indicate that the vowel is nasal, but the use of ⟨h⟩ is an orthographic convention and does not correspond to an independent segment. Some analyses treat the long nasal vowels as phonemic, while others treat them as derived by rule from sequences of long vowel followed by /nj/. Nichols (1980), in his study of the related Southwestern Ojibwa dialect spoken in Minnesota describes the status of the analogous vowels as unclear, noting that while the distribution of the long nasal vowels is restricted, there is a minimal pair giiwe ('s/he goes home' and giiwenh ('so the stories goes'). Other presentations of Ojibwe phonology are silent on the issue.

Nasal Vowels
Nasal Vowel	Example	English
iinh	kiwenziinh	'old man'
	wesiinh	'(small) animal'
enh	mdimooyenh	'old woman'
	nzhishenh	'my uncle'
aanh	bnaajaanh	'nestling'
oonh	zhashkoonh	'muskrat'
	boodoonh	'polliwog, tadpole'

Ottawa also has nasalized vowels that arise from combinations of a vowel and a nasal consonant followed by a fricative. These secondarily nasal vowels are predictable and are not part of the Ottawa inventory of vowel phonemes.

== Phonological processes ==
=== Vowel syncope ===
Ottawa (and Eastern Ojibwa) are characterized by a pervasive pattern of vowel syncope, whereby short vowels are completely deleted or in certain circumstances reduced to schwa [ə], when they appear in metrically defined Weak syllables, discussed below. Syncope sharply distinguishes Ottawa and Eastern Ojibwa from other dialects of Ojibwe, although related patterns of syncope primarily affecting word-initial syllables have also been recorded for Ojibwe communities along the north shore of Lake Superior, between Thunder Bay and Sault Ste. Marie.

Syncope has had far-reaching effects in Ottawa, resulting in significant changes in the pronunciation and representation of words, prefixes, and suffixes, and increasing the distinctiveness of Ottawa relative to other dialects of Ojibwe. Syncope has also resulted in the introduction of new forms for person prefixes on nouns and verbs, and the deletion of vowels between consonants has resulted in new secondary consonant sequences, which in some cases results in further adjustments in the pronunciation of consonant sequences. Syncope has increased the amount of variability in the pronunciation of words that contains vowels subject to Syncope.

The patterns of syncope are not new in Ottawa, and are attested in the Ottawa material that linguist Leonard Bloomfield recorded in the late 1930s from Andrew Medler, an Ottawa speaker originally from Michigan who spent most of his life at Walpole Island. Although reduction and syncope effects in Walpole Island Ottawa were noted in Bloomfield (1958), and treated by him as vowel reduction, the situation was not identical in all Ottawa materials collected in approximately the same period. Material collected by Bloomfield in 1941 from Ottawa speaker Angeline Williams, then residing at Sugar Island, Michigan, east of Sault Ste. Marie show no sign of Syncope. Williams was born at Manistique, Michigan in 1872. As well, material collected by C. F. Voegelin from Ottawa speaker Gregor McGregor of Birch Island, Ontario (immediately north of Manitoulin Island) shows only a very limited amount of Syncope. McGregor was born in 1869.

Syncope is also sociolinguistically complex in terms of the way it is realized by different speakers of Ottawa, as distinct patterns have been noted that involve age grading and regional variation within Ottawa-speaking territory. Rhodes (1976) notes that for older speakers, in particular at Manitoulin Island, deletion of short vowels is "…a kind of casual speech phenomena, and the vowels can be easily resupplied (with only some ambiguity of quality)." By comparison, for younger speakers and for older speakers elsewhere, such as the Lower Peninsula of Michigan, deletion of short vowels is categorical.

The Potawatomi language also has rules that affect short vowels, reducing them to schwa [ə] and also deleting them under conditions similar to Ottawa. The Potawatomi phenomena were recorded as early as the 1830s, whereas Ottawa materials from the same period do not show any signs of vowel reduction or deletion. The rise of extensive Syncope in Ottawa may be a substratum effect related to the migration of Potawatomi speakers to Ottawa-speaking communities in southern Ontario in the late nineteenth century.

Distinct unrelated patterns of syncope in more restricted contexts are also found in northern dialects, in particular Severn Ojibwa and Algonquin.

==== Basic pattern ====
In the following table, differences in pronunciation between non-syncopating varieties of Ojibwa and the syncopating Ottawa and Eastern Ojibwa are shown.

Syncope in Ottawa
English	Non-Syncopating Dialects	Syncopating Dialects
the native language	Anishinaabemowin	Nishnaabemwin
Ottawa	Odaawaa	Daawaa
mosquito	zagime	zgime
shoe	makizin	mkizin
pipe (for smoking)	opwaagan	pwaagan
man	inini	nini

==== Metrical feet and syllable weight ====
Ojibwe syllables are organized into metrical feet. A Foot consists of a minimum of one syllable and a maximum of two syllables. Syllables are either Weak or Strong. Each foot contains no more one than one Strong syllable. Taken together, the metrical Foot in combination with weak and strong syllables define the domain for relative prominence, in which a Strong syllable is more prominent than the weak member of the foot. The following summarizes material in Valentine (2001).

Syllable weight plays a significant role in Ottawa phonology and determines stress placement and syncope. Several general principles determine syllable weight.

Assignment of syllable weight starts at the left edge of a word and proceeds left to right.

1. All syllables containing long vowels are strong.
2. Counting left to right from the beginning of the word, in a sequence of two or more syllables containing short vowels the odd-numbered syllable is Weak and the even-numbered syllable is strong.
3. The final syllable of a word is always strong.

Possible feet are listed below. The first two-foot types are iambic, alternating weak-strong.

Weak-Strong (both syllables have short vowels): asin ('stone')
Weak-Strong (first vowel short, second vowel long): apii ('time when')
Strong (long vowel not preceded by a metrically Weak short vowel): jiimaan (both syllables strong)
Strong (long vowel in last syllable of a word, vowel length irrelevant): waagosh ('fox')

Weak vowels are subject to syncope.

==== Alternations in syllable weight ====
Addition of inflectional prefixes or suffixes can change the syllable weight assignment of a word. As a result, a short vowel may be exempt from Syncope because it is in a metrically Strong syllable in one form of a word, but may be eligible for Syncope because the addition of a prefix or suffix changes the syllable weight of the same syllable in a related form of the word.

In a word such as Ojibwa makizin ('shoe') (in non-syncopating dialects) the first two syllables are Weak and Strong, respectively (by rule 3 above), while the final syllable is Strong (by rule 2).

In Ottawa, the first vowel is deleted: mkizin.

The personal prefix /ni-/ ('first person') can be added to a noun such as makizin: nimakizin ('my shoe'). The first two syllables are then Weak and Strong respectively, and the third and fourth syllables are also Weak and Strong respectively. Because the first and third syllables are weak, they are deleted in this word in Ottawa: nmakzin. Hence in the form of the word without a prefix the first vowel ⟨a⟩ is deleted because it is in a Weak syllable; in the form with the person prefix the same vowel is in a Strong syllable and is not deleted.

Similarly, the same noun can also occur with the inanimate plural suffix /-an/, as in General Ojibwe makizinan ('shoes'). In this word the metrical structure is Weak-Strong Weak-Strong. In the Ottawa form the first and third vowels are deleted: mkiznan. The vowel that was in the final Strong syllable in the singular form makizin and hence exempt from syncope is now in a Weak syllable because of the following suffix, and is eligible for deletion.

The Ojibwe word 'my shoes' (non-syncopating dialects) has both the personal prefix and the plural suffix: nimakizinan. In this five-syllable word the metrical structure is Weak-Strong Weak-Strong Strong. The first and third syllables are metrically weak and are deleted in Ottawa: nmakzinan.

In the table below 'W' represents Weak syllables and 'S' represents Strong syllables. An asterisk (*) represents the boundary between Feet.

Syllable Weight in Ottawa
English	Non-Syncopating Dialects	Metrical Structure	Ottawa Pronunciation
shoe	makizin	W S * S	mkizin
my shoe	nimakizin	W S * W S	nmakzin
shoes	makizinan	W S * W S	mkiznan
my shoes	nimakizinan	W S * W S * S	nmakzinan

The basic form of a noun or verb word without any inflectional prefixes or suffixes is referred to as the stem.

The interaction between the combinations of prefixes and suffixes and Syncope results in the Ottawa word stem for 'shoe' having three different shapes or allomorphs where other non-syncopating dialects have only one allomorph for this word stem.

==== Vowels in invariably weak syllables ====
In some cases a short vowel in a word may be metrically Weak in a particular variant of a word (and hence deleted) or it may be metrically strong and hence retained. However, in certain words a short vowel may be in a position where it would always be Weak and therefore always deleted. For such words, it cannot be deduced from synchronic Ottawa language material which of the short vowels /i, a, o/ was present in the historical pre-Syncope form of the word. Here, the quality of the vowel can only be determined by examining the form of the word in other dialects of Ojbwe that have not been affected by Syncope, or by referring to earlier sources for Ottawa, such as Baraga's late nineteenth-century dictionary. For example, the Ottawa word naawkwe ('be midday') originally had a vowel between the first w and k. In other dialects this word has the form naawakwe. In Ottawa, however, for the majority of speakers the short vowel a is never realized and for these speakers there is no reason to believe that the vowel is present in any representation of the word; hence the underlying representation of the word is different for Ottawa speakers.

=== Secondary consonant clusters ===
Syncope creates secondary consonant clusters that are distinguished from consonant clusters that occur in all Ojibwe dialects. Secondary clusters are subject to a range of adjustments.

Syncope affects sequences of the form /CVC.../ (Consonant Vowel Consonant) by deleting the Weak vowel, creating a secondary cluster of the form [CC...]. The affected consonants may be identical or different.

==== Word-internal secondary clusters ====
1. Neutralization of Lenis Stops Before a Nasal.

The lenis stops b, d, g before a nasal consonant may optionally be realized as the corresponding nasal consonant m, n, ŋ, although g is the least likely to undergo this shift.

Optional Assimilation to Following Nasal
English	Non-Syncopating	Ottawa (no assimilation)	Ottawa (with optional assimilation)
much	niibina	niibna	niimna
right (direction)	debini-	debni	demni
tell someone	wiindamawaad	wiindmawaad	wiinnmawaad / wiinmawaad

2. Neutralization of Lenis Consonants Before a Fortis Consonant.
Lenis consonants (b, d, g, z, zh) occurring before a homorganic fortis consonant (p, t, k, s, zh) are deleted. The examples cited below have fortis fricative consonants as the second element in the consonant sequence. Other examples include bp → p; dt → t; gk → k.

Consonant Neutralization
English	Reduced Cluster	Non-Syncopating	Ottawa (with reduction)
it's not sweet	zs → s	wiishkobizisii	wiishkpisii
right (direction)	zhsh → sh	onizhishin	nishin
miss someone	ds → s	medas-	nmesinaa

==== Word-initial secondary clusters ====
Secondarily-arising word-initial consonant clusters reflect a pattern of Reduplication of verb roots that forms many Ottawa words. This pattern has been effectively eliminated in Ottawa through the restructuring of these consonant clusters.

3. Neutralization of Initial Nasal / Approximant Consonants Before a Homorganic Nasal / Approximant Consonant.
Word-initial sequences of two identical nasal consonants or w are normally reduced to a single consonant; pronunciations with doubled consonants are rare.

Reduction of Word-Initial Consonants
English	Reduced Cluster	Non-Syncopating	Ottawa (with reduction)
sit around	nn → n	nanaamad-	naamdabid
have big feet	mm → m	mamaangizided	maangzided
take a seat	ww → w	wawenabi-	wenbi

4. Neutralization of Word-Initial Identical Lenis Consonants

Sequences of word-initial lenis consonants (b, d, g, z, zh) are reduced in two slightly different patterns. In the first, a sequence of two identical lenis fricatives is reduced to a single consonant.

Reduction of Identical Word-Initial Fricative Clusters
English	Reduced Cluster	Non-Syncopating	Ottawa (with reduction)
sit and watch something	zz → s	zizaabam-	saabmaad
paint / spread something	zhzh → sh	zhizhoo’-	shoohang

In the second pattern, in a sequence of two identical lenis stops, the consonant cluster is variably realized as (i) a sequence of two lenis stops; (ii) the corresponding fortis stop, or (iii) a single lenis stop.

Reduction of Identical Word-Initial Stop Clusters
English	Reduced Cluster	Non-Syncopating	Ottawa (with reduction)
winter	bb → bb, p, b	biboon	bboon, poon, boon
open one's mouth	dd → dd, t, d	dadaawan-	ddawnid, taawnid, daawnid
ask someone	gg → gg, k, g	gagwejim-	ggwejmaad, kwejmaad, gwejmaad

=== Palatalization of consonants ===
Alveolar consonants t, d, and sometimes n (only those from Proto-Algonquian *θ were subject) and s, were palatalized to ch, j, zh, and sh respectively before original i or ii.

English	Palatalized Consonant	Non-Syncopating	Ottawa (with reduction)
come driving	d → j	biid-i-bizo	biijbizo
grow to such extent	t → ch	apiit-i-gi	piichgi
fly in such direction	n → zh	in-ikaazo	zhinkaazo

=== Variable /i/ and /a/ in initial syllables ===
Weak short /i/ is also realized as /a/ in certain words in the initial syllable of noun or verb stems. This phenomenon is prominent in the material collected from Angeline Williams by Bloomfield cited above, and also occurs in the Ottawa material in Baraga (1878). These data sets do not reflect Ottawa Syncope. Although this alternation also occurs in other dialects, it is most widespread in earlier Ottawa. There does not appear to be a general phonological conditioning factor for this variation, which arguably is determined lexically, i.e. on a word by word basis.

Ottawa Alternation of /i/ and /a/
English	Other Dialects	Williams (1941)
woman	ikwe	akwe
hard maple tree	ininaatig	aninaatig
fire	ishkode	ashkode
that over there	iwedi	awedi
those (animate plural)	igiw	agiw
ball	bikwaakwad	bakwaakwad

== See also ==
- Ojibwe dialects
