= Jane Willets Ettawageshik =

American anthropologist

Jane Willetts Ettawageshik
- Born: Jane Esther Willetts; February 13, 1915; Milledgeville, Georgia, U.S.
- Died: May 21, 1996 (aged 81); Traverse City, Michigan, U.S.
- Education: Barnard College (BA), University of Pennsylvania ([ MA,)
- Relatives: Fred Ettawageshik (Husband)

Jane Willetts Ettawageshik (February 13, 1915 – May 21, 1996) was an American anthropologist who studied Ottawa indigenous peoples in Northern Michigan and she was first woman anthropologist to work in northern Michigan during the 20th century. She studied anthropology at the University of Pennsylvania from 1947 until 1950.

== Biography ==
Jane Willetts Ettawageshik was born in 1915 in Milledgeville, Georgia, USA. Jane Willets Ettawageshik was raised in Pennsylvania near Philadelphia and schooled at Barnard College in New York City for her Bachelor of Arts degree. Jane Willetts Ettawageshik attended University of Pennsylvania, where she became interested in cultural anthropology. After completing her B.A. degree, she continued her study of anthropology at the University of Pennsylvania, earning her M.A. degree in 1950. Jane Willets Ettawageshik traveled to Michigan's Lower Peninsula in the early summer of 1946 to do field work for her anthropology master's program through the University of Pennsylvania.

She conducted linguistic and anthropological field research on ottawa indigenous groups in northern Michigan, from 1946 to 1948. Jane Willetts Ettawageshik recorded carious sound reel recordings during her time in Harbor Springs, Michigan. The original recordings were copper-wire recordings and Jane Willets Ettawageshik's collection of tapes are kept in their original copper wire format by the American Philosophical Society (APS) The recorded materials in the collection were presented by Jane Willets Ettawageshik in 1950 to the American Philosophical Society and the APS has held the material in their possession since 1954. Jane Willets Ettawageshik collected Ottawa songs, interviews, word lists, legends, Nanabojo stories, autobiographical stories, and information on Ottawa people's history. Some of the material is given in both Ottawa and English, some in Ottawa only during 1947 and 1948. Throughout her work, Jane Willetts Ettawageshik worked with the Grand Traverse Band of Ottawa and Chippewa Indians trying to preserve their culture and language.

As mentioned, Jane Willets Ettawageshik worked hard to preserve the Odawa culture and wanted "readers to learn about that culture through the words of the culture-bearers themselves". Jane Willets Ettawageshik's research and recordings are "the only ethnographic research conducted on the historic Little Traverse Reservation during the mid-twentieth century".

In addition to her fieldwork in Michigan, Willetts Ettawageshik married into the community of Grand Traverse, Michigan. She also taught English in the local High Schools and worked also for the local newspaper.
