= Derek Bailey (tribal chairman) =

American tribal chairman (1972–2021)

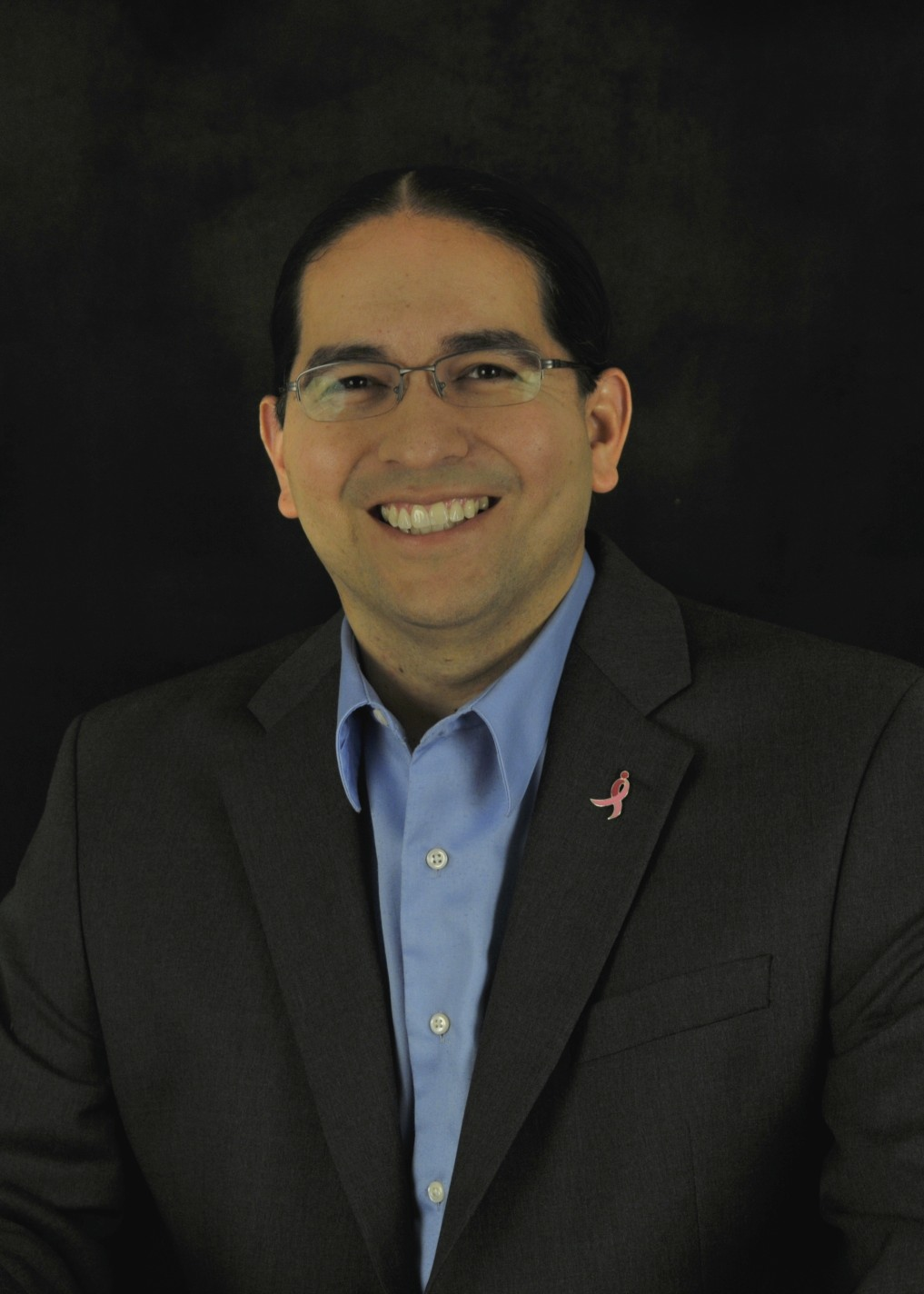

Derek J. Bailey (1972 – September 8, 2021) served as Tribal Chairman of the Grand Traverse Band of Ottawa and Chippewa Indians (GTB) beginning in 2008. He also served prior on Tribal Council from 2004 to 2008. On October 1, 2011, Bailey announced his candidacy for the U.S. House of Representatives in Michigan's 1st congressional district. During April 2012, Bailey ended his Congressional campaign effort and moved into Michigan's State House race for the 101st District (Leelanau, Benzie, Manistee and Mason counties). On May 11, 2015, he was arrested on child molestation charges. Bailey was sentenced to 25 to 50 years after being found guilty in Grand Traverse County of two counts of first degree criminal sexual conduct in April 2016. He was also sentenced to ten to 15 years after being found guilty in Leelanau County of two counts of second degree criminal sexual conduct in November 2015. Bailey was to serve his sentence concurrently. Bailey had a credit of 360 days.

== Early life and education ==
Bailey was a native of Traverse City, Michigan, and grew up there and in neighboring Leelanau County. He earned a bachelor's degree in psychology in 1995 and a master's degree in social work in 1998, both from Grand Valley State University.

== Career ==
=== Tribal service ===
Bailey began serving as the fifth GTB Tribal Chairman in November 2008. Bailey received a Presidential Appointment by President Obama to the National Advisory Council on Indian Education, and was sworn in on November 3, 2010. He resigned from the tribal council in July 2015.

=== Congressional campaign ===
On October 1, 2011, Bailey announced his intention to run for U.S. Representative for Michigan's newly redrawn 1st congressional district. He was to run as a Democrat in the primary against Gary McDowell, a state representative who lost in the general election in 2010 against first-time candidate Dan Benishek. In April 2012 he changed plans and instead decided to run for the state house of Representatives. Bailey was narrowly defeated in the primary by Bernard "Allen" O'Shea.

== Personal life ==
In 2012, he was married and lived in Benzie County. Also according to an article in 2012, Bailey has two sons and two step-daughters.

=== Legal issues ===
In May 2015, Bailey was charged with multiple counts of child molestation in Leelanau County. In August 2015, he was charged with more sex offenses in Grand Traverse County. Bailey was sentenced to 25 to 50 years after being found guilty in Grand Traverse County of two counts of first degree criminal sexual conduct in April 2016. He was also sentenced to ten to 15 years after being found guilty in Leelanau County of two counts of second degree criminal sexual conduct in November 2015. Bailey was to serve his sentence concurrently. Bailey had a credit of 360 days.

== Death ==
On September 2, 2021, Bailey was found unresponsive in his prison cell and later pronounced dead on September 8, 2021. He is believed to have succumbed to a cardiac issue. He was 48.

Preceded by Robert 'Bob K' Keywaygoshkum	Chairman of the Grand Traverse Band of Ottawa and Chippewa Indians; 2008 – 2012	Succeeded by Alvin Pedwaydon
