= Prenoun =

Nominal prefix in some languages

Prenoun is the term for adjective-like prefixes that attach to nouns in Algonquian languages, Japanese, and Korean.

== Algonquian languages ==
For example, in Nêhiyawêwin (Plains Cree), the term for "cat" is minôs. With the addition of the prenoun wâpiski- ("white"), the term wâpiski-minôs means "white cat." With the prenoun misi- ("big"), it becomes misi-minôs, meaning "big cat."

Prenouns can also be attached to verbs and then are referred to by the term "preverb"; misi-mîcsow, "s/he eats a lot"

== Korean ==
In Korean, prenouns are used to modify pronouns, numerals, and nouns. They are different from adjectives in Korean. While adjectives may be conjugated in Korean, prenouns cannot. As well, prenouns modify but adjectives merely indicate the state of an object:

그는	맛있는	고기를	좋아해요.
He	delicious	meat	likes

In that sentence, the word "delicious" is a prenoun. It is not conjugated and modifies the object of the sentence. Compared with the following sentence:

이 고기는	맛있어요.
This meat	delicious

"Delicious" is there conjugated and also becomes an adjective. It is used to indicate the current state of the object.
