= Ojibwe grammar =

Grammar of the Ojibwe language

The Ojibwe language is an Algonquian North American indigenous language spoken throughout the Great Lakes region and westward onto the northern plains. It is one of the largest indigenous language north of Mexico in terms of number of speakers, and exhibits a large number of divergent dialects. For the most part, this article describes the Minnesota variety of the Southwestern dialect. The orthography used is the Fiero Double-Vowel System.

Like many North American languages, Ojibwe is polysynthetic, meaning it exhibits a great deal of synthesis and a very high morpheme-to-word ratio (e.g., the single word for "they are Chinese" is aniibiishaabookewininiiwiwag, which contains six morphemes: leaf-liquid-make-man-be-PLURAL, or approximately "they are leaf-drink [i.e., tea] makers"). It is agglutinating, and thus builds up words by stringing morpheme after morpheme together, rather than having several affixes which carry numerous different pieces of information.

Like most Algonquian languages, Ojibwe distinguishes two different kinds of third person, a proximate and an obviative. The proximate is a traditional third person, while the obviative (also frequently called "fourth person") marks a less important third person if more than one third person is taking part in an action. In other words, Ojibwe uses the obviative to avoid the confusion that could be created by English sentences such as "John and Bill were good friends, ever since the day he first saw him" (who saw whom?). In Ojibwe, one of the two participants would be marked as proximate (whichever one was deemed more important), and the other marked as obviative.

== Gender ==
The gender distinction in Ojibwe is not a masculine/feminine contrast, but is rather between animate and inanimate. Animate nouns are generally living things, and inanimate ones generally nonliving things, although that is not a simple rule because of the cultural understanding as to whether a noun possesses a "spirit" or not (generally, if it can move, it possesses a "spirit"). Objects with great spiritual importance for the Ojibwe, such as rocks, are very often animate rather than inanimate, for example. Some words are distinguished purely by their noun class; for example, mitig, if it is animate (plural mitigoog), means "tree;" if it is inanimate (plural mitigoon), it means "stick."

== Number ==
Number in Ojibwe is a simple singular/plural contrast. Nouns and pronouns can be either singular or plural, and verbs inflect for the number of their subject and object, although some nouns and verbs lack singular forms. Plural forms differ from word to word depending on the word's gender, root, and historical stress. By examining the plural form of the word, one can generally determine the word's gender and root. Animate plurals end in -g, while inanimate plural nouns (and obviative nouns) end in -n. The underlying form of a root determines the "linking vowel" — the vowel that appears before the plural suffix (-g or -n) but after the root itself.

== Person ==
There are seven Ojibwe inflectional categories expressing person/gender combinations for each of the two numbers (singular and plural). However, the singular and plural categories do not always exactly correspond. The total number of 14 "persons" arises from taking into consideration all the contrasts of animate/inanimate, proximate/obviative, and singular/plural.

Animate gender (singular)

- X — unspecified actor
- 1 — first person singular
- 2 — second person singular
- 3 — third person, animate
- 3’ — animate obviative, or fourth person, animate
  - 3’’ — third person animate, possessed by obviative

Animate gender (plural)

- 1p — first person plural, exclusive
- 21 — first person plural, inclusive
- 2p — second person plural
- 3p — third person plural, animate
- 3’p — third person plural, animate obviative, or animate fourth person proximate plural

Inanimate gender

- 0 — third person singular, inanimate
- 0’ — third person singular, inanimate obviative
- 0p — third person plural, inanimate
- 0’p — third person plural, inanimate obviative

Characteristics of the resulting 14 persons are built into Ojibwe nouns and pronouns, thus dictating which verb forms would be used in speech. In nouns and verbs, all 14 forms of persons may or may not present themselves, as words are divided as either animate or inanimate genders and very few words exist as both, but all 14 forms of persons generally do appear with pronouns.

== Pronouns ==
Ojibwe pronouns, along with distinguishing singular and plural number and first, second, third, and fourth (obviative) persons, also carry a distinction between inclusive and exclusive first person plural. Pronouns may present themselves either as independent words or as series of prefixes and suffixes.

An inclusive first person plural indicates that the pronoun includes the addressee, i.e., "we including you" (giinawind). An exclusive first person plural indicates that the addressee is not included, i.e., "we excluding you" (niinawind).

The other personal pronouns are the first singular niin, second singular giin, third singular wiin, second plural giinawaa, and third plural wiinawaa.

Like the independent words, Ojibwe pronominal prefixes indicate first person with n-, second person with g- and third person with w-. However, the associated suffixes for these persons will be different depending on if the word is a verb or a noun.

Word begins with...	1 or "n-"	2 or "g-"	3 or "w-"
o	((n)i)ndo-	gido-	odo-
a aa e i	((n)i)nd-	gid-	od-
aa (by some Red Lake speakers)	niy-	giy-	ow-\oy-
oo	n-	g-	od-
ii	n-	g-	w-
b	(n)im-	gi-	(o)-
d g ' j z zh	(n)in-	gi-	(o)-
p t k h ch m n s sh w y	ni-	gi-	(o)-

In many Ojibwe-speaking communities, the first person prefix is used without the initial n. Due to vowel syncope in some communities, those prefixes are further reduced without the initial i. However, among Saulteaux communities, the first person prefix nim- and nin- are instead reduced to ni-, nind- to nid- and nindo- to nido-.

Ojibwe also has a set of demonstrative pronouns, distinguishing animate/inanimate, here/there/yonder/over here, singular/plural, and proximate/obviative. The demonstratives differ in their phonetic forms very significantly across Ojibwe dialects and communities, so this table, based on the Minnesota dialect of Southwestern Ojibwe, will not be entirely correct for many speakers:

			Animate			Inanimate	
			Singular	Plural	Obviative	Singular	Plural
Demonstrative	Proximal (Nearest)	Here	(wa')aw	o(n)gow	onow	(o')ow	onow
Demonstrative	Mesioproximal	Over here	(wa')awedi	o(n)gowedi(g)	onowedi(n)	o'owedi	onowedi(n)
Demonstrative	Mesiodistal	There	(a')aw	i(n)giw	iniw	(i')iw	iniw
Demonstrative	Distal (Farthest)	Over there/Yonder	(a')awedi	i(n)giwedi(g)	iniwedi(n)	(i')iwedi	iniwedi(n)
Dubitative			awegwen	awegwenag	awegwenan	wegodogwen	wegodogwenan
Interrogative			awenen	awenenag	awenenan	awegonen	awegonenan

Ojibwe also has a set of "indefinite" pronouns (awiiya, "someone", gegoo, "something," both of which can be preceded by gaawiin or akina to mean "no one, nothing" and "everyone, everything," respectively).

In contrast to the Southwestern Ojibwe's demonstrative pronouns, Central Ojibwe, Northwestern Ojibwe and Western Ojibwe—which includes a larger set of obviatives—have a larger set of demonstratives:

			Animate				Inanimate			
			Singular	Plural	Singular Obviative	Plural Obviative	Singular	Plural	Singular Obviative	Plural Obviative
Demonstrative	Nearest..... Farthest	Here	wa'a(we)	ogo(we)/ ogoweniwag	ono(we)/ onoweniwan	ono(we)/ onoweniwa'	o'o(we)/ owe	ono(we)/ onoweniwan	o'oweni	ono(we)/ onoweniwan
Demonstrative	Nearest..... Farthest	Over here	wa'a(we)di	ogo(we)di(g)/ ogowediniwag	ono(we)di(n)/ onowediniwan	ono(we)di(')/ onowediniwa'	o'o(we)di/ owedi	ono(we)di(n)/ onowediniwan	o'owedini	ono(we)din/ onowediniwan
Demonstrative	Nearest..... Farthest	There	a'a(we)/ awe	igi(we)/ igiweniwag	ini(we)/ iniweniwan	ini(we)/ iniweniwa'	i'i(we)/ iwe	ini(we)/ iniweniwan	i'iweni	ini(we)/ iniweniwan
Demonstrative	Nearest..... Farthest	Over there/Yonder	a'a(we)di/ awedi	igi(we)di(g)/ igiwediniwag	ini(we)di(n)/ iniwediniwan	ini(we)di(')/ iniwediniwa'	i'i(we)di/ iwedi	ini(we)di(n)/ iniwediniwan	i'iwedini	ini(we)din/ iniwediniwan

== Verbs ==
Ojibwe verbs mark information not only on the subject (their animacy, person, and plurality) but also on the object. There are several different classes of verbs in the language, which differ based on whether they are transitive or intransitive and whether they take animate or inanimate subjects. These are the main classes:

Function	Subject	Type	Object	Theme	Abbreviated
verb	inanimate	intransitive	none		VII
verb	inanimate	intransitive	none	inherently plural	VIIp
verb	animate	intransitive	none		VAI
verb	animate	intransitive	none	pseudo-VAI	VAI2
verb	animate	intransitive	none	optional object	VAIo
verb	animate	intransitive	none	inherently plural	VAIp
verb	animate	transitive	inanimate	-am stem	VTI
verb	animate	transitive	inanimate	-oo stem	VTI2
verb	animate	transitive	inanimate	-i stem	VTI3
verb	animate	transitive	inanimate	-aam stem	VTI4
verb	animate	transitive	animate		VTA
verb	animate	transitive	animate	inverse only	VTAi

Verbs mark tenses with prefixes (a'-, aorist past, gii'-, simple past, ga(d)- and da-, future, and wii'-, desiderative future), but also can take a myriad of affixes known as "preverbs", which convey a great amount of additional information about an action. For example, the preverb izhi- means "in such a way," and so its addition to the verb root -ayaa-, "to be," makes the verb izhi-ayaa, "to be a certain way." The preverb bimi-, "along," combines with the verb root -batoo-, "to run," to form bimibatoo, "to run along, run by." The preferred order of these prefixes are personal prefix, tense prefix, directional prefix, relative prefix, any number of preverbs, and finally the verb. In addition, the initial syllable may be modified by an initial vowel change or by an initial syllable reduplication.

Furthermore, there are three so-called "orders" of Ojibwe verbs. The basic one is called Independent Order, and is simply the indicative mood. There is also a Conjunct Order, which is most often used with verbs in subordinate clauses, in questions (other than simple yes–no questions), and with participles (participles in Ojibwe are verbal nouns, whose meaning is roughly equivalent to "someone who is (VERB), does (VERB)," for example, the word for "traveler," bebaamaadizid, is the third singular conjunct of babaamaadizi, "to travel about," and literally means "someone who travels about"). The final order is the Imperative Order, used with commands and corresponding to the imperative mood.

Negatives are generally introduced by the leading word gaawiin, which is usually translated as "no," before introducing the actual words in their negative form. Negatives are generally formed by adding sii (or zii) for independent order and si (or zi) for conjunct order, both adding the negative element immediately after the root but before other suffixes. The sii/si are found after vowels while the zii/zi are found after n. In some words, the final consonant is dropped and the sii/si are added to the remaining vowel, in other words the final m is converted to n before adding zii/zi, yet in other words a linking vowel i (or aa) is added after the final consonant and then the sii/si added. Imperatives do not follow the sii (zii)/si (zi) pattern.

There are three imperatives in Ojibwe: the immediate imperative, used to indicate that the action must be completely right away (nibaan!, "Sleep (right now)!"), the delayed imperative, used to indicate that the action should be completely eventually, but not immediately (nibaakan!, "Sleep (in a little bit)!"), and the prohibitive imperative, used to indicate that the action is prohibited ((gego) nibaaken!, "Don't sleep!"). Like the negatives, the "k" in -k, -ken, -keg and -kegon take on the lenis form and become "g" after n. Also like the negatives, the general the connector vowel between the imperative suffix and the terminal consonant here is i; however, for k/g, the connector vowel instead is o.

All verbs can also be marked for four "modes:" indicative (neutral), dubitative (the speaker is unsure about the validity of what they are saying, for example: bakade, "he is hungry," but bakadedog, "he must be hungry; he could be hungry"), preterit (which emphasizes that the action occurred in the past, and is also used to refer to attempted or intended but uncompleted actions, for example: imaa ninamadab, "I'm sitting there," but imaa ninamadabiban, "I was sitting there; I meant to sit there"), or preterit-dubitative (which expresses doubt about a past action: imaa namadabigoban, "she must have sat there; she could have sat there").

=== Intransitives ===
As an example of some of the Ojibwe verbal distinctions at work, consider the conjugation of positive and negative indicative long-vowel-final VAI verbs (using the example nibaa, "to sleep"):

Subject	Independent									
Subject	Positive					Negative^{1}				
Subject	Conjugation			Example	Gloss	Conjugation			Example	Gloss
Giin (2s)	g	_	Ø	ginibaa	"You sleep"	g	_	sii(n)^{2}	ginibaasiin	"You don't sleep"
Giinawaa (2p)	g	_	m^{3}	ginibaam	"You guys sleep"	g	_	siim^{3}	ginibaasiim	"You guys don't sleep"
Giinawind (21)	g	_	mi(n)^{2}	ginibaamin	"We (inclusive) sleep"	g	_	siimi(n)^{2}	ginibaasiimin	"We (inclusive) don't sleep"
Niinawind (1p)	n	_	mi(n)^{2}	ninibaamin	"We (exclusive) sleep"	n	_	siimi(n)^{2}	ninibaasiimin	"We (exclusive) don't sleep"
Niin (1s)	n	_	Ø	ninibaa	"I sleep"	n	_	sii(n)^{2}	ninibaasiin	"I don't sleep"
Indefinite (X)	Ø	_	m	nibaam	"Someone sleeps"	Ø	_	siim	nibaasiim	"Someone doesn't sleep"
Wiin (3s)	Ø	_	Ø	nibaa	"S/he sleeps"	Ø	_	sii(n)^{2}	nibaasiin	"S/he doesn't sleep"
Wiinawaa (3p)	Ø	_	wag	nibaawag	"They sleep"	Ø	_	siiwag	nibaasiiwag	"They don't sleep"
Obviative (3')	Ø	_	wan	nibaawan	"S/he (obviate) sleeps"	Ø	_	siiwan	nibaasiiwan	"S/he (obviate) doesn't sleep"
Subject	Conjunct									
Subject	Positive					Negative^{1}				
Subject	Conjugation			Example	Gloss	Conjugation			Example	Gloss
Giin (2s)	Ø	_	yan^{4}	nibaayan	"That you sleep"	Ø	_	siwan	nibaasiwan	"That you don't sleep"
Giinawaa (2p)	Ø	_	yeg	nibaayeg	"That you guys sleep"	Ø	_	siweg	nibaasiweg	"That you guys don't sleep"
Giinawind (21)	Ø	_	yang	nibaayang	"That we (inclusive) sleep"	Ø	_	siwang	nibaasiwang	"That we (inclusive) don't sleep"
Niinawind (1p)	Ø	_	yaang	nibaayaang	"That we (exclusive) sleep"	Ø	_	siwaang	nibaasiwaang	"That we (exclusive) don't sleep"
Niin (1s)	Ø	_	yaan	nibaayaan	"That I sleep"	Ø	_	siwaan(h)^{5}	nibaasiwaan	"That I don't sleep"
Indefinite (X)	Ø	_	ng	nibaang	"That someone sleeps"	Ø	_	sing	nibaasing	"That someone doesn't sleep"
Wiin (3s)	Ø	_	d	nibaad	"That s/he sleeps"	Ø	_	sig	nibaasig	"That s/he doesn't sleep"
Wiinawaa (3p)	Ø	_	waad	nibaawaad	"That they sleep"	Ø	_	siwaa	nibaasiwaa	"That they doesn't sleep"
Obviative (3')	Ø	_	nid	nibaanid	"That s/he (obviate) sleeps"	Ø	_	sinid/sinig	nibaasinid nibaasinig	"That s/he (obviate) doesn't sleep"
Subject	Imperative (Immediate)					Imperative (Prohibitive)				
Subject	Conjugation			Example	Gloss	Conjugation			Example	Gloss
Giin (2s)	Ø	_	n	nibaan	"You! Sleep!" (now)	Ø	_	ken	nibaaken	"You! Don't Sleep!"
Giinawaa (2p)	Ø	_	(o)k/(o)g	nibaag nibaayok	"You guys! Sleep!" (now)	Ø	_	kegon	nibaakegon	"You guys! Don't Sleep!"
Giinawind (21)	Ø	_	daa^{6}	nibaadaa	"Let's sleep!" (now)	Ø	_	siidaa^{6}	nibaasiidaa	"Let's not sleep!"
Subject	Imperative (Delayed)									
Subject	Positive					Negative^{1}				
Subject	Conjugation			Example	Gloss	Conjugation			Example	Gloss
Giin (2s)	Ø	_	(:)kan^{7}	nibaakan	"You! Sleep!" (soon)	Ø	_	siikan	nibaasiikan	"You! Don't sleep!" (soon)
Giinawaa (2p)	Ø	_	(:)keg^{7}	nibaakeg	"You guys! Sleep!" (soon)	Ø	_	siikeg	nibaasiikeg	"You guys! Don't sleep!" (soon)
Giinawind (21)	Ø	_	(:)kang^{7}	nibaakang	"Let's sleep!" (soon)	Ø	_	siikang	nibaasiikang	"Let's not sleep!" (soon)

1 s following n becomes a z.
2 In Odaawaa, the final n is absent.
3 Instead of m, naawaa is used in Algonquin and Severn Ojibwe.
4 In Odaawaa and some Algonquin, yin is used instead of yan.
5 In Odaawaa, nh is used instead of n.
6 Instead of daa, daan is used by some Algonquin speakers, daag is used by some Saulteaux speakers, and ga-__min is used by some Severn Ojibwe and Saulteaux speakers.
7 Short vowels are lengthened before adding the suffix.

Also as an example of some of the Ojibwe verbal distinctions at work, consider the conjugation of positive and negative indicative long-vowel-final VII verbs (using the example ozhaawashkwaa, "to (be) blue"). Note that unlike VAI verbs, VII do not have imperatives:

Subject	Independent									
Subject	Positive					Negative^{1}				
Subject	Conjugation			Example	Gloss	Conjugation			Example	Gloss
Singular (0s)	Ø	_	(w)^{2}	ozhaawashkwaa	"This blues"	Ø	_	sinoo(n)^{3}	ozhaawashkwaasiinoon	"This doesn't blue"
Plural (0p)	Ø	_	wan/oon^{5,6}	ozhaawashkwaawan	"These blue"	Ø	_	sinoon	ozhaawashkwaasiinoon	"These don't blue"
Singular Obviative (0s')	Ø	_	ini(w)^{2}	ozhaawashkwaani	"That blues"	Ø	_	sinini(w)^{2,4}	ozhaawashkwaasinini	"That doesn't blue"
Plural Obviative (0p')	Ø	_	iniwan	ozhaawashkwaaniwan	"Those blue"	Ø	_	sininiwan	ozhaawashkwaasininiwan	"Those don't blue"
Subject	Conjunct									
Subject	Positive					Negative^{1}				
Subject	Conjugation			Example	Gloss	Conjugation			Example	Gloss
Singular (0s)	Ø	_	g	ozhaawashkwaag	"That this blues"	Ø	_	sinog	ozhaawashkwaasinog	"That this doesn't blue"
Plural (0p)	Ø	_	g^{7}	ozhaawashkwaag	"That these blue"	Ø	_	sinog	ozhaawashkwaasinog	"That these don't blue"
Singular Obviative (0s')	Ø	_	inig	ozhaawashkwaanig	"That that blues"	Ø	_	sininig	ozhaawashkwaasininig	"That that doesn't blue"
Plural Obviative (0p')	Ø	_	inig	ozhaawashkwaanig	"That those blue"	Ø	_	sininig	ozhaawashkwaasininig	"That those don't blue"

1 s following n becomes a z.
2 In some words, a final w is present.
3 In Odaawaa, the final n is absent.
4 In Odaawaa, sinooni instead of sinini(w).
5 wan for vowel finals; oon for consonant finals.
6 In Odaawaa, vowel finals can take either wan or noon; in some North of Superior Ojibwe, wanoon is used.
7 In Odaawaa, gin instead of g.

Passives in intransitives can be expressed by using the INVERSE marker igw, which may undergo a minor structural modification. Some examples of verb final containing the INVERSE marker igw are:

active			passive		
VAI	VII	gloss	VAI	VII	gloss
endam	N/A	thinks X	endaagozi	endaagwad	thought of X
imaaso	imaate	smells X	imaagozi	imaagwad	smelled of X

=== Transitives ===
Ojibwe, as with other Algonquian languages, also exhibits a direct–inverse system, in which transitive verbs are marked for whether or not the direction of the action follows a "topicality hierarchy" of the language. The topicality hierarchy in Ojibwe is 2 > 1 > X > 3 > 3’ > 0, determined by 1) person, 2) gender, and 3) obviation. Ojibwe has no case distinctions among agent, patient and experiencer theta roles, so in a transitive verb with two participants, the only way to distinguish subject from object is through direct/inverse/goal suffixes.

Note: C, N, nN, S and Y are used in some of the tables below to indicate a generic consonant, n\zh varying consonant, n\nzh varying consonant, s\sh varying consonant, and Ø\i varying palatializer, respectively.

Direction Type		ACTOR	DIRECTION	GOAL	Theme
local	1-GOAL	(2)	→	1	-Y-
local	2-GOAL	2	←	(1)	-iN-
non-local	DIRECT		→	3	-aa-
non-local	INVERSE		←	3	-igw-

The local goals, non-local goals and reflective cause the stem to undergo minor adjustments:

VT Stem	1-GOAL Y	1-GOAL iN-Y^{1}	2-GOAL iN	DIRECT aa	INVERSE igw	RECIPROCATIVE idw	REFLECTIVE idw-izw	POSSESSIVE im
-C	-C-	-Cizh-	-Cin-	-Caa-	-Cigw-	-Cidiw-	-Cidizw-	-Cim-
-d	-j-	-dizh-	-din-	-daa-	-jigw-	-jidiw-	-jidizw-	-dim-
-t	-ch-	-tizh-	-tin-	-taa-	-chigw-	-chidiw-	-chidizw-	-tim-
-m	-m-	-mizh-	-min-	-maa-	-ngw-	-ndiw-	-ndizw-	-mim-
-m^{1}	-m-	-mizh-	-min-	-maa-	-migw-	-midiw-	-midizw-	-mim-
-n	-n-	-nizh-	-nin-	-naa-	-ngw-	-ndiw-	-ndizw-	-nim-
-N	-zh-	-nizh-	-nin-	-naa-	-nigw-	-nidiw-	-nidizw-	-nim-
-nN	-nzh-	-nizh-	-nin-	-naa-	-nigw-	-nidiw-	-nidizw-	-nim-
-S	-sh-	-sizh-	-sin-	-saa-	-sigw-	-sidiw-	-sidizw-	-sim-
-Cw	-C-	-Cozh-	-Con-	-Cwaa-	-Cogw-	-Codiw-	-Codizw-	-Com-
-CVw	-CVw-	-CVVzh-	-CVVn-	-CVwaa-	-CVVgw-	-CVVdiw-	-CVVdizw-	-CVwim-
-Caw	-Caw-	-Coozh-	-Coon-	-Cawaa-	-Caagw-	-Caadiw-	-Caadizw-	-Cawim-
-CVVw	-CVVw-	-CVVzh-	-CVVn-	-CVVwaa-	-CVVgw-	-CVVdiw-	-CVVdizw-	-CVVm-

1. In Oji-Cree (Severn Ojibwe) language, in Algonquin language, and in some Central Ojibwa language (especially in North of Superior Ojibwe)

Transitive verbs can become VAI class of verbs by adding the actor-focused DETRANSITIVE marker ige, which modifies the stem in a similar fashion as the INVERSE marker igw. However, due to differences in dialects, how the actor-focused DETRANSITIVE marker ige may show up differently.

Dialect	VTA	VAI (RECIPROCATIVE with plural ending)	VAI (REFLEXIVE)	VAI	VTI	VAI (actor-focused DETRANSITIVE)
Oji-Cree	enim	enimidowag	enimidizo	enindam	enindan	eninjige
Algonquin	enim	enindiwag	enindizo	enindam	enindan	eninge
Southwestern Ojibwe	enim	enindiwag	endizo	endam	endan	enjige
Odaawaa and Eastern Ojibwe	enim	endiwag	endizo	endam	endan	enge
gloss	think X about S.O.	think X about each other	think X about oneself	think X	think X about S.T.	think X about things

For the first person and second person GOALs, their ACTORs are specified if the words are in their Independent Order, and can also be known as local direct (first person GOAL) and local inverse (second person GOAL). A DIRECT suffix indicates that the action is performed by someone higher on the person hierarchy on someone lower on the person hierarchy (e.g., by the addressee on the speaker, or by a proximate third person on an obviative):

o- bizindaw -aa -n
3- listen.to -DIRECT -3OBVIATIVE
"He listens to the other one."

An inverse suffix indicates that the action is performed by someone lower on the person hierarchy on someone higher on the person hierarchy (e.g., by the speaker on the addressee, or by an obviative third person on a proximate):

o- bizindaw -igoo -n
3- listen.to -INVERSE -3OBVIATIVE
"The other one listens to him."

As can be seen, the only difference between these two verbs is the direct–inverse opposition, rather than case markers (or word order, when distinct nominals are used). An inverse verb is not equivalent to a passive verb. There is a separate passivity marker, denoted in literature as "indefinite person (X)", ranked in topicality hierarchy below first and second persons, but higher than animate and inanimate third persons:

{} bizindaw -aa
X- listen.to -DIRECT
"He is listened to."

To illustrate this, a generic VTA and VTI paradigm table, arranged by person hierarchy, is shown below. Note that the reflexive forms shown in a darker background with the reflexive theme /-idizo/ happen to be VAI. The table depicts only the paradigm for Independent Order, Positive Voice, Neutral Mode. Letters omitted in a particular form are indicated with that letter struck-through.

Subject	Animate Object									Inanimate Object^{1}	
Subject	2s	2p	21	1p	1s	X	3s	3p	3'	0s	0p
2s	g__idiz~~o~~	——	——	g__(Y)in^{2} g__(Y)imin g__(Y)imi~~n~~^{OTW} g__(Y)inaam^{OJB,OJW} g__izhinaam^{3,ALQ,OJS,PIC} g__izhinim^{3,OJS(4)}	g__(Y)~~i~~ g__izh^{3,PIC} g__izhinan^{3,ALQ,OJS}	g__aaw~~i~~^{2}	g__aa	g__aag	g__aan g__aa^{OTW} g__imaan^{BLK,CIW,PIC}	g__(:)n	g__(:)nan
2p	——	g__idizom g__idizonaawaa^{ALQ,OJS}	——	g__(Y)imin g__(Y)imi~~n~~^{OTW} g__(Y)inaam^{OJB,OJW} g__izhinaam^{3,ALQ,OJS,PIC} g__izhinim^{3,OJS(4)}	g__(Y)im g__izhim^{3,ALQ,OJS,PIC}	g__aawim^{2}	g__aawaa	g__aawaag	g__aawaa g__aawaan^{POT} g__imaawaa^{CIW,PIC} g__imaawaan^{BLK}	g__(:)naawaa	g__(:)naawaan
21	——	——	g__idizomin g__idizomi~~n~~^{OTW}	——	——	g__aawimin^{2}	g__aanaan g__aanaa~~n~~^{OTW} g__aamin^{PAR, POT}	g__aanaanig g__aamin^{PAR, POT}	g__aanaan g__aanaa~~n~~^{OTW} g__aamin^{PAR, POT} g__imaanaan^{BLK,CIW,PIC}	g__(:)naan g__(:)naa~~n~~^{OTW} g__(:)min^{CIW, PAR}	g__(:)naanin g__(:)min^{CIW,PAR}
1p	g__inin^{2} g__inim^{ALQ} g__inimin^{WAL, POT} g__inimi~~n~~^{OTW} g__igoo	g__inimin^{WAL, POT, 2} g__inimi~~n~~^{OTW} g__igoom	——	n__idizomin n__idizomi~~n~~^{OTW}	——	n__aawimin^{2}	n__aanaan n__aanaa~~n~~^{OTW} n__aamin^{PAR, POT}	n__aanaanig n__aamin^{PAR, POT}	n__aanaan n__aanaa~~n~~^{OTW} n__aamin^{PAR, POT} n__imaanaan^{BLK,CIW,PIC}	n__(:)naan n__(:)naa~~n~~^{OTW} n__(:)min^{CIW,PAR}	n__(:)naanin n__(:)min^{CIW,PAR}
1s	g__in	g__inim g__ininim^{BLK,CIW, PIC}	——	——	n__idiz~~o~~	n__aaw~~i~~^{2}	n__aa	n__aag	n__aan n__aa~~n~~^{OTW} n__imaan^{BLK,CIW,PIC}	n__(:)n	n__(:)nan
X	g__igoo g__igow~~i~~^{2}	g__igoom g__igowim^{2}	g__igoomin g__igoomi~~n~~^{OTW} g__igowimin^{2}	n__igoomin n__igoomi~~n~~^{OTW} n__igowimin^{2}	n__igoo n__igow~~i~~^{2}	Ø__idizom	Ø__aa; Ø__aaganii^{ALQ} Ø__aaw^{2}	Ø__aawag; Ø__aaganiiwag^{ALQ}	Ø__aawan; Ø__aaganiiwan^{ALQ} Ø__imaawan^{BLK,CIW,PIC}	Ø__(:)m	Ø__(:)m
3s	g__ig~~o~~	g__igowaa	g__igonaan g__igonaa~~n~~^{OTW} g__igomin^{PAR}	n__igonaan n__igonaa~~n~~^{OTW} n__igomin^{PAR}	n__ig~~o~~	Ø__igo; Ø__igow^{2}	Ø__idizo w__aan^{ALQ,BLK}	—— w__aan^{ALQ,BLK}	w__aan	w__(:)n	w__(:)nan
3p	g__igoog	g__igowaag	g__igonaanig g__igomin^{PAR}	n__igonaanig n__igomin^{PAR}	n__igoog	Ø__igowag	—— w__aawaan^{ALQ,BLK}	Ø__idizowag w__aawaan^{ALQ,BLK,OJC}	w__aawaan	w__(:)naawaa	w__(:)naawaan
3'	g__igoon^{2} g__ig~~o~~	g__igowaan^{2} g__igowaa	g__igonaanin^{2} g__igonaan g__igonaa~~n~~^{OTW} g__igomin^{PAR}	n__igonaanin^{2} n__igonaan n__igonaa~~n~~^{OTW} n__igomin^{PAR}	n__igoon^{2} n__ig~~o~~	Ø__igowan	w__igoon	w__igowaan w__igoon^{ALQ}	Ø__idizowan w__igoon^{ALQ}	w__(:)nini w__ini^{OJG,OTW}	w__(:)nini w__ini^{OJG,OTW}
0s	g__igon	g__igonaawaa	g__igonaan g__igonaa^{OTW} g__igomin^{PAR,PIC}	n__igonaan n__igonaa~~n~~^{OTW} n__igomin^{PAR,PIC}	n__igon	Ø__igom^{2} w__igonini^{CIW}	w__igon	w__igonaawaa	w__igonini w__igon^{OJG,OTW}	——	——
0p	g__igonan	g__igonaawaan	g__igonaanin g__igomin^{PAR,PIC}	n__igonaanin n__igomin^{PAR,PIC}	n__igonan	Ø__igom^{2} w__igonini^{CIW}	w__igonan	w__igonaawaan	w__igonini w__igonan^{OJG,OTW}	——	——

1. VTI1 -am + (:)m or (:)n → -aam or -aan.
VTI2 -oo + (:)m or (:)n → -oom or -oon.
VTI3 -i + (:)m or (:)n → -im or -in.
VTI4 -aam + (:)m or (:)n → -aam or -aan.

2. In theory.
3. iN-Y form instead of Y form.
4. In some Severn Ojibwe.

ALQ : Algonquin
CIW : Southwestern Ojibwe
OJB : Northwestern Ojibwe
OJC : Central Ojibwe

OJG : Eastern Ojibwe
OJS : Severn Ojibwe
OJW : Saulteaux
OTW : Odaawaa

BLK : Border Lake Ojibwe
PAR : Parry Island Eastern Ojibwe
PIC : Pic River Central Ojibwe
WAL : Walpole Island Eastern Ojibwe
POT : Potawatomi language

== Preverbs ==
Ojibwe language is rich in its use of preverbs, which is a prefix that comes before verbs, nouns, and particles, to provide an additional layer of meaning. In Ojibwe, there are four classes of preverbs ranked in importance by six degrees:

- class 1—tense, aspect, mode, or syntactic prefix appearing on verbs
  - mode-subordinator:
    - subordinator: e-, gaa-, waa-
    - modal: ga[d]-, da-, daa-, ji-, ge[d]-.
  - tense-negativity
    - tense: a'- [e'-], gii'- [gaa'-], wii'- [waa'-].
    - negativity: aano-, bwaa-.
- class 2—directional prefix occurring on verbs
- class 3—relational prefix occurring on verbs (and on some nouns and particles): ako- [eko-], onji- [wenji-], izhi- [ezhi-], apiichi- [epiichi-], dazhi- [endazhi-], daso- [endaso-].
- class 4—lexical prefix occurring on verbs, nouns, or particles.
  - aspectual
  - manner, degree, quality/evaluative, quantitative/numeric

Preverbs, when they occur before a noun, are called a prenoun. Preverb class units when written are separated with a hyphen, with the exception of the class 4 preverb indicating manner, degree, quality/evaluative, or quantitative/numeric, which can also serve as functional part of a word stem as an initial. If several preverbs of the same class occur, they are written as a single block in order of rank of importance, with the most important preverb located closest to the word. Pronominal prefixes are written directly onto the head of the word group, so it may be found attached directly to the preverb if a preverb is present. When constructed, an Ojibwe word (in the example below, a verb) may have some or all of the pieces in the following form:

prefix					word stem				suffix		
pronominal prefix	preverb- (class 1)	preverb- (class 2)	preverb- (class 3)	preverb- (class 4)	verb (initial)	verb (medial)	verb (concrete final)	verb (abstract final)	negativity	pronominal suffix	mode

Example, using nibaa, "to sleep"

Ojibwe	English	Comment
nibaa	he/she sleeps	has no preverb
ninibaamin	we sleep	likewise, with pronominal prefix and pronominal suffix
gii'-nibaa	he/she slept	has past tense preverb (class 1)
ningii'-nibaamin	we slept	likewise, with pronominal affixes
gii'-maajii-nibaa	he/she started to sleep	has past tense preverb (class 1), and a lexical preverb (class 4)
ningii'-maajii-nibaamin	we started to sleep	likewise, with pronominal affixes

== Nouns ==
Nouns distinguish plurality, animacy, obviation, and case with suffixes. Animacy is only overtly marked on plural nouns. There are no core cases to distinguish categories such as "subject" or "object", but rather various oblique cases, including a locative (e.g., wiisiniwigamig, "restaurant", wiisiniwigamigong, "in the restaurant") and a vocative plural (e.g., Ojibwedog, "(you) Ojibwes!"). Other suffixes are: pejorative (e.g., jiimaan, "canoe", jiimaanish, "worthless canoe"), diminutive (e.g., zhooniyaa, "money", zhooniyaans, "coin"), contemptive (e.g., odaabaan, "car", odaabaanenh, "just some old car"), preterit (which marks a deceased or no-longer existent person or object, e.g. nookomis, "my grandmother", nookomisiban, "my late grandmother"), and preterit-dubitative (which marks a deceased or no-longer existent person or object which was never known by the speaker, e.g. a'aw mindimooyenh, "that old woman", a'aw mindimooyenyigoban, "that late old woman I never knew").

Some nouns are considered "dependent" and cannot be presented by themselves. Instead, these dependent nouns are presented with pronoun prefixes/suffixes attached to them. An example of a dependent noun is nookomis ("my grandmother") where the dependent root -ookomis- ("grandmother") must be presented with a pronoun affix, which in this case is n-.

=== Verb to noun transforms ===
Other nouns are derived from verbs by transforming them to their participle form. Of the choices, third person (and thus third person plural) is the most common form. Though each class of verbs may have their own participle-forming patterns, for simplicity, only the VAI neutral mode, positive participles are shown in the example, again, using nibaa ("sleep").

Note: C, V, and VV are used in some of the tables below to indicate a generic consonant, a generic short vowel, and a generic long vowel, respectively.

Subject	VAI (ending in -V or -VV) Neutral Mode, Positive Participles												VAI2 (ending in -am) Neutral Mode, Positive Participles													
Subject	Conjugation OTW, CIW			Conjugation OJB, OJC, OJW			Conjugation OJS			Conjugation ALQ			Conjugation OTW, CIW			Conjugation OJB, OJC, OJW			Conjugation OJS			Conjugation ALQ			Example CIW	Gloss
Giin (2s)	Ø	*	yan	Ø	*	yan	Ø	*	yan	Ø	*	yan	Ø	*	aman	Ø	*	aman	Ø	*	aman	Ø	*	aman	nebaayan	"Sleeper"
Giinawind (21)	Ø	*	yang	Ø	*	yang	Ø	*	yang	Ø	*	yang	Ø	*	amang	Ø	*	amang	Ø	*	amang	Ø	*	amang	nebaayang	"Sleepers"
Giinawaa (2p)	Ø	*	yeg	Ø	*	yeg	Ø	*	yeg	Ø	*	yeg	Ø	*	ameg	Ø	*	ameg	Ø	*	ameg	Ø	*	ameg	nebaayeg	"Sleepers"
Niin (1s)	Ø	*	yaan(h)^{1}	Ø	*	yaan	Ø	*	yaan	Ø	*	yaan	Ø	*	amaan(h)^{1}	Ø	*	amaan	Ø	*	amaan	Ø	*	amaan	nebaayaan	"Sleeper"
Niinawind (1p)	Ø	*	yaang	Ø	*	yaang	Ø	*	yaang	Ø	*	yaang	Ø	*	amaang	Ø	*	amaang	Ø	*	amaang	Ø	*	amaang	nebaayaang	"Sleepers"
Indefinite (X)	Ø	*	ng	Ø	*	ng	Ø	*	ng	Ø	*	ng	Ø	*	aming	Ø	*	aming	Ø	*	aming	Ø	*	aming	nebaang	"Sleeper"
Wiin (3s)	Ø	*	d	Ø	*	d	Ø	*	j	Ø	*	j	Ø	*	ang	Ø	*	ang	Ø	*	ang	Ø	*	ang	nebaad	"Sleeper"
Wiinawaa (3p)	Ø	*	jig	Ø	*	waad	Ø	*	waaj	Ø	*	waaj	Ø	*	angig	Ø	*	amowaad	Ø	*	amowaaj	Ø	*	amowaaj	nebaajig	"Sleepers"
Obviative singular (3's)	Ø	*	nijin	Ø	*	nid	Ø	*	nij	Ø	*	nj	Ø	*	aminijin	Ø	*	aminid	Ø	*	aminij	Ø	*	aminj	nebaanijin	"Sleeper(s)"
Obviative plural (3'p)	Ø	*	nijin	Ø	*	nijin	Ø	*	nijin	Ø	*	njin	Ø	*	aminijin	Ø	*	aminijin	Ø	*	aminijin	Ø	*	aminjin	nebaanijin	"Sleeper(s)"

* For participles, the word experiences initial vowel change.
^{1} -nh in Odaawaa.

Verbs additionally can be transformed into nouns representing concepts by adding -win, or into nouns representing an object by adding -gan or -n, or if a VAI into a gerund by dropping the final vowel or if VAI2 by adding -o.

=== Plurals and obviative ===
Plurals and obviative suffixes are the easiest to add to Ojibwe words. By examining the plural, one can generally determine the underlying root of the word. Generally, animate plurals end with -g, while inanimate plurals and obviatives end with -n. Often, a linking vowel is required to join the root to one of these endings. Underlying -w or -y or an augment may affect the choice of linking vowels. A few plurals do not follow this rule, for example, mishi, misan "piece(s) of firewood".

Singular	Inanimate Plural	Animate Plural	Obviative^{1}	Singular Example	Plural Example	Gloss
Consonant Stem
C	Can	Cag	Can	miin	miinan	"blueberries"
Long-vowel Stem
CVV	CVVn	CVVg	CVVn	ajidamoo	ajidamoog	"squirrels"
CVV	CVVwan	CVVwag	CVVwan	bine	binewag	"partridges"
CVw	CVwan	CVwag	CVwan	wadow	wadowag	"bloodclots"
CVVw	CVVwan	CVVwag	CVVwan	niwiiw	niwiiwag	"my wives"
CVV	CVVyan	CVVyag	CVVyan	nimaamaa	nimaamaayag	"my mamas"
CVVnh	CVVnyan^{2}	CVVnyag^{2}	CVVnyan^{2}	giigoonh	giigoonyag	"fishes"
Short-vowel Stem
CV	CVwan	CVwag	CVwan	inini	ininiwag	"men"
CVw	CVwan	CVwag	CVwan	bigiw	bigiwan	"gums"
W Stem
C	Coon	Coog	Coon	mitig	mitigoon	"sticks"
C	Cwan	Cwag	Cwan	nigig	nigigwag	"otters"
Cwa	Cwan	Cwag	Cwan	makwa	makwag	"bears"
Cwa	Cwan	Cwag	Cwan	ikwa	ikwag	"lice"
Y Stem
C	Ciin	Ciig	Ciin	aniib	aniibiig	"elms"
Ci	Ciin	Ciig	Ciin	anwi	anwiin	"bullets
C	Cwiin	Cwiig	Cwiin	nining	niningwiin	"my armpits"
Augment Stem
C	Can	Cag	Can	ninow	ninowan	"my cheeks"
C	Coon	Coog	Coon	nikatig	nikatigoon	"my foreheads"
Ca	Cawan	Cawag	Cawan	oodena	oodenawan	"towns"
Cay	Cayan	Cayag	Cayan	omooday	omoodayan	"bottles"
C	Can	Cag	Can	nindengway	nindengwayan	"my faces"
Can	Canan	Canag	Canan	ma'iingan	ma'iinganag	"wolves"
Can	Canan	Canag	Canan	nindooskwan	nindooskwanan	"my elbows"
Cana	Canan	Canag	Canan	mikana	mikanan	"roads"
Participle Stem
C	Cin	Cig	Cin	maaniwang	maaniwangin	"fruits"
d^{3}	jin	jig	jin	naawogaaded	naawogaadejig	"quadrupeds"

1 In Central Ojibwa, Northwestern Ojibwa and Western Ojibwa, singular obviative ends with " n " while plural obviative ends with " ' ". This distinction in obviative is not made in other Ojibwe language dialects.
2 In Eastern Ojibwe language and in the Ottawa language, contemptive plurals are CVVnyig and CVVnyin instead of CVVnyag and CVVnyan.
3 In Oji-Cree language, this is a " j " and not a " d ".

=== Diminutives and contemptives ===
Diminutives in Ojibwe express an idea of something that is smaller or younger version of the noun. All diminutives are treated as a Consonant Stem when made into one of the plural forms or into the obviative form, thus taking on the linking vowel -a-. Contemptives are formed in a similar fashion as diminutives and are used to express negative or depreciative attitude the speaker may have of the noun. Contemptive plurals and obviatives remain as contemptives, but can take on the linking vowel -i- to add a possible pejorative. Many words to express fauna are often in contemptive forms. In the Ojibwemowin spoken in Wisconsin and certain areas of northwestern Ontario, often contemptives are reduced from -nh/-ny- forms to -ø/-y-; in Algonquin and in most Northwestern Ojibwe, the contemptives instead is reflected by -nzh. In Odaawaa, the frequency of contemptives in fauna are higher than in other Anishinaabemowin dialects. For example, it is from the Daawaamwin word jidmoonh ("red squirrel") where the English word "chipmunk" has its origins, while the same word in Ojibwemowin is ajidamoo. When contemptive suffix is added for terms of endearment, any other d, t, z and s in the word are changed to j, ch, zh and sh respectively.

Singular	Diminutive	Contemptive	Singular Example	Diminutive Example	Gloss
Consonant Stem
C	Cens	Cenh	miin	miinens	"little blueberry"
Long-vowel Stem
CVV	CVVns	CVVnh	ajidamoo	ajidamoons	"little squirrel"
CVV	CVVns	CVVnh	bine	binens	"little partridge"
CVw	CVns	CVnh	wadow	wadons	"little bloodclot"
CVVw	CVVns	CVVnh	niwiiw	niwiins	"my little wife"
CVV	CVVns	CVVnh	nimaamaa	nimaamaans	"my little mama"
CVVnh	CVVns	CVVnh	giigoonh	giigoons	"little fish"
Short-vowel Stem
CV	CVVns	CVVnh	inini	ininiins	"little man"
CVw	CVVns	CVVnh	bigiw	bigiins	"little gum"
W Stem
C	Coons	Coonh	mitig	mitigoons	"twig"
C	Coons	Coonh	nigig	nigigoons	"little otter"
Cwa	Coons	Coonh	makwa	makoons	"bear cub"
Cwa	Coons	Coonh	ikwa	ikoons	"little louse"
Y Stem
C	Ciins	Ciinh	aniib	aniibiins	"young elm"
Ci	Ciins	Ciinh	anwi	anwiins	"little bullet"
C	Cwiins	Cwiinh	nining	niningwiins	"my little armpit"
Augment Stem
C	Cens	Cenh	ninow	ninowens	"my little cheek"
C	Cwens	Cwenh	nikatig	nikatigwens	"my little forehead"
Ca	Cawens	Cawenh	oodena	oodenawens	"hamlet"
Cay	Cayens	Cayenh	omooday	omoodayens	"vial"
C	Caans	Caanh	nindengway	nindengwayaans	"my little face"
Can	Caans	Caanh	ma'iingan	ma'iingaans	"little wolf"
Can	Caans	Caanh	nindooskwan	nindooskwaans	"my little elbow"
Cana	Caans	Caanh	mikana	mikaans	"trail"
Participle Stem
C	Coons	Coonh	maaniwang	maaniwangoons	"little fruit"
d	doons	doonh	naawogaaded	naawogaadedoons	"little quadruped"

=== Locatives, possessives and obviation possessor theme ===
Locatives indicate a location, and are indicated with -ng. Locatives do not take on any plurals or obviative suffixes, but obviation possessor or the number can be added before the locative suffix. Another set of affixes in the Anishinaabe language is indicated by the possessive theme -m or the obviative possessor theme -ni. Generally, dependent nouns and nouns ending with either -m or -n do not take the possessive theme -m. A small group of nouns also do not ever take the possessive theme suffix.

Singular	Locative	Possessive Theme	Obviative Possessor Theme	Singular Example	Locative Example	Gloss
Consonant Stem
C	Cing	Cim	Cini	miin	miining	"by/on the blueberry"
Long-vowel Stem
CVV	CVVng	CVVm	CVVni / CVVnini	ajidamoo	ajidamoong	"by/on the squirrel"
CVV	CVVng	CVVm	CVVni / CVVwini	bine	bineng	"by/on the partridge"
CVw	CVng	CVm	CVni / CVVnini	wadow	wadong	"by/on the bloodclot"
CVVw	CVVng	CVVm	CVVni / CVVwini	niwiiw	niwiing	"by/on my wife"
CVV	CVVying	CVVm	CVVyini	nimaamaa	nimaamaaying	"by/on my mama"
CVVnh	CVVnying	CVVm	CVVnyini	giigoonh	giigoonying	"by/on the fish"
Short-vowel Stem
CV	CVVng	CVVm	CVVni / CVVnini	inini	ininiing	"by/on the man"
CVw	CVVng	CVVm	CVVni / CVVnini	bigiw	bigiing	"by/on the gum"
W Stem
C	Cong	Com	Coni / Coonini	mitig	mitigong	"by/on the tree"
C	Cong	Com	Coni / Coonini	nigig	nigigong	"by/on the otter"
Cwa	Coong	Coom	Cooni / Coonini	makwa	makoong	"by/on the bear"
Cwa	Cong	Com	Coni / Coonini	ikwa	ikong	"by/on the louse"
Y Stem
C	Ciing	Ciim	Ciini / Ciinini	aniib	aniibiing	"by/on the elm"
Ci	Ciing	Ciim	Ciini / Ciinini	anwi	anwiing	"by/on the bullet"
C	Cwiing	Cwiim	Cwiini / Cwiinini	nining	niningwiing	"by/on my armpit"
Augment Stem
C	Caang	Caam	Caani	ninow	ninowaang	"by/on my cheek"
C	Cwaang	Cwaam	Cwaani	nikatig	nikatigwaang	"by/on my forehead"
Ca	Caang	Caam	Caani	oodena	oodenawaang	"by the village"
Cay	Caang	Caam	Caani	omooday	omoodaang	"by/on the bottle"
C	Caang	Caam	Caani	nindengway	nindengwayaang	"by/on my face"
Can	Caning	Canim	Canini	ma'iingan	ma'iinganing	"by/on the wolf"
Can	Canaang	Canaam	Canaani	nindooskwan	nindooskwanaang	"by/on my elbow"
Cana	Canaang	Canaam	Canaani	mikana	mikanaang	"by/on the road"
Participle Stem
C	Cong	Com	Coni/Coyani	maaniwang	maaniwangong	"by/on the fruit"
d	dong	dom	doni/doyani	naawogaaded	naawogaadedong	"by/on the quadruped"

Rarely do either the possessive theme -m or the obviative possessor theme -ni stand by themselves. The above examples for the possessive theme -m were for the first person singular. For other persons or number, again using the possessive theme -m as an example, the word is conjugated as following:

Subject	Possessive																						
Subject	Conjugation																					3s Example	Gloss
Subject	3s Possessum			3p Possessum			3' Possessum			3" Possessum^{4}			0s Possessum			0p Possessum			Locative Possessum			3s Example	Gloss
Giin (2s)	g	_	m	g	_	mag	g	_	man	g	_	manan	g	_	m	g	_	man	g	_	ming	gizhiishiibim	"your (sg.) duck"
Giinawaa (2p)	g	_	miwaa	g	_	miwaag	g	_	miwaan	g	_	miwaanan	g	_	miwaa	g	_	miwaa(n)^{2}	g	_	miwaang	gizhiishiibimiwaa	"your (pl.) duck"
Giinawind (21)	g	_	minaan	g	_	minaanig^{1}	g	_	minaanin	g	_	minaaninan	g	_	minaan	g	_	minaanin^{1}	g	_	minaaning	gizhiishiibiminaan	"our (inclusive) duck"
Niinawind (1p)	n	_	minaan	n	_	minaanig^{1}	n	_	minaanin	n	_	minaaninan	n	_	minaan	n	_	minaanin^{1}	n	_	minaaning	nizhiishiibiminaan	"our (exclusive) duck"
Niin (1s)	n	_	m	n	_	mag	n	_	man	n	_	manan	n	_	m	n	_	man	n	_	ming	nizhiishiibim	"my duck"
Wiin (3s)							w	_	man	w	_	manan	w	_	m	w	_	man	w	_	ming	ozhiishiibiman	"his/her/its duck"
Wiinawaa (3p)							w	_	miwaan	w	_	miwaanan	w	_	miwaa(n)^{2,3}	w	_	miwaa(n)^{2}	w	_	miwaang	ozhiishiibimiwaan	"their duck"
Obviative (3'(s/p))	w	_	mini(in)^{5}										w	_	mini(in)^{5,6}	w	_	miniwan^{7}					

^{1} In the Algonquin, the plural suffix remains as -an/-ag, rather than becoming -in/-ig.
^{2} Terminal -n is not found in Algonquin language.
^{3} Terminal -n is not found in Potawatomi, Eastern Ojibwe and Ottawa languages.
^{4} In the Potawatomi language
^{5} -in is used in Algonquin and Oji-Cree (Severn Ojibwe) languages
^{6} Only in Algonquin and in OjiCree is the inanimate possessed by an obviate marked.
^{7} Historically

=== Pejoratives and vocative plurals ===
Pejoratives, marked with the -sh suffix, generally indicates a stronger negative feelings a speaker may have than that of the contemptive. However, pejorative may also indicate a term of affection. Some words take on different meaning in the pejorative, such as aniibiish, which means "no good elm" but also means "leaf". In some dialects, some words are always shown in their pejorative forms, such as animosh for "dog".

Vocative plurals mimic pejorative conjugation patterns. It is identified with the -dog suffix, which in the Ottawa dialect shows up instead as -dig suffix.

Singular	Affective	Pejorative	Vocative Plural	Singular Example	Pejorative Example	Gloss
Consonant Stem
C	Cis	Cish	Cidog	miin	miinish	"no good blueberry"
Long-vowel Stem
CVV	CVVs	CVVsh	CVVdog	ajidamoo	ajidamoosh	"no good squirrel"
CVV	CVVs	CVVsh	CVVdog	bine	binesh	"no good partridge"
CVw	CVs	CVsh	CVdog	wadow	wadosh	"no good bloodclot"
CVVw	CVVs	CVVsh	CVVdog	niwiiw	niwiish	"my no good wife"
CVV	CVVs	CVVsh	CVVdog	nimaamaa	nimaamaash	"my no good mama"
CVVnh	CVVs	CVVsh	CVVdog	giigoonh	giigoosh	"no good fish"
Short-vowel Stem
CV	CVwis	CVwish	CVwidog	inini	ininiwish	"no good man"
CVw	CVwis	CVwish	CVwidog	bigiw	bigiwish	"no good gum"
W Stem
C	Cos	Cosh	Codog	mitig	mitigosh	"no good tree"
C	Cos	Cosh	Codog	nigig	nigigosh	"no good otter"
Cwa	Coos	Coosh	Coodog	makwa	makoosh	"no good bear"
Cwa	Cos	Cosh	Codog	ikwa	ikosh	"no good louse"
Y Stem
C	Ciis	Ciish	Ciidog	aniib	aniibiish	"no good elm"
Ci	Ciis	Ciish	Ciidog	anwi	anwiish	"no good bullet"
C	Cwiis	Cwiish	Cwiidog	nining	niningwiish	"my lousy armpit"
Augment Stem
C	Caas	Caash	Caadog	ninow	ninowaash	"my no good cheek"
C	Cwaas	Cwaash	Cwaadog	nikatig	nikatigwaash	"my no good forehead"
Ca	Caas	Caash	Caadog	oodena	oodenawaash	"damn village"
Cay	Caas	Caash	Caadog	omooday	omoodaash	"no good bottle"
C	Caas	Caash	Caadog	nindengway	nindengwayaash	"my no good face"
Can	Canis	Canish	Canidog	ma'iingan	ma'iinganish	"no good wolf"
Can	Canaas	Canaash	Canaadog	nindooskwan	nindooskwanaash	"my no good elbow"
Cana	Canaas	Canaash	Canaadog	mikana	mikanaash	"no good road"
Participle Stem
C	Cos	Cosh	Cidog	maaniwang	maaniwangosh	"no good fruit"
d	dos	dosh	jidog	naawogaaded	naawogaadedosh	"no good quadruped"

When the diminutive suffix ens or the affective suffix is, is followed by the other, the s becomes z, as in izens or enzis. When the pejorative suffix ish is added to the diminutive suffix ens, combination yields enzhish, while adding the diminutive suffix ens to the pejorative suffix ish, just as with any other Consonant Stem patterns, yields ishens. In Northwestern Ojibwe dialect when the pejorative suffix ish is added, any other d, t, z and s in the word are changed to j, ch, zh and sh respectively.

Singular vocatives do not follow a systematic pattern like plural vocatives do, with various strategies in achieving the vocative case:

nominative	vocative	gloss	mechanism for vocative
noos	noose!	my father	adding a vowel
Aanji-binesi	Aanji-bines!	Changing Bird	dropping the final vowel
Noodinookwe	Noodinook!	Wind-woman	dropping the final vowel and medial w
ningashi	ninga!	my mother	dropping the final vowel and affective suffix
ningwizis	ningwis!	my son	dropping of affective suffix
nookomis	nooko!	my grandmother	dropping of affective suffix and the possessive theme m
noozhishenh	noozis!	my grandchild	dropping of contemptive suffix and de-palatalize effected affective suffix consonants

However, many irregular forms of achieving the vocative case also exist, including in some dialects unchanged forms such as noozhishenh! (my grandchild) used as a vocative, and vocative beyond the regular changed forms such as ninge! (my mother).

== Adjectives ==
Ojibwe has no adjectives per se but verbs that function as adjectives. Thus, instead of saying "the flower is blue," Ojibwe says something like to "the flower blues" (ozhaawashkwaa waabigwan) or "be a blueing flower" (waabigwan-ozhaawashkwaa). Ojibwe has a copula, in some situations, which has a verb (several, in fact) that can be translated as "to be" and used in situations to equate one thing with another. However, a copula is not always used in Ojibwe, such as if demonstrative pronouns are used (jiimaan o'ow, "this is a canoe").

== Adverbs ==
=== Particles ===
Ojibwe language with its iambic accent system and relatively atonal word stresses, has any nuance of expressing word emphasis, stress, mood, etc., being expressed by particles like these:

- mii — discourse sequencer, topical focuser
- (i)dash — topical shift indicator; may even appear as -sh
- (i)go — emphasises heightened assertiveness
- (i)sa — emphasises novelty
- (i)sha — emphasises contradiction
- (i)maa — emphasises cooperation (either actual or desired)
- (i)naa — emphasises evaluative information
- wii — unexpectedness indicator

The short initial 'i' is omitted typically when following a word or particle ending in a vowel or ending in 'n'.

Other particles may be interjections like these:

- ambe — "come on..."
- (a)tayaa — "indeed"
- (a)was — "go away"
- boozhoo — "hello"
- enh — "yes"
- gaawiin — "no"
- (i)kawe — "hold on..."
- miigwech — "thank you"

The short initial vowel may be omitted typically in excited speech.

=== Counting ===
Ojibwe numbers are classified as a biquinary base-10 system.

Ones				Hundreds			
1	bezhig [(n)ingod^{1,3,8}]	6	(n)ingodwaaswi^{3,7}	100	midaasimidana^{7} / (n)ingodwaak^{3}	600	(n)ingodwaaswaak^{3}
2	niizh	7	niizhwaaswi^{7}	200	niizhwaak	700	niizhwaaswaak
3	niswi	8	(n)ishwaaswi^{3,7}	300	niswaak	800	(n)ishwaaswaak^{3}
4	niiwin^{4}	9	zhaangaswi^{6,7}	400	niiwaak	900	zhaangaswaak
5	naanan	10	midaaswi^{7}	500	naanwaak	1,000	midaaswaak
Tens				Thousands			
10	midaaswi^{7} [(n)ingodana^{1}]	60	(n)ingodwaasimidana^{3,5,7}	1,000	midaaswaak [(n)ingodanaak^{1,3}]	6,000	(n)ingodwaasimidanaak^{3,5,7}
20	niishtana [niizh((m)i)dana^{2}]	70	niizhwaasimidana^{5,7}	2,000	niishtanaak	7,000	niizhwaasimidanaak^{5,7}
30	nisimidana^{5}	80	(n)ishwaasimidana^{3,5,7}	3,000	nisimidanaak^{5}	8,000	(n)ishwaasimidanaak^{3,5,7}
40	niimidana^{4}	90	zhaangasimidana^{5,7}	4,000	niimidanaak	9,000	zhaangasimidanaak^{5,7}
50	naanimidana^{5}	100	midaasimidana^{5,7}	5,000	naanimidanaak^{5}	10,000	midaasimidanaak^{5,7}

^{1} In theory
^{2} Historically, either niizh midana or niizhidana.
^{3} Many speakers omit the initial n (shown in parentheses).
^{4} In Algonquin and Algonquin-influenced communities, new and newin midana are used instead of niiwin and niimidana, respectively.
^{5} In Northwestern Ojibwe, Oji-cree, and Algonquin, o is used instead of i as the connector vowel for the suffixes -midana and -midanaak.
^{6} In some dialects, such as in parts of Eastern Ojibwe, zhaang is used instead of zhaangaswi; the shorter form was historically recorded as being the more pervasive form, but it now is rarely used.
^{7} Richard Rhodes reports that some Algonquin speakers use a connector, -di, before -swi, -somidana, and -somidanaak.
^{8} (n)ingod is "one" in Potawatomi but "something" in Ojibwe.

== Modifications of sound ==
Ojibwe initials of words may experience morphological changes under three modification strategies: initial consonant change, initial vowel change and initial syllable reduplication.

=== Initial consonant change ===
Ojibwe consonants are divided into lenis and fortis values:

- lenis-fortis pairs: ′ – h (if distinguished), b – p, d – t, g – k, j – ch, z – s, zh – sh
- unpaired fortis: h (if not distinguished), m, n, w, y

When either the past tense preverb gii'- or the desiritive future tense wii'- is added to a verb, if the verb begins with a lenis consonant, it may change to its fortis counterpart; it is common for many writers to omit the writing of the glottal stop, so they graphically indicate this consonant shift by writing the fortis consonant counterpart. In some dialects, such as with the Red Lake Ojibwe in Minnesota, this rule is suspended if the consonant in the verb's second syllable already contains a fortis consonant. In some dialects as in Odaawaa, this rule is not applied.

Ojibwe (without gii-)	English	Ojibwe (with gii-)	English	Comment
ayekozi	he/she is tired	gii-ayekozi	he/she was tired	not applicable, as this word begins with a vowel
nibaa	he/she sleeps	gii-nibaa	he/she slept	initial consonant is already a fortis
jiibaakwe	he/she cooks	gii-chiibaakwe	he/she cooked	initial consonant changes to its fortis counterpart
jaka'ige	he/she pokes	gii-jaka'ige	he/she poked	Red Lake: initial consonant is not changed due to a fortis consonant (in this case, k) in the second syllable
zhaabobide	he/she drives through	gii-zhaabobide	he/she drove through	Odaawaa: this dialect does not implement the initial consonant change

=== Initial vowel change ===
In general, verbs in Conjunct and Participial orders and nouns of Subjunctive order change the vowel quality of the first syllable in the manner shown in the table below.

unchanged	changed
-a-	-e-
-aa-	-ayaa-
-e-	-aye-
-i-	-e-
-ii-	-aa-
-o-	-we-
-oo-	-waa-

However, in some words beginning in dan-, dazh-, das-, dash- or daa- instead take on the prefix en- to form endan-, endazh-, endas-, endash- or endaa-. The directional prefix bi-, meaning "over here," instead becomes ba-.

=== Initial syllable reduplication ===
Words typically conveying repetitive actions have their very first syllable experience reduplication. Reduplication may be found in both verbs and in nouns. Vowel syncope process Eastern Ojibwe and Odaawaa experiences happen after the word has gone through reduplication. The most general reduplication pattern for the initial syllable is C_{1}V_{1} → C_{1}V_{2}C_{2}V_{1} but the table below shows the most common reduplication strategies.

unchanged	reduplicated	unchanged	reduplicated
a-	aya-	Ca-	CaCa-
aa-	aayaa-	Caa-	CaaCaa-
e-	eye-	Ce-	CeCe-
i-	ayi-	Ci-	CaCi- or CeCi-
ii-	aayii-	Cii-	CaaCii- or CeCii- or CiiCii-
o- (reduced from *wa)	wawe- or waye-	Co-	CaCe-
o- (reduced from *wi)	wawo-^{1} or wawi-	Co-	CaCo-
oo-	oo'oo-	Coo-	CaaCoo- or CeCoo- or CooCoo-

^{1} ayo- in Algonquin.

In some words, the reduplicated consonant shifts from their lenis value to their fortis value. Yet in some stems, initial Cw- retains the -w- while others do not. Those words experiencing the prefix en- may change to in- before experiencing reduplication. Other prefixes such as gino- (long) does not follow the typical C_{1}V_{1} → C_{1}V_{2}C_{2}V_{1} pattern, and instead becomes gagaano-.

== Syntax ==
As Ojibwe is highly synthetic, word order and sentence structure is relatively free, since a great deal of information is already encoded onto the verb. The subject can go before or after the verb, as can the object; however, the subject and the object together cannot go before the verb. In general, whichever participant is deemed more important or in-focus by the speaker is placed first, before the verb, and the less important participant follows the verb. Ojibwe tends to prefer a VS order (verb–subject) when subjects are specified with separate nominals or pronouns (e.g., bakade a'aw asabikeshiinh, be.hungry that.there.ANIMATE net.make.PEJORATIVE.CONTEMPTIVE, "that spider is hungry").

== See also ==
- Anishinaabe language
