= Ojibwe dialects =

Language complex

The Ojibwe language is spoken in a series of dialects occupying adjacent territories, forming a language complex in which mutual intelligibility between adjacent dialects may be comparatively high but declines between some non-adjacent dialects. Mutual intelligibility between some non-adjacent dialects, notably Ottawa, Severn Ojibwe, and Algonquin, is low enough that they could be considered distinct languages. There is no single dialect that is considered the most prestigious or most prominent, and no standard writing system that covers all dialects. The relative autonomy of the regional dialects of Ojibwe is associated with an absence of linguistic or political unity among Ojibwe-speaking groups.

The general name for the language in Ojibwe is /anɪʃːɪnaːpeːmowɪn/, written in one common orthography as Anishinaabemowin and as ᐊᓂᐦᔑᓈᐯᒧᐎᓐ in 'Eastern' syllabics, with local pronunciation and spelling variants, and in some cases distinctive local names for particular dialects. The dialects of Ojibwe are spoken in Canada from western Québec, through Ontario, Manitoba and parts of Saskatchewan, with outlying communities in Alberta and British Columbia, and in the United States from Michigan through Wisconsin and Minnesota, with a number of communities in North Dakota and Montana, as well as migrant groups in Kansas and Oklahoma. The dialects of Ojibwe are divided into distinctive northern and southern groups, with intervening transition dialects that have a mixture of features from the adjacent dialects.

This article lays out the general structure of Ojibwe dialectology, with links to separate articles on each dialect. The Potawatomi language is closely related to Ojibwe; information is at Ojibwe language: Relationship of Ojibwe and Potawatomi. An Ojibwe pidgin language is discussed at Broken Oghibbeway, and the use of various dialects of Ojibwe as lingua franca is at Ojibwe language: Lingua franca. Ojibwe borrowed words are found in Menominee and Michif; for discussion see Ojibwe language: Ojibwe influence on other languages.

== Classification ==
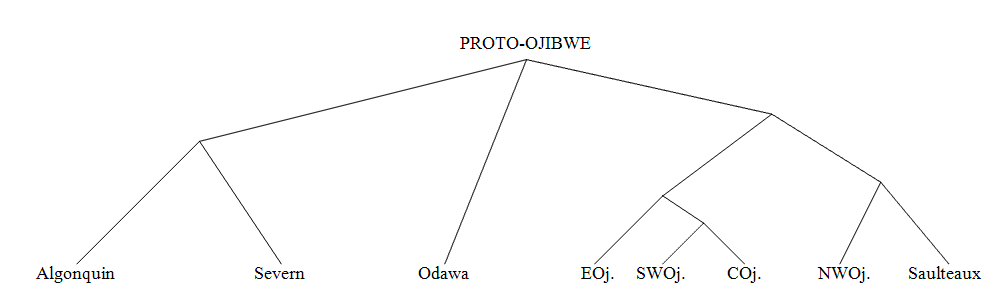
The subgrouping of Ojibwe dialects based on lexical innovations and mutual intelligibility (rather than morphology or pronunciation). EOj = Eastern Ojibwe; SWOj = Southwestern Ojibwe; COj = Central Ojibwe; NWOj = North(western) Ojibwe.

The recognized dialects of Ojibwe are spoken in the region surrounding the Great Lakes, in Ontario, Minnesota, Wisconsin, and Michigan, with other groups of speakers in western Québec in the area along the Québec-Ontario border, Manitoba, Saskatchewan, and a few communities in Alberta, North Dakota, Montana, British Columbia, Oklahoma and Kansas. While there is some variation in the classification of Ojibwe dialects, at a minimum the following are recognized, proceeding west to east: Western Ojibwe (Saulteaux), Southwestern Ojibwe (Chippewa), Northwestern Ojibwe, Severn Ojibwe (Oji-Cree), Ottawa (Odawa), Eastern Ojibwe, and Algonquin. Field research conducted in the 1980s and 1990s led to the recognition of several other dialects: (a) Berens Ojibwe along the Berens River in northwestern Ontario, to be distinguished from Northwestern Ojibwe; (b) Border Lakes Ojibwe, in western Ontario in the area bounded by the borders of Ontario, Manitoba, and Minnesota; (c) North of (Lake) Superior; and (d) Nipissing. Some sources recognize a Central Ojibwe dialect, covering approximately the same territory as North of (Lake) Superior and Nipissing. In this article the analysis in which Central Ojibwe is not recognized is accepted.

Two analyses of the relationships between the Ojibwe dialects are in agreement on the assignment of the strongly differentiated Ottawa dialect to a separate subgroup, and the assignment of Severn Ojibwe and Algonquin to another subgroup, and differ primarily with respect to the relationships between the less strongly differentiated dialects. Rhodes and Todd recognize several different dialectal subgroupings within Ojibwe: (a) Ottawa; (b) Severn and Algonquin; (c) a third subgroup which is further divided into (i) a subgrouping of Northwestern Ojibwe and Saulteaux, and a subgrouping consisting of Eastern Ojibwe and a further subgrouping comprising Southwestern Ojibwe and Central Ojibwe (see figure, this section).

Valentine has proposed that Ojibwe dialects are divided into three groups: a northern tier consisting of Severn Ojibwe and Algonquin; a southern tier consisting of "Odawa, Chippewa, Eastern Ojibwe, the Ojibwe of the Border Lakes region between Minnesota and Ontario, and Saulteaux; and third, a transitional zone between these two polar groups, in which there is a mixture of northern and southern features." In this article the classification proposed by Valentine is utilized for the classification and subgrouping of Ojibwe dialects.

The distinction between the northern and southern dialect groupings is argued to "align to some extent with traditional subsistence patterns, in that the southern groups typically harvested maple sugar and wild rice, allowing for population aggregations that promoted such social institutions as medicine societies and totemic clan structures." Similarly, northern groups have made most extensive use of northern "waterways that flow into James and Hudson Bays, while southern groups were situated on the Great Lakes, Huron and Superior."

Ojibwe dialects are distinguished by features of phonology, morphology, syntax, and lexicon. Some dialects, most notably Severn Ojibwe, Algonquin, and Ottawa are characterized by many distinct features; such extensive differentiation is associated with lengthy "periods of isolation from other varieties of Ojibwe". Dialects that are adjacent to strongly differentiated dialects may show a mixture of transitional features. For example, the Border Lakes dialect is not strongly distinguished from the adjacent Western Ojibwe (Saulteaux) and Southwestern Ojibwe (Chippewa) dialects, and is characterized by the "grading of a few minor features."

In some situations there is a mismatch between speakers' self-designations and what is supported by linguistic data. For example, the communities at Golden Lake, Ontario and Maniwaki, Quebec are described by speakers at those locations as members of the Algonquin dialect, although linguistically both are distinct from the clearly Algonquin communities north of those locations, and are assigned to the Nipissing dialect.

The degree of mutually intelligibility between nonadjacent dialects of Ojibwe varies considerably; recent research has helped to show the extent of the distance between Ottawa and the maximally different Severn Ojibwe dialect spoken in northwestern Ontario. Because the dialects of Ojibwe are at least partly mutually intelligible, Ojibwe is usually considered to be a single language with a number of dialects. However, the relatively low degrees of mutual intelligibility between some nonadjacent Ojibwe dialects led to the suggestion that Ojibwe "...could be said to consist of several languages...".

== Northern dialects ==
The Northern dialects of Ojibwe are Severn Ojibwe and Algonquin; they are strongly differentiated from other dialects of Ojibwe. A set of features characterise the northern dialects, and are found to varying degrees in adjacent transition dialects.

=== Severn Ojibwe ===
Ethnologue entry and ISO 639-3 code: OJS (Severn Ojibwe)

Severn Ojibwe, also called Oji-Cree or Northern Ojibwa, and Anihshininiimowin in the language itself, is spoken in northern Ontario and northern Manitoba. Although there is a significant increment of vocabulary borrowed from several Cree dialects, Severn Ojibwe is a dialect of Ojibwe. Two minor sub-dialects have been identified: Big Trout Lake, and Deer Lake, with Big Trout Lake being further subdivided into a Severn subgroup and a Winisk River subgroup. Severn Ojibwe is primarily written by its speakers using the Cree syllabary.

=== Algonquin ===
Ethnologue entry and ISO 639-3 code: ALQ (Algonquin)

The Algonquin dialect of Ojibwe is spoken in communities in northwestern Quebec and eastern Ontario (to be distinguished from the name of the Algonquian language family). Algonquin is spoken along the Ottawa River valley east of the Quebec-Ontario border, centered around Lake Abitibi. Recognized Algonquin communities include: Amos (Pikogan), Cadillac, Grand Lac Victoria, Hunter's Point, Kipawa (Eagle Village), Notre Dame du Nord (Timiskaming), Rapid Lake (Barriere Lake), Rapid Sept, Lac Simon, Québec, Winneway (Long Point). The communities of Grand Lac Victoria (Kitcisakik) on Grand Lac Victoria and Lac Rapide on Cabonga Reservoir are within La Vérendrye Wildlife Reserve, a provincial park in Québec.

Algonquin is sometimes referred to as 'Northern Algonquin' to distinguish it from the southern communities at Golden Lake, Ontario and Maniwaki, Québec which have traditionally been grouped with Algonquin, but are here classified as belonging to the Nipissing dialect.

Although speakers of Ojibwe in the community of Kitigan Zibi (also called River Desert and formerly called Maniwaki) at Maniwaki, Québec self-identify as Algonquin, the language spoken there is Nipissing; Maniwaki speakers were among those who migrated from Oka, Quebec. Similarly, the nineteenth-century missionary Grammaire de la language algonquine ('Grammar of the Algonquin language') describes Nipissing speech.

Algonquin orthography is not standardized. Some older texts were written in a French-based orthography in which the acute accent is used to indicate vowel length and the use of several consonant symbols accords with their general French values. Modern Algonquin-language resources tend to use a more English-based system, in which long vowels are marked with a grave accent (or alternatively by doubling the vowel).

The Nipissing dialect term omàmìwininì 'downriver people' refers to Algonquin speakers, with the term for the language being omàmìwininìmowin. The general Algonquin self-designation is Anicinàbe or orthographic equivalent Anishinàbe.

There is support for a Western Algonquin subdialect, extending "…inland from Lake Huron and east of Lake Superior…" toward the Ontario-Québec border. Representative communities from this area include Temagami, Ontario and Biscotasing, Ontario.

== Southern dialects ==
The southern dialects are presented east to west.

=== Ottawa ===
Ethnologue entry and ISO 639-3 code: OTW (Ottawa)

The Ottawa dialect is spoken in southern Ontario and northern Michigan, with main communities on Manitoulin Island, Ontario; at Walpole Island, Ontario; as well as Saugeen and Cape Croker. Ottawa and the neighboring Eastern Ojibwe dialect are characterized by extensive vowel Syncope, which deletes metrically weak short vowels.

The most general term for the Ottawa dialect is Nishnaabemwin, which is also applied to Eastern Ojibwe. The term Daawaamwin '(speaking the) Ottawa language' is also used to refer specifically to Ottawa.

Ottawa is generally written with a version of the Double vowel writing system.

=== Eastern Ojibwe ===
Ethnologue entry and ISO 639-3 code: OJG (Eastern Ojibwe)

The Eastern Ojibwe dialect is spoken east of Georgian Bay, Ontario. The main Eastern Ojibwe communities are Curve Lake, Ontario and Rama, Ontario. Eastern Ojibwe and the neighboring Ottawa dialect are characterized by extensive vowel Syncope, which deletes metrically weak short vowels.

The most general term for the Eastern Ojibwe dialect is Nishnaabemwin, which is also applied to Ottawa. The term Jibwemwin '(speaking the) Ojibwe language' is not restricted to a specific dialect; a recent Eastern Ojibwe dictionary notes that Jibwemwin and Nishnaabemwin are interchangeable.

Eastern Ojibwe is generally written with a version of the Double vowel writing system.

=== Southwestern Ojibwe ===
Ethnologue entry and ISO 639-3 code: CIW (Southwestern Ojibwe ("Chippewa"))

Southwestern Ojibwe is spoken in Minnesota and Wisconsin. This dialect is also referred in English as "Chippewa". The general Ojibwe term Anishinaabemowin is applied to this dialect. Southwestern Ojibwe is most generally written using the Double vowel writing system.

=== Border Lakes ===
There is no Ethnologue entry or ISO 639-3 code for this dialect of Ojibwe.

Border Lakes Ojibwe is spoken in the Lake of the Woods area of Ontario near the borders of Ontario, Minnesota, and Manitoba. Although communities within the Border Lakes area have been considered part of the Saulteaux dialect, current classification treats Border Lakes as a separate dialect in the Southern tier. Communities identified as Border Lakes include Lac La Croix, Emo (Rainy River First Nation), and Whitefish Bay, all in Ontario.

=== Saulteaux ===
Ethnologue entry and ISO 639-3 code: OJW (Plains Ojibwe/Saulteaux ("Western Ojibwe"))

Saulteaux Ojibwe (also Western Ojibwe or Plains Ojibwe) is spoken in the Canadian provinces of Manitoba, Saskatchewan, and Alberta, with an outlying group in British Columbia. The language is referred to, as written in the local orthography, Anihšināpēmowin, Nahkawēwin, or Nahkawēmowin (as written in the local system).

The writing system commonly used for Saulteaux incorporates the Americanist phonetic symbols /š/ for /ʃ/ and /č/ for /tʃ/; marks long vowels with the macron; writes lenis consonants with voiceless symbols, and writes fortis consonants with /h/ before a lenis consonant, as in the name for the language, Anihšināpēmowin.

== Transition dialects ==
The transition dialects are listed east to west.

Nipissing communities have sometimes been classified as Eastern Ojibwe, but other research notes that several features distinguish the dialect documented at Gitigan Zibi (Maniwaki) from Eastern Ojibwe material documented from the core Eastern Ojibwe communities of Curve Lake and Rama.

=== Nipissing ===
There is no Ethnologue entry or ISO 639-3 code for the Nipissing dialect of Ojibwe.

The Nipissing dialect of Ojibwe is spoken in the area of Lake Nipissing in Ontario. A representative community in the Nipissing dialect area is Golden Lake, although the language is moribund at that location. Although speakers of Ojibwe in the community of Kitigan Zibi (also called River Desert) at Maniwaki, Québec self-identify as Algonquin, the language spoken there is Nipissing. Maniwaki speakers were among those who migrated from Oka, Quebec. Similarly, the nineteenth-century missionary Grammaire de la language algonquine ('Grammar of the Algonquin language') describes Nipissing speech.

The term odishkwaagamii 'those at the end of the lake' is attributed to Algonquin speakers as a term for Nipissing dialect speakers, with related odishkwaagamiimowin 'Nipissing language'. It is also cited from Ojibwe dialects other than Nipissing or Algonquin with the meaning 'Algonquin Indian', for example from Southwestern Ojibwe; other sources ranging from the seventeenth to nineteenth centuries cite the same form from several different Ojibwe dialects, including Ottawa.

Speakers of this dialect generally use a French-based writing system.

=== North of Superior ===
There is no Ethnologue entry or ISO 639-3 code for the North of Superior dialect of Ojibwe.

The North of Superior dialect is spoken on the north shore of Lake Superior in the area to the west and east of Lake Nipigon. Communities include (east to west) Pic Mobert, Pic Heron, Pays Plat, Long Lac, Aroland, Rocky Bay, and Lake Helen, all in Ontario.

=== Berens River Ojibwe ===
There is no Ethnologue entry or ISO 639-3 code for the Berens River dialect of Ojibwe.

Berens River Ojibwe is spoken along the Berens River in northern Ontario. Reported communities include Pikangikum and Poplar Hill, both in Ontario.

=== Northwestern Ojibwe ===
Ethnologue entry and ISO 639-3 code: OJB (Northwestern Ojibwe)

The Northwestern dialect of Ojibwe is spoken approximately from northwest of Lake Nipigon, north of the Lake of the Woods area south of the Berens River to the Manitoba border. Communities identified as Northwestern include (east to west) Armstrong, Osnaburgh House, Cat Lake, Lac Seul, Grassy Narrows, and Red Lake.

== Dialect not recognized in this analysis ==
=== Central Ojibwe ===
Ethnologue entry and ISO 639-3 code: OJC (Central Ojibwe)

The Central Ojibwe dialect (also known as Central Ojibwe, Ojibway) is recognized in some analyses as a dialect of Ojibwe spoken in Ontario from Lake Nipigon in the west to Lake Nipissing in the east. In the analysis accepted in this article Central Ojibwe is not recognized; it is divided into North of (Lake) Superior and Nipissing.

== Language code correspondence table ==
=== In literature ===
This article and related articles			Ethnologue			Linguasphere			Moseley			Glottolog					
Potawatomi		Northern Potawatomi	pot Potawatomi			62-ADA-d; Ojibwa+ Anissinapek	62-ADA-dc; Potawatomi		Potawatomi			ojib1240 Ojibwa-Potawatomi	pota1247 Potawatomi				
Potawatomi		Southern Potawatomi	pot Potawatomi			62-ADA-d; Ojibwa+ Anissinapek	62-ADA-dc; Potawatomi		Potawatomi			ojib1240 Ojibwa-Potawatomi	pota1247 Potawatomi				
Ojibwe	Severn Ojibwe	Eastern Big Trout	oji Ojibwa	ojs Ojibwa, Severn	Winisk River Ojibwa	62-ADA-d; Ojibwa+ Anissinapek	62-ADA-dh; Ojibwa-Northern	62-ADA-dha; Ojibwa-Northeastern	Ojibwe	Severn Ojibwe (Oji-Cree)		ojib1240 Ojibwa-Potawatomi	ojib1241 Ojibwa	seve1242 Severn-Algonquin	seve1240 Severn Ojibwa	wini1244 Winisk River Ojibwa	
Ojibwe	Severn Ojibwe	Western Big Trout	oji Ojibwa	ojs Ojibwa, Severn	Severn River Ojibwa	62-ADA-d; Ojibwa+ Anissinapek	62-ADA-dh; Ojibwa-Northern	62-ADA-dha; Ojibwa-Northeastern	Ojibwe	Severn Ojibwe (Oji-Cree)		ojib1240 Ojibwa-Potawatomi	ojib1241 Ojibwa	seve1242 Severn-Algonquin	seve1240 Severn Ojibwa	seve1241 Severn River Ojibwa	
Ojibwe	Severn Ojibwe	Deer Lake	oji Ojibwa	ojs Ojibwa, Severn	Severn River Ojibwa	62-ADA-d; Ojibwa+ Anissinapek	62-ADA-dh; Ojibwa-Northern	62-ADA-dha; Ojibwa-Northeastern	Ojibwe	Severn Ojibwe (Oji-Cree)		ojib1240 Ojibwa-Potawatomi	ojib1241 Ojibwa	seve1242 Severn-Algonquin	seve1240 Severn Ojibwa	seve1241 Severn River Ojibwa	
Ojibwe	Severn Ojibwe	Island Lake	oji Ojibwa	ojs Ojibwa, Severn	Severn River Ojibwa	62-ADA-d; Ojibwa+ Anissinapek	62-ADA-dh; Ojibwa-Northern	62-ADA-dhb; Ojibwa-Northwestern	Ojibwe	Severn Ojibwe (Oji-Cree)		ojib1240 Ojibwa-Potawatomi	ojib1241 Ojibwa	seve1242 Severn-Algonquin	seve1240 Severn Ojibwa	seve1241 Severn River Ojibwa	
Ojibwe	Algonquin	N/A	alq Algonquin		N/A	62-ADA-d; Ojibwa+ Anissinapek	62-ADA-db; Anissinapek		Ojibwe	Old Algonquin		ojib1240 Ojibwa-Potawatomi	ojib1241 Ojibwa	seve1242 Severn-Algonquin	algo1255 Algonquin	algo1255 Algonquin	
Ojibwe	Algonquin	Northern Algonquin	alq Algonquin		Northern Algonquin (various)	62-ADA-d; Ojibwa+ Anissinapek	62-ADA-db; Anissinapek		Ojibwe	Northern Algonquin		ojib1240 Ojibwa-Potawatomi	ojib1241 Ojibwa	seve1242 Severn-Algonquin	algo1255 Algonquin	algo1255 Algonquin	
Ojibwe	Algonquin	Western Algonquin	alq Algonquin		Northern Algonquin (various)	62-ADA-d; Ojibwa+ Anissinapek	62-ADA-db; Anissinapek		Ojibwe	Northern Algonquin		ojib1240 Ojibwa-Potawatomi	ojib1241 Ojibwa	seve1242 Severn-Algonquin	algo1255 Algonquin	algo1255 Algonquin	
Ojibwe	Nipissing Ojibwe	Maniwaki Algonquin	alq Algonquin		Maniwaki Algonquin	62-ADA-d; Ojibwa+ Anissinapek	62-ADA-db; Anissinapek		Ojibwe	Southern Algonquin (Nipissing Algonquin)		ojib1240 Ojibwa-Potawatomi	ojib1241 Ojibwa	seve1242 Severn-Algonquin	algo1255 Algonquin	mini1254 Miniwaki	
Ojibwe	Nipissing Ojibwe	Nipissing Ojibwe	oji Ojibwa (cont'd)	ojc Ojibwa, Central		62-ADA-d; Ojibwa+ Anissinapek	62-ADA-de; Ojibwa-Eastern		Ojibwe	Nishnaabemwin	Eastern Ojibwe	ojib1240 Ojibwa-Potawatomi	ojib1241 Ojibwa	nucl1723 Nuclear Ojibwa	cent2252 Central-Eastern- Southwestern; Ojibwa	cent2136 Central Ojibwa	
Ojibwe	North of Superior Ojibwe		oji Ojibwa (cont'd)	ojc Ojibwa, Central		62-ADA-d; Ojibwa+ Anissinapek	62-ADA-de; Ojibwa-Eastern		Ojibwe	Nishnaabemwin	Eastern Ojibwe	ojib1240 Ojibwa-Potawatomi	ojib1241 Ojibwa	nucl1723 Nuclear Ojibwa	cent2252 Central-Eastern- Southwestern; Ojibwa	cent2136 Central Ojibwa	
Ojibwe	Eastern Ojibwe		oji Ojibwa (cont'd)	ojg Ojibwa, Eastern		62-ADA-d; Ojibwa+ Anissinapek	62-ADA-de; Ojibwa-Eastern		Ojibwe	Nishnaabemwin	Eastern Ojibwe	ojib1240 Ojibwa-Potawatomi	ojib1241 Ojibwa	nucl1723 Nuclear Ojibwa	cent2252 Central-Eastern- Southwestern; Ojibwa	east2542 Eastern Ojibwa	
Ojibwe	Ottawa	Chippewa-Ottawa	oji Ojibwa (cont'd)	otw Ottawa		62-ADA-d; Ojibwa+ Anissinapek	62-ADA-dd; Odawa		Ojibwe	Nishnaabemwin	Ottawa/Odawa	ojib1240 Ojibwa-Potawatomi	ojib1241 Ojibwa	otta1242 Ottawa			
Ojibwe	Ottawa	Ottawa-Ottawa	oji Ojibwa (cont'd)	otw Ottawa		62-ADA-d; Ojibwa+ Anissinapek	62-ADA-dd; Odawa		Ojibwe	Nishnaabemwin	Ottawa/Odawa	ojib1240 Ojibwa-Potawatomi	ojib1241 Ojibwa	otta1242 Ottawa			
Ojibwe	Broken Oghibbeway		oji Ojibwa (cont'd)	N/A		62-ADA-d; Ojibwa+ Anissinapek	62-ADA-da; Algonquin-Vehicular		Ojibwe	N/A		ojib1240 Ojibwa-Potawatomi	ojib1241 Ojibwa	nucl1723 Nuclear Ojibwa (cont'd)	cent2252 Central-Eastern- Southwestern; Ojibwa (cont'd)	brok1252 Broken Oghibbeway	
Ojibwe	Southwestern Ojibwe		oji Ojibwa (cont'd)	ciw Chippewa	Upper Michigan- Wisconsin; Chippewa	62-ADA-d; Ojibwa+ Anissinapek	62-ADA-dg; Ojibwa-Southwestern		Ojibwe	Southwestern Ojibwe (Anishinaabemowin)		ojib1240 Ojibwa-Potawatomi	ojib1241 Ojibwa	nucl1723 Nuclear Ojibwa (cont'd)	cent2252 Central-Eastern- Southwestern; Ojibwa (cont'd)	chip1241 Chippewa	uppe1274 Upper Michigan-Wisconsin Chippewa
Ojibwe	Southwestern Ojibwe		oji Ojibwa (cont'd)	ciw Chippewa	Central Minnesota Chippewa	62-ADA-d; Ojibwa+ Anissinapek	62-ADA-dg; Ojibwa-Southwestern		Ojibwe	Southwestern Ojibwe (Anishinaabemowin)		ojib1240 Ojibwa-Potawatomi	ojib1241 Ojibwa	nucl1723 Nuclear Ojibwa (cont'd)	cent2252 Central-Eastern- Southwestern; Ojibwa (cont'd)	chip1241 Chippewa	cent2135 Central Minnesota Chippewa
Ojibwe	Southwestern Ojibwe		oji Ojibwa (cont'd)	ciw Chippewa	Minnesota Border Chippewa	62-ADA-d; Ojibwa+ Anissinapek	62-ADA-dg; Ojibwa-Southwestern		Ojibwe	Southwestern Ojibwe (Anishinaabemowin)		ojib1240 Ojibwa-Potawatomi	ojib1241 Ojibwa	nucl1723 Nuclear Ojibwa (cont'd)	cent2252 Central-Eastern- Southwestern; Ojibwa (cont'd)	chip1241 Chippewa	minn1250 Minnesota Border Chippewa
Ojibwe	Southwestern Ojibwe		oji Ojibwa (cont'd)	ciw Chippewa	Red Lake Chippewa	62-ADA-d; Ojibwa+ Anissinapek	62-ADA-dg; Ojibwa-Southwestern		Ojibwe	Southwestern Ojibwe (Anishinaabemowin)		ojib1240 Ojibwa-Potawatomi	ojib1241 Ojibwa	nucl1723 Nuclear Ojibwa (cont'd)	cent2252 Central-Eastern- Southwestern; Ojibwa (cont'd)	chip1241 Chippewa	redl1238 Red Lake Chippewa
Ojibwe	Southwestern Ojibwe		oji Ojibwa (cont'd)	ciw Chippewa	Red Lake Chippewa	62-ADA-d; Ojibwa+ Anissinapek	62-ADA-dg; Ojibwa-Southwestern		Ojibwe	Southwestern Ojibwe (Anishinaabemowin)		ojib1240 Ojibwa-Potawatomi	ojib1241 Ojibwa	nucl1723 Nuclear Ojibwa (cont'd)	cent2252 Central-Eastern- Southwestern; Ojibwa (cont'd)	chip1241 Chippewa	turt1236 Turtle Mountain Chippewa
Ojibwe	Saulteaux		oji Ojibwa (cont'd)	ojw Ojibwa, Western		62-ADA-d; Ojibwa+ Anissinapek	62-ADA-dg; Ojibwa-Southwestern		Ojibwe	Saulteaux	Saulteaux	ojib1240 Ojibwa-Potawatomi	ojib1241 Ojibwa	nucl1723 Nuclear Ojibwa (cont'd)	nort3181 Northwestern-Saulteaux Ojibwa	west1510 Western Ojibwa	
Ojibwe	Border Lakes Ojibwe		oji Ojibwa (cont'd)	ojb Ojibwa, Northwestern	Rainy River Ojibwa	62-ADA-d; Ojibwa+ Anissinapek	62-ADA-df; Ojibwa-Southern		Ojibwe	Saulteaux	Saulteaux	ojib1240 Ojibwa-Potawatomi	ojib1241 Ojibwa	nucl1723 Nuclear Ojibwa (cont'd)	nort3181 Northwestern-Saulteaux Ojibwa	nort2961 Northwestern Ojibwa	rain1239 Rainy River Ojibwa
Ojibwe	Northwestern Ojibwe		oji Ojibwa (cont'd)	ojb Ojibwa, Northwestern	Lake of the Woods Ojibwa	62-ADA-d; Ojibwa+ Anissinapek	62-ADA-df; Ojibwa-Southern		Ojibwe	Saulteaux	Saulteaux	ojib1240 Ojibwa-Potawatomi	ojib1241 Ojibwa	nucl1723 Nuclear Ojibwa (cont'd)	nort3181 Northwestern-Saulteaux Ojibwa	nort2961 Northwestern Ojibwa	lake1257 Lake of the Woods Ojibwa
Ojibwe	Northwestern Ojibwe		oji Ojibwa (cont'd)	ojb Ojibwa, Northwestern	Lac Seul Ojibwa	62-ADA-d; Ojibwa+ Anissinapek	62-ADA-df; Ojibwa-Southern		Ojibwe	Saulteaux	Northern Ojibwe	ojib1240 Ojibwa-Potawatomi	ojib1241 Ojibwa	nucl1723 Nuclear Ojibwa (cont'd)	nort3181 Northwestern-Saulteaux Ojibwa	nort2961 Northwestern Ojibwa	lacs1238 Lac Seul Ojibwa
Ojibwe	Northwestern Ojibwe		oji Ojibwa (cont'd)	ojb Ojibwa, Northwestern	Albany River Ojibwa	62-ADA-d; Ojibwa+ Anissinapek	62-ADA-df; Ojibwa-Southern		Ojibwe	Saulteaux	Northern Ojibwe	ojib1240 Ojibwa-Potawatomi	ojib1241 Ojibwa	nucl1723 Nuclear Ojibwa (cont'd)	nort3181 Northwestern-Saulteaux Ojibwa	nort2961 Northwestern Ojibwa	alba1270 Albany River Ojibwa
Ojibwe	Berens River Ojibwe		oji Ojibwa (cont'd)	ojb Ojibwa, Northwestern	Berens River Ojibwa	62-ADA-d; Ojibwa+ Anissinapek	62-ADA-df; Ojibwa-Southern		Ojibwe	Saulteaux	Northern Ojibwe	ojib1240 Ojibwa-Potawatomi	ojib1241 Ojibwa	nucl1723 Nuclear Ojibwa (cont'd)	nort3181 Northwestern-Saulteaux Ojibwa	nort2961 Northwestern Ojibwa	bere1251 Berens River Ojibwa

=== In regionally specific dictionaries ===
This article and related articles			Ethnologue			Eastern Ojibwa-Chippewa-Ottawa Dictionary Ojibwe People's Dictionary Anishinaabe-Ikidowinan Dictionary		
Ojibwe	Eastern Ojibwe		oji Ojibwa	ojg Ojibwa, Eastern		[unmarked] Southern Ojibwa	Oj: Eastern Ojibwa	R: Rama
Ojibwe	Eastern Ojibwe		oji Ojibwa	ojg Ojibwa, Eastern		[unmarked] Southern Ojibwa	Oj: Eastern Ojibwa	CL: Curve Lake
Ojibwe	Eastern Ojibwe		oji Ojibwa	ojg Ojibwa, Eastern		[unmarked] Southern Ojibwa	Oj: Eastern Ojibwa	(CI: Christian Island)
Ojibwe	Eastern Ojibwe		oji Ojibwa	ojg Ojibwa, Eastern		[unmarked] Southern Ojibwa	Oj: Eastern Ojibwa	(CT: Chippewa of the Thames)
Ojibwe	Eastern Ojibwe		oji Ojibwa	ojg Ojibwa, Eastern		[unmarked] Southern Ojibwa	Oj: Eastern Ojibwa	CC: Cape Croker
Ojibwe	Ottawa	Chippewa-Ottawa	oji Ojibwa	otw Ottawa		[unmarked] Southern Ojibwa	Ot: Chippewa/Ottawa	W: Walpole Island
Ojibwe	Ottawa	Chippewa-Ottawa	oji Ojibwa	otw Ottawa		[unmarked] Southern Ojibwa	Ot: Chippewa/Ottawa	(KP: Kettle Point)
Ojibwe	Ottawa	Chippewa-Ottawa	oji Ojibwa	otw Ottawa		[unmarked] Southern Ojibwa	Ot: Chippewa/Ottawa	S: Sarnia
Ojibwe	Ottawa	Chippewa-Ottawa	oji Ojibwa	otw Ottawa		[unmarked] Southern Ojibwa	Ot: Chippewa/Ottawa	BC: Bay City
Ojibwe	Ottawa	Chippewa-Ottawa	oji Ojibwa	otw Ottawa		[unmarked] Southern Ojibwa	Ot: Chippewa/Ottawa	CV: Cross Village
Ojibwe	Ottawa	Ottawa-Ottawa	oji Ojibwa	otw Ottawa		[unmarked] Southern Ojibwa	Ot: Chippewa/Ottawa	M: Manitoulin
Ojibwe	Southwestern Ojibwe		oji Ojibwa	ciw Chippewa	Upper Michigan-Wisconsin Chippewa	N/A (Upper Peninsula Michigan)		
Ojibwe	Southwestern Ojibwe		oji Ojibwa	ciw Chippewa	Upper Michigan-Wisconsin Chippewa	N/A (Northeastern Wisconsin)		
Ojibwe	Southwestern Ojibwe		oji Ojibwa	ciw Chippewa	Upper Michigan-Wisconsin Chippewa	RC: Red Cliff		
Ojibwe	Southwestern Ojibwe		oji Ojibwa	ciw Chippewa	Upper Michigan-Wisconsin Chippewa	BR: Bad River		
Ojibwe	Southwestern Ojibwe		oji Ojibwa	ciw Chippewa	Upper Michigan-Wisconsin Chippewa	LCO: Lac Courte Oreilles		
Ojibwe	Southwestern Ojibwe		oji Ojibwa	ciw Chippewa	Upper Michigan-Wisconsin Chippewa	S: South Central Region	SC: St. Croix	
Ojibwe	Southwestern Ojibwe		oji Ojibwa	ciw Chippewa	Upper Michigan-Wisconsin Chippewa	S: South Central Region	ML: Mille Lacs (District 3)	
Ojibwe	Southwestern Ojibwe		oji Ojibwa	ciw Chippewa	Central Minnesota Chippewa	C: North Central Minnesota	ML: Mille Lacs (District 1 & 2)	
Ojibwe	Southwestern Ojibwe		oji Ojibwa	ciw Chippewa	Central Minnesota Chippewa	C: North Central Minnesota	WE: White Earth (Central & South)	
Ojibwe	Southwestern Ojibwe		oji Ojibwa	ciw Chippewa	Central Minnesota Chippewa	C: North Central Minnesota	FL: Fond du Lac	
Ojibwe	Southwestern Ojibwe		oji Ojibwa	ciw Chippewa	Central Minnesota Chippewa	C: North Central Minnesota	LL: Leech Lake (Central & South)	
Ojibwe	Southwestern Ojibwe		oji Ojibwa	ciw Chippewa	Minnesota Border Chippewa	N: Northern Minnesota	LL: Leech Lake (North)	
Ojibwe	Southwestern Ojibwe		oji Ojibwa	ciw Chippewa	Minnesota Border Chippewa	N: Northern Minnesota	BF: Bois Forte	
Ojibwe	Southwestern Ojibwe		oji Ojibwa	ciw Chippewa	Minnesota Border Chippewa	N: Northern Minnesota	N/A (Grand Portage)	
Ojibwe	Southwestern Ojibwe		oji Ojibwa	ciw Chippewa	Red Lake Chippewa	N: Northern Minnesota	RL: Red Lake (Ponemah)	
Ojibwe	Southwestern Ojibwe		oji Ojibwa	ciw Chippewa	Red Lake Chippewa	N: Northern Minnesota	N/A (White Earth (North))	
Ojibwe	Southwestern Ojibwe		oji Ojibwa	ciw Chippewa	Red Lake Chippewa	N: Northern Minnesota	N/A (Turtle Mountain)	
Ojibwe	Border Lakes Ojibwe		oji Ojibwa	ojb Ojibwa, Northwestern	Rainy River Ojibwa	N: Northern Minnesota	BL: Eastern Canadian Border Lakes	LLC: Lac La Croix
Ojibwe	Border Lakes Ojibwe		oji Ojibwa	ojb Ojibwa, Northwestern	Rainy River Ojibwa	N: Northern Minnesota	BL: Eastern Canadian Border Lakes	NI: Nigigoonsiminikaaning
Ojibwe	Northwestern Ojibwe		oji Ojibwa	ojb Ojibwa, Northwestern	Lake of the Woods Ojibwa	N: Northern Minnesota	N/A (Western Canadian Border Lakes)	
Ojibwe	Northwestern Ojibwe		oji Ojibwa	ojb Ojibwa, Northwestern	Lac Seul Ojibwa	[unmarked] Northwestern Ojibwe	[English River]	LS: Lac Seul
Ojibwe	Northwestern Ojibwe		oji Ojibwa	ojb Ojibwa, Northwestern	Lac Seul Ojibwa	[unmarked] Northwestern Ojibwe	[English River]	Frenchman's Head
Ojibwe	Northwestern Ojibwe		oji Ojibwa	ojb Ojibwa, Northwestern	Albany River Ojibwa	[unmarked] Northwestern Ojibwe	[Albany River]	CL: Cat Lake
Ojibwe	Northwestern Ojibwe		oji Ojibwa	ojb Ojibwa, Northwestern	Albany River Ojibwa	[unmarked] Northwestern Ojibwe	[Albany River]	Os: Osnaburgh (Mishkeegogamang)
Ojibwe	Northwestern Ojibwe		oji Ojibwa	ojb Ojibwa, Northwestern	Albany River Ojibwa	[unmarked] Northwestern Ojibwe	[Albany River]	Slate Falls
Ojibwe	Berens River Ojibwe		oji Ojibwa	ojb Ojibwa, Northwestern	Berens River Ojibwa	[unmarked] Northwestern Ojibwe	[Berens River]	Pi: Pikangikum
Ojibwe	Berens River Ojibwe		oji Ojibwa	ojb Ojibwa, Northwestern	Berens River Ojibwa	[unmarked] Northwestern Ojibwe	[Berens River]	Poplar Hill

== See also ==
- Ojibwe language
  - Ojibwe phonology
  - Ojibwe grammar
  - Ojibwe writing systems
