= Lake Kaunewinne =

Lake in the state of Wisconsin, United States

- Kau-ne-win-ne (Chippewa)
- Location within the United States Location within Wisconsin
- Location: Wood County, Wisconsin, United States
- Coordinates: 44°31′04″N 90°08′28″W
- Surface area: 5 acres (2.0 ha)
- Max. depth: 7 ft (2.1 m)
- Surface elevation: 1,079 ft (329 m)

Lake Kaunewinne is a reservoir in the U.S. state of Wisconsin. The lake has a surface area of 5 acres (2.0 ha) and reaches a depth of 7 feet (2.1 m).

"Kau-ne-win-ne" is a name derived from the Chippewa language meaning "Yellow River".
