= Central Ojibwa language =

Algonquian language spoken in Ontario

Central Ojibwa
- Native to: Canada
- Region: Ontario
- Native speakers: 8,000 (2007)
- Language family: Algic: Algonquian; Ojibwe–Potawatomi; Ojibwe; Nuclear Ojibwe; Central–Eastern–Southwestern Ojibwe; Central–Southwestern Ojibwe?; Central Ojibwa

Language codes
- ISO 639-3: ojc
- Glottolog: cent2136
- Central Ojibwe is classified as Definitely Endangered by the UNESCO Atlas of the World's Languages in Danger.

- Person: Ojibwe ᐅᒋᐺ; Anishinaabe ᐊᓂᔑᓈᐯ
- People: Ojibweg ᐅᒋᐺᒃ / ᐅᒋᐺᐠ; Anishinaabek ᐊᓂᔑᓈᐯᒃ / ᐊᓂᔑᓈᐯᐠ
- Language: Ojibwemowin ᐅᒋᐺᒧᐎᓐ; Anishinaabemowin ᐊᓂᐦᔑᓈᐯᒧᐎᓐ; Hand Talk
- Country: Ojibwewaki ᐅᒋᐻᐘᑭ; Anishinaabewaki ᐊᓂᔑᓈᐯᐘᑭ

Central Ojibwa (also known as Central Ojibwe, Ojibway, Ojibwe) is an Algonquian language spoken in Ontario, Canada from Lake Nipigon in the west to Lake Nipissing in the east.

== Phonology ==
=== Vowels ===
Central Ojibwa has three vowel qualities, /i a o/, that are also distinguished by length and nasalization. There is an additional quality, /eː/, which only occurs long.

=== Consonants ===
		Labial	Alveolar	Palatal	Velar		Glottal	
		Labial	Alveolar	Palatal	plain	labial	plain	labial
Fortis obstruent	plosive	pː ~ ʰp	tː ~ ʰt		kː ~ ʰk	kʷː ~ ʰkʷ	ʔ	ʔʷ
Fortis obstruent	sibilant		sː	ʃː				
Fortis obstruent	affricate			tʃː ~ ʰtʃ				
Lenis obstruent	plosive	p	t		k	kʷ		
Lenis obstruent	sibilant		s	ʃ				
Lenis obstruent	affricate			tʃ				
Approximant				j		w		
Nasal		m	n		ŋ			

== See also ==
- Ojibwe dialects
