= Lake Manakiki =

Lake in the state of Wisconsin, United States

- Ma-na-ki-ki (Chippewa)
- Location within Wisconsin Location within the United States
- Location: Wood County, Wisconsin
- Coordinates: 44°30′49″N 90°08′20″W
- Type: Drainage Lake
- Basin countries: United States
- Surface area: 11 acres (4.5 ha)
- Max. depth: 6 ft (1.8 m)
- Surface elevation: 1,076 ft (328 m)
- Settlements: Pittsville

Lake Manakiki is a reservoir in the U.S. state of Wisconsin. The lake has a surface area of 11 acres (4.5 ha) and reaches a depth of 6 feet (1.8 m). Panfish can be found here.

"Ma-na-ki-ki" is a name derived from the Chippewa language meaning "maple forest".
