= Nipissing Ojibwe dialect =

Dialect of Ojibwe spoken in Ontario, Canada

The Nipissing dialect of Ojibwe is spoken in the area of Lake Nipissing in Ontario. Representative communities in the Nipissing dialect area are Golden Lake, although the language is moribund at that location, and Maniwaki, Quebec. Although speakers of Ojibwe in the community of Kitigan Zibi (also called River Desert) at Maniwaki, Québec self-identify as Algonquin, the language spoken there is Nipissing. Maniwaki speakers were among those who migrated from Oka, Quebec. Similarly, the nineteenth-century missionary Grammaire de la language algonquine ('Grammar of the Algonquin language') describes Nipissing speech.

The term odishkwaagamii 'those at the end of the lake' is attributed to Algonquin speakers as a term for Nipissing dialect speakers, with related Odishkwaagamiimowin 'Nipissing language', and is also cited for Southwestern Ojibwe with the meaning 'Algonquin Indian'; other sources ranging from the seventeenth to nineteenth centuries cite the same form from several different Ojibwe dialects, including Ottawa.

Speakers of this dialect generally use a French-based writing system.

Nipissing Ojibwe is not included in Ethnologue.

== See also ==
- Nipissing First Nation
- Nipissing 10, Ontario
- Golden Lake
