= Broken Oghibbeway =

Pidgin language

- Region: Wisconsin, Mississippi valley
- Native speakers: None
- Language family: Ojibwe-based pidgin

Language codes
- ISO 639-3: None (mis)
- Glottolog: brok1252

During the fur trade era, a pidgin form of Ojibwe known as Broken Oghibbeway was used as a trade language in the Wisconsin and Mississippi River valleys. Data on the language was collected during the 1820s at Prairie du Chien, Wisconsin, by Edwin James, a physician and naturalist, who also gave the pidgin its name. It has been described as "…a language with a restricted vocabulary drawn from the Ottawa dialect of Ojibwe with a few words from the Fox language, another Algonquian language of the region, and restructured and reduced, but not absent, Ojibwe morphology."

James recognized that Broken Oghibbeway was different from the variety of Ojibwe spoken in Wisconsin Territory. He noted that it "…is of the dialect used by the traders and the people of mixed blood in speaking with the Menomonies and Winnebagoes also many of the Sioux, Sauks and Foxes."

== Morphology ==
Although Broken Oghibbeway retains many aspects of the complex inflectional morphology that characterizes Ojibwe, it is nonetheless simplified and restructured, with reductions in the treatment of transitivity and gender, with simplification of the system of personal prefixes used on verbs, loss of the negative suffix that occurs on verbs, and loss of inflectional suffixes that indicate grammatical objects.

For example, in Ojibwe, the inverse marker is suffixed to the animate stem of the verb to express the present tense and a prefix is added to indicate the object of the sentence.

Ni-gos-ig
1SG-fear-INV.3SG.SUB
'He fears me.'

However, in Broken Oghibbeway, the inanimate verb stem is used and the object of a sentence is expressed with an independent pronoun.

O-kot-aan niin
3SG.AN-fear-3.INAN 1SG
'He fears me.'

Animacy distinctions for nouns were completely lost in Broken Oghibbeway, but are somewhat preserved for verbs: animate third person subjects are marked in the verb with the o- prefix, while inanimate subjects have no prefix.
