= Western Ojibwa language =

Ojibwe dialect of Canada

Western Ojibwa
- Nakawēmowin ᓇᐦᑲᐌᒧᐎᓐ
- Native to: Canada
- Region: southern Manitoba, southern Saskatchewan
- Ethnicity: Saulteaux
- Native speakers: 10,000 (2002)
- Language family: Algic: Algonquian; Ojibwe–Potawatomi; Ojibwe; Nuclear Ojibwe; Northwestern–Saulteaux Ojibwa; Western Ojibwa

Language codes
- ISO 639-3: ojw
- Glottolog: west1510
- ELP: Saulteaux
- Saulteau is classified as Vulnerable by the UNESCO Atlas of the World's Languages in Danger.

- Person: Nakawē ᓇᐦᑲᐍ; Ojibwe ᐅᒋᐺ; Anihšināpē ᐊᓂᔑᓈᐯ
- People: Nakawēk ᓇᐦᑲᐍ; Ojibweg ᐅᒋᐺᒃ / ᐅᒋᐺᐠ; Anihšināpēk ᐊᓂᔑᓈᐯᐠ
- Language: Nakawēmowin ᓇᐦᑲᐌᒧᐎᓐ; Ojibwemowin ᐅᒋᐺᒧᐎᓐ; Anihšināpēmowin ᐊᓂᐦᔑᓈᐯᒧᐎᓐ; Hand Talk
- Country: Nakawēwaki ᓇᐦᑲᐍᐘᑭ; Ojibwewaki ᐅᒋᐻᐘᑭ; Anihšināpēwaki ᐊᓂᔑᓈᐯᐘᑭ

Western Ojibwa (also known as Nakawēmowin (ᓇᐦᑲᐌᒧᐎᓐ), Saulteaux, and Plains Ojibwa) is a dialect of the Ojibwe language, a member of the Algonquian language family. It is spoken by the Saulteaux, a subnation of the Ojibwe people, in southern Manitoba and southern Saskatchewan, Canada, west of Lake Winnipeg. Saulteaux is generally used by its speakers, and Nakawēmowin is the general term in the language itself.

== Classification ==
Genetically, Ojibwa is part of the Algonquian language family. This language family includes languages like Mi'kmaq, Abenaki, Malecite, Potawatomi, Delaware, Montagnais-Naskapi, Cree, and Blackfoot in Canada. Menomini, Fox, Shawnee and Cheyenne are spoken in the United States. Yurok and Wiyot, also known as the Ritwan languages in old literature, that were once spoken in California are also relatives with Algonquian language family. Despite the geographic distance, these two languages make part of the Algic language family with the Algonquian languages.

Randolph Valentine (2000) divides Ojibwa into two major dialect groups: a southern group and a northern group. The southern dialect group includes Saulteaux in southern Manitoba and southern Saskatchewan; Ojibwa in most of Ontario, Manitoulin Island and Georgian Bay; Ottawa or Odawa in southern Ontario; and finally Chippewa in North Dakota, Minnesota, Wisconsin, and Michigan. The northern dialect group includes Oji-Cree in northern Ontario and Algonquin in Western Quebec.

Leonard Bloomfield (1946) was able to reconstruct the phonology system and some of the morphology of Proto-Algonquian through the comparison of cognates from four languages: Fox, Cree, Menomini, and Ojibwa.

Proto-Algonquian Reconstructions made by Bloomfield (1946)
Language	'he walks along'	'he fears it'	'he narrates'
Proto-Algonquian	*pemohθeewa	*koqtamwa	*aacimowa
Fox	pemoseewa	kohtamwa	aacimowa
Cree	pimohteew	kostam	aacimow
Menomini	pemoohnɛw	koqtam	aacemow
Ojibwa	pimossee	kottank	aacimo

Comparison of Central Ojibwa (Odawa), Western Ojibwa (Saulteaux), and Swampy Cree (2002)
Language	'Mary's older brother is sleeping'
Central Ojibwa/Odawa	Nbaawan Maaniinh wsayenyan
Western Ojibwa/Saulteaux	Nibaawan Maanii osayenzan
Swampy Cree	Nipâniwa Mânî ostesa

== History ==
In comparison to other eastern tribes, the Ojibwa have suffered the least population loss at the time of European contact. With the number of their peoples and early acquisition of rifles, the Ojibwa were a powerful political force during the early period of the fur trade.

It was common for small groups to go onto the Plains to exploit the hunt and then return to the Woodland area. They would hunt moose, elk, and other forest game. As a result, they gradually advanced north and west from their Red River base, following the forest edge. The bison hunt also became incorporated into the cycle of seasonal exploitation for many of the Ojibwa family groups.

The small groups of Plains Ojibwa are called the Saulteaux. This name derives from French and refers to those that gathered around the falls – specifically the Sault Ste. Marie area of modern Ontario and Michigan. They defeated the Cheyenne in the 1700s and occupied southern Manitoba and southern Saskatchewan when the fur trade died out. They were entrenched as a plains Indian group with the signing of the Number Treaties in the 1870s.

Neither Western Ojibwa or any dialect of Ojibwa has official status in North America.

== Geographic distribution ==
The Ojibwa-speaking regions are found mainly to the south of Cree-speaking regions in Canada.

The exact number of current Saulteaux dialect speakers is unknown. However, there are several Saulteaux communities found in southern Manitoba and southern Saskatchewan.

== Phonology ==
Saulteaux has twenty-four phonemic segments – seventeen consonants and seven vowels.

=== Consonants ===
The consonants are four resonants and thirteen obstruents. The resonant nasals are labial /m/ and alveolar /n/. The resonant glides are labio-velar /w/ and palatal /j/. Western Ojibwa has the glottal stop /ʔ/, not /h/.

Western Ojibwa Consonants
		Labial	Alveolar	Palatal	Velar	Glottal
Plosive/Affricate	Fortis	pː ⟨hp⟩	tː ⟨ht⟩	t͡ʃː ⟨hč⟩	kː ⟨hk⟩	ʔ ⟨h⟩
Plosive/Affricate	Lenis	p~b ⟨p⟩	t~d ⟨t⟩	t͡ʃ~d͡ʒ ⟨č⟩	k~g ⟨k⟩	
Fricative	Fortis		sː ⟨hs⟩	ʃː ⟨hš⟩		
Fricative	Lenis		s~z ⟨s⟩	ʃ~ʒ ⟨š⟩		
Nasal		m ⟨m⟩	n ⟨n⟩		(ŋ ⟨n⟩) (Note: allophone of /n/ before /k/)	
Glide		w ⟨w⟩		j ⟨y⟩		

According to Logan (2001), lenis consonants are voiced between vowels (i.e., V_V) and between nasals and vowels (i.e., N_V). Fortis consonants are sometimes either preaspirated, preglottalized, or extended.

=== Vowels ===
The vowels are divided into three short vowels and four long vowels.

Western Ojibwa Vowels
	Front		Back	
	Short	Long	Short	Long
High	ɪ ⟨i⟩	iː ⟨î⟩	ʊ ⟨o⟩	oː ⟨ô⟩
Low		eː ⟨ê⟩	ʌ ⟨a⟩	aː ⟨â⟩

Western Ojibwa is non-syncopating which means that weak vowels are not deleted according to metrical position.

Short vowels are treated different in the Ojibwa dialects. In Saulteaux, tensing does not occur with initial short vowels. They also do not shift to /a/.

Nasal vowels are becoming denasalized; however, vowels may be nasalized before a nasal followed by a sibilant, i.e. in the phonotactically permissible sequences /ns/, /nz/, and /nzh/.

After a long vowel and before s or ʃ, /n/ is not pronounced the same as elsewhere, instead the preceding vowel is given a nasalized sound.

=== Other phonological properties of Western Ojibwa ===
Valentine (1994) found the following phonological properties of Western Ojibwa:

- t-Epenthesis: a /t/ is inserted between the personal prefix and the vowel when a stem is vowel-initial. This is marked by (t) in texts. For example, ni(t)-anohkî 'I work'.
- y-Epenthesis: a /y/ can be inserted between two long vowels to maintain the phonotactic constraint that vowels do not occur next to each other in Saulteaux. When reduplication occurs on a vowel-initial root a /y/ is inserted. This is marked by (y) in texts. Preroots ending in vowels that come before vowel-initial roots also receive this epenthesis. For example, ni-kî(y)-ayâmin 'we had it, we were there' and a(y)-api '(s)he sits for a long time'.
- Glide elision: If a word that ends with a /w/ has no suffixation, then the /w/ will be elided. The glides (w, y) are optionally elided in many cases, especially in casual speech. The negative particle kâwin usually occurs without the /w/ in casual speech.
- Nasal assimilation: The nasals will assimilate to the following consonant of a cluster. So:
  - /n/ → [m] / __p : /n/ is realized as labial nasal [m] when it occurs before a labial stop /p/
  - /n/ → [ŋ] / __k : /n/ is realized as velar nasal [ŋ] when it occurs before a velar stop /k/.
  - (nk, ng) → [ŋ] / __# : /n/ is realized as [ŋ] when it occurs at the end of the word.
- /ng/ simplified to the velar nasal [ŋ]: this is scattered among the Saulteaux communities – in general it is a southern phenomenon and most prevalent in the southeast.
- ʃ > s: limited to Saulteaux, where the palatal and dental fricatives are common in some communities. This is not just a process of one sound assimilating to the other but both are heard. The occurrence of sibilants on the prairies is possibly coming from Plains Cree, which has only /s/.
- s > ʃ: this feature is restricted to Saulteaux, probably under the influence of Plains Cree which has no /ʃ/.
- /wa/ may be /o/ initially: this occurs in many Saulteaux communities; for example, the word for 'muskrat' may be variably represented as wazhashk or ozhashk.
- Quality of /aa/ is not realized with rounding like in some dialects.
- iwa-stems do not restructure to [ii].
- In some dialects, wiiwi > oo which is [u:] where /ii/ assimilates with the roundness of the w, and the resulting string is simplified to [u:]. This does not happen in Western Ojibwa.
- The quality of /oo/ in waabooz, 'rabbit' is [o].
- Nasal cluster simplification does not happen in this dialect.

== Morphology ==
Typologically, Saulteaux is an agglutinating or polysynthetic language which means that it relies heavily on affixation to express meaning. As is the case with languages that have active morphology, word order in this language is not as rigid as English.

=== Gender and animacy ===
There is no distinction between masculine and feminine – instead there is a distinction between items that are animate and those that are inanimate. The animate category includes all human beings and animals. Some items that are neither human nor animal are still considered animate—e.g., rock, pipe, raspberries, pants. Even across different Saulteaux dialects, 'strawberry' fluctuates in its animacy. This may be related to the practice of a "Strawberry Dance" by certain communities. The gender of an entity is important because for many morphemes, the language uses gender-specific morphology that distinguishes the animate from the inanimate.

Animacy vs. inanimacy
Animate	Inanimate
inini 'man'	cîmân 'boat'
sakimê 'mosquito'	wâwan 'egg'
asikan 'sock'	masinahikan 'book'
miskomin 'raspberry'	otêhimin 'strawberry'

=== Obviation ===
This is a topic strategy for showing prominence between third persons within a discourse environment. Within a predication one animate third person will be the proximate and any other animate third persons will be obligatorily designated as the obviative.

The suffix –an is the obviative marker:

Animohš-∅ owâpamân pôsîns-an.
dog-PROX sees cat-OBV
The dog sees a cat.

Animohš-an owâpamân pôsîns-∅.
dog-OBV sees cat-PROX
The cat sees a dog.

Ojibwa verbs also mark whether the action is direct or inverse. In the first two examples the action takes place directly, where the proximate is acting upon the obviative. This direction can be inverted, meaning that the verb marks when the obviative is acting on the proximate by using the inverse morpheme –ikô-:

Animohš-∅ owâpamikôn pôsîns-an
dog-PROX see.INV cat-OBV
The dog is seen by a cat.

So the –an morpheme is something entirely different from an accusative marker.

=== Person hierarchy ===
There is also a person hierarchy, as a result, showing the "preferred" person to use in Saulteaux discourse is the second person, followed by the first person, and finally the third person. The third person can show the proximate (the unmarked category), the obviative, the highly marked further obviative that is reserved for non-prominent third persons acting or being acted upon by the obviative.

=== Other morphological properties of Western Ojibwa ===
Valentine (1994) found the following morphological properties for Western Ojibwa:

- The suffix –ing is used as a locative
- -(n)s: most Ojibwa dialects form the diminutive by adding the suffix –Vns where V, the vowel, is realized as /e/ unless attached to a noun stem ending with a glide. When there is a glide, like j or w, the suffix takes on the backness and rounding features of the glide. For example, jiimaanens, 'small boat' (stem jiimaan), mitigoons, 'small tree' (mitigw), asabiins 'small net' (stem asaby).
- Saulteaux Ojibwa does not have a suffix for inanimate obviative
- Inanimate plural suffix is realized as –an
- There are a number of Saulteaux communities that use the suffix –an while others use the suffix –anini for obviative possessor of animate
- For animate obviative plural, many communities do not distinguish between singular and plural in the animate obviative.
- There is no final –ii in nouns with a Cy stem
- The demonstrative for animate singular proximal waha(we) is used. The reduced form awe is much more common.
- First person plural exclusive 'we' is niinawi(n)d
- Indefinite animate singular 'someone' is awi(i)ya. However, the Saulteaux speakers may say it in a plural context: either awiiyag (which is the plural form) or awiya.
- Gegoo is indefinite inanimate singular 'something'.
- Awenen is the animate singular interrogative pronoun 'who' used by the Manitoba Saulteaux speakers while awanen is used by the extreme west of Saulteaux.
- Aanapii is the interrogative particle 'when'.
- Aa(n)di is the interrogative particle 'where'.
- Aaniin is the interrogative particle 'how'.
- Ninoonde- seems to be outstripping niwii- as the voluntative preverb within the Saulteaux communities, especially speakers surveyed west of central Manitoba.
- A number of western Saulteaux communities use onji- as a negative past preverb. This is found common in areas adjacent to or bilingual with Cree, which uses the cognate ohci-.
- Northern Manitoba Saulteaux have e-gii- as a complementizer preverb while communities in the south have gii-.

== Syntax ==
Saulteaux is a non-configurational language which means that it has free word order. A fully inflected verb constitutes a sentence or clause on its own with the subject, object, aspect and other notions expressed through the verbal morphology. The language dialect uses pronominals to express the arguments of the verb and any overt nouns (or determiner phrases (DPs)) that further refer to these entities are just adjuncts of the verb. The overt DPs are actually not necessary as they just repeat information and relationships already marked on the verb. As a result, the occurrence of DPs referring to the arguments of verbs is optional and often left out.

Joe-∅ o-minwênim-â-n Mary-an.
Joe-OBV 3.OBV-like-DIR-3.SG.PROX Mary-PROX
Joe likes Mary.

The thematic information is applied verb-internally and not at the sentence level and so the affixes and clitics are arguments. The verb ominwênimân by itself already shows that someone likes another person. The verb is from the third person set of the VTA (transitive animate verb) order and is inflected for a direct action. We can see that the proximate is acting on the obviative as Joe is not marked and Mary is marked with the obviative marker –an.

Saulteaux's word order, however, would be better described as VO(S) to show the rare appearance of an overt subject, but that it does occur finally most often when it does appear.

== Writing system ==
The language is written using the Standard Roman Orthography (SRO). Some people use double vowels to represent long vowels while others lengthen the vowels by adding either a circumflex accent (⟨^⟩) (⟨â, ê, î, ô, û⟩) or acute accent (⟨´⟩) (⟨á, é, í, ó, ú⟩).

== Common phrases ==
Common phrases in Western Ojibwa
Western Ojibwa	English
Aaniin, boozhoo!	Hello: How are you?
Nimino-ayaa	I am fine
Mino-giizhigad/ Mino-giizhigan	It's a nice day
Gizhaaganaashiim ina?	Do you speak English?
Gaawiin	No, none, negative
Miinange	Yes, definitely
Eya'	Yes, yeah
Enange	Of course, I agree
Amanj, namanj	'I don't know'
Miigwech	Thank you
Ambe	Come
Aaniin ezhinikaazoyin?	What is your name?
_________ ndizhinikaaz	My name is _________
Giin dash?	And you?

== Notable researchers ==
Some notable researchers who documented the Ojibwa dialect are:

- Margaret Cote-Lerat
- Terry J. Klokeid
- Harold J. Logan
- James H. Howard
- Paul Voorhis
- J. Randolph Valentine

== See also ==
- Algonquian languages
- Ojibwe language
- Ojibwe dialects
