= North of Superior Ojibwe dialect =

Ojibwe dialect in Canada

North of Superior Ojibwe
- Anishinaabemowin
- Region: Ontario, Canada (North shore of Lake Superior)
- Ethnicity: Ojibwe
- Language family: Algic: Algonquian; Central Algonquian; Ojibwe; North of Superior Ojibwe

Language codes
- ISO 639-3: ojc
- Glottolog: cent2136 Central Ojibwa

North of Superior is a dialect of the Ojibwe language spoken on the north shore of Lake Superior in the area east of Lake Nipigon to Sault Ste Marie, Ontario. Communities include (east to west) Pic Mobert, Pic Heron, Pays Plat, Long Lac, Aroland, Rocky Bay, and Lake Helen, all in Ontario.

== Dialect features ==
The distinctiveness of North of Superior is reflected in a small number of "grammatical features and substantial lexical features." North of Superior is in the southern group of Ojibwe dialects, but also contains a mixture of Ojibwe northern dialect features. Communities such as Aroland and Long Lac that are in the northern part of the dialect area show more features found in northern dialects.

North of Superior Ojibwe is not included in Ethnologue.

== See also ==
- Ojibwe language
