= Border Lakes Ojibwe dialect =

Ojibwe dialect spoken in Ontario, Canada

Border Lakes Ojibwe is a dialect of the Ojibwe language spoken in the Lake of the Woods area of Ontario at the intersection of the borders of Ontario, Minnesota, and Manitoba. Communities in the Border Lakes dialect area have sometimes been treated as a part of the Western Ojibwe (Saulteaux) dialect, but dialect survey research conducted in the 1980s and 1990s analyses it as a separate dialect closely related to Saulteaux Ojibwe.

Communities identified as Border Lakes include Lac La Croix, Emo (Rainy River First Nation), and Whitefish Bay, all in Ontario.

Border Lakes Ojibwe is not listed in Ethnologue.
