= Eastern Ojibwa language =

Ojibwe language of Canada

Eastern Ojibwa
- Native to: Canada
- Region: Ontario
- Native speakers: (26,000 cited 1998 census) (appears to be double counted with other varieties)
- Language family: Algic: Algonquian; Ojibwe-Potawatomi; Ojibwe; Nuclear Ojibwe; Central-Eastern-Southwestern Ojibwa; Eastern Ojibwa

Language codes
- ISO 639-3: ojg
- Glottolog: east2542
- ELP: Eastern Ojibwe
- Eastern Ojibwe is classified as Severely Endangered by the UNESCO Atlas of the World's Languages in Danger

- Person: Ojibwe; Nishnaabe
- People: Ojibweg; Anishinabek; Nishnaabek
- Language: Ojibwemowin; Nishnaabemwin
- Country: Ojibwewaki; Anishinaabewaki

Eastern Ojibwe (also known as Ojibway, Ojibwa) is a dialect of the Ojibwe language spoken north of Lake Ontario and east of Georgian Bay in Ontario, Canada. Eastern Ojibwe-speaking communities include Rama and Curve Lake. Ojibwe is an Algonquian language.

== See also ==
- Ojibwe dialects
