= Oji-Cree language =

Indigenous name for a dialect of the Ojibwe language

Oji-Cree
- Severn Ojibwa
- Anishininiimowin, ᐊᓂᔑᓂᓂᒧᐏᐣ
- Native to: Canada
- Region: Ontario, Manitoba
- Ethnicity: Oji-Cree
- Native speakers: 13,630 (2016 census)
- Language family: Algic: Algonquian; Ojibwe-Potawatomi; Ojibwe; Severn-Algonquin; Oji-Cree

Language codes
- ISO 639-3: ojs
- Glottolog: seve1240
- ELP: Oji-Cree
- Map of Anishinaabe peoples in 1800

- Oji-Cree is classified as Vulnerable by the UNESCO Atlas of the World's Languages in Danger.

- Person: Anihshininii ᐊᓂᐦᔑᓂᓃ
- People: Anihshininiiwag ᐊᓂᐦᔑᓂᓃᐗᐠ
- Language: Anihshininiimowin ᐊᓂᐦᔑᓂᓃᒧᐏᐣ; Hand Talk

The Severn Ojibwa or the Oji-Cree language (ᐊᓂᐦᔑᓂᓃᒧᐏᐣ, Anishininiimowin; Unpointed: ᐊᓂᔑᓂᓂᒧᐏᐣ) is the indigenous name for a dialect of the Ojibwe language spoken in a series of Oji-Cree communities in northern Ontario and at Island Lake, Manitoba, Canada. Ojibwa is a member of the Algonquian language family, itself a member of the Algic language family.

The language is often referred to in English as Oji-Cree, with the term Severn Ojibwa (or Ojibwe) primarily used by linguists and anthropologists. Severn Ojibwa speakers have also been identified as Northern Ojibwa, and the same term has been applied to their dialect.

Severn Ojibwa speakers use two self-designations in their own language. The first is Anishinini 'ordinary person' (plural Anishininiwag). This term has been compared to Plains Cree ayisiyiniw 'person, human being.' The term Anishinaabe 'ordinary man,' which is widely used as a self-designation across the Ojibwa dialect continuum, is also used and accepted by Severn speakers.

The term Anishininiimowin is the general word used in Severn Ojibwa to refer to the language itself (noun Anishinini 'ordinary person,' suffix -mo 'speak a language,' suffix -win 'nominalizer'). A similar term Anishinaabemowin with the same structure would be expected but has not been documented in published sources.

Anishininiimowin was one of only six aboriginal languages in Canada to report an increase in use in the 2001 Canadian census over the 1996 census.

== Classification ==
Although sometimes described as a separate language, Severn Ojibwa is most accurately described as a dialect of the larger Ojibwe language complex with a number of distinctive innovations in addition to an increment of vocabulary borrowed from Cree and a modest amount of Cree morphology.

Valentine has proposed that Ojibwe dialects are divided into three groups: a northern tier consisting of Severn and Algonquin; a southern tier consisting of "Odawa, Chippewa, Eastern Ojibwe, the Ojibwe of the Border Lakes region between Minnesota and Ontario, and Saulteaux; and third, a transitional zone between these two polar groups, in which there is a mixture of northern and southern features."

It has been noted that, along with Algonquin and Odawa, Severn Ojibwa "...show[s] many distinct features, which suggest periods of relative isolation from other varieties of Ojibwe." However, while each of these dialects has undergone innovations that make each of them distinctive in some respects, their status as part of the Ojibwa language complex is not in dispute. Many communities adjacent to these relatively sharply differentiated dialects show a mix of transitional features, reflecting overlap with other nearby dialects.

== Cree influence ==
Cree has historically had a significant cultural influence on Severn Ojibwa and its speakers. Cree Anglican catechists evangelized Severn Ojibwa speakers in the late nineteenth century. For example, Cree missionary William Dick established an Anglican mission in Severn Ojibwa territory at Big Trout Lake, where he served from the late nineteenth century until the early twentieth century (approximate dates 1887–1917). Although their language is clearly a dialect of Ojibwe, in the late 1970s, it was noted that "The northern bands of Northern Ojibwa prefer to be called Cree, a usage that has confused students and government officials: the Trout Lake, Deer Lake, and Caribou Lake bands of Northern Ojibwa are not distinguished from their Cree-speaking neighbours to the north in Canadian government publications ...".

Referring specifically to grammatical features in Severn Ojibwe, research indicates that "... the amount of Cree influence on Ojibwe grammar actually appears rather small. The common designation of northern Ojibwe linguistic varieties [i.e. as 'Oji-Cree'] is profoundly misleading in terms of the relative grammatical representation of each language in that these varieties are decidedly Ojibwe in structure."

Several different Cree dialects appear to have been sources of Severn Ojibwa vocabulary. For example, a layer of vocabulary items in Severn appears to be of Plains Cree origin, despite the fact that Severn speakers are at a significant distance from Plains Cree speakers. Valentine has suggested that "The logical means by which Plains Cree could exert an influence on Severn Ojibwe is through the Cree Bible, and other liturgical materials, which are used widely and extensively in the Anglican and Roman Catholic churches in the Severn region." The liturgical language of many of these communities is Plains Cree, a separate mutually unintelligible language.

== Sub-dialects ==
A number of core Severn speaking communities have been identified. Dialect research in the 1970s suggested a relatively shallow set of differences that distinguish a core Big Trout Lake subgroup (itself further divided into two minor subgroups), and a Deer Lake area subgroup.

"Nichols 1976 determined that there exist two minor subdialects of Severn Ojibwe, one designated the Big Trout Lake area and the other the Deer Lake area. The Big Trout Lake area is divided into two subgroups, Western, composed of communities situated in the Severn River system, and Eastern, made up mostly of communities in the drainage area of the Winisk River."

(A) Big Trout Area

(i) Western Big Trout (Severn River System)

Bearskin Lake
Big Trout Lake
Muskrat Dam
Sachigo Lake

(ii) Eastern Big Trout (Winisk River System)

Angling Lake
Kasabonika
Kingfisher Lake
Webequie
Wunnumin Lake

(B) Deer Lake Area

Deer Lake
North Spirit Lake
Sandy Lake

The Keewaywin community is a group that recently broke off from the main Sandy Lake community; their dialect is the same as Sandy Lake.

A number of communities around the periphery of the core Severn Ojibwa area share some Severn features, but also share features of other dialects and have been described as transitional communities. These include Round Lake, Lansdowne House, Ogoki Post, Fort Hope, and Summer Beaver.

=== Dialect of Island Lake, Manitoba ===
The Island Lake community in northern Manitoba consists of a series of adjacent settlements: Garden Hill, Red Sucker Lake, St. Theresa Point, and Wasagamack First Nation, referred to collectively as Island Lake.

As with Severn Ojibwa communities in northwestern Ontario, "According to Canadian Government sources (Canada, 1970), the Island Lake people speak "Cree" and they are in no way distinguished from the Cree of Oxford House, Gods Lake, or Norway House."

Island Lake speech has been described by residents and outsiders alike as containing features of Ojibwe and Cree. A dialect study conducted in the early 1970s concluded that "the speech of Island Lake is Ojibwa with an admixture of Cree." Available information indicates as well that Island Lake Ojibwe shares Severn features: "The dialect affiliation of Island Lake Ojibwa is with Severn Ojibwe. Consistent informant responses indicate almost complete intelligibility with Severn Ojibwa on the one hand, and reduced intelligibility with Berens River, Bloodvein, Little Grand Rapids, and Pikangikaum...".

A review of Island Lake family history indicates that approximately 50% of families listed in 1909 documents originated in the Deer Lake-Favourable Lake area and approximately 25% in the Sandy Lake-Big Trout Lake areas of northwestern Ontario. A complex migration history includes the return of a number of these migrants to their original communities with a subsequent migration of some back to Island Lake.

== Phonology ==
=== Consonants ===
	Labial	Alveolar	Post-alv./ Palatal	Velar	Glottal
Plosive	p	t		k	
Affricate			tʃ		
Nasal	m	n			
Fricative		s	ʃ		h
Approximant			j	w	

Stop and affricate sounds /p t k tʃ/ and fricatives /s ʃ/ can have fortis and lenis variants. Preaspiration can often occur among fortis sounds.

=== Vowels ===
	Short		Long
	tense	lax	Long
Close	i	ɪ	iː
Mid-back	o	ʊ	oː
Mid			eː
Open	a	ʌ	aː

The mid-front vowel /eː/ does not have a short counterpart.

== Vocabulary examples ==
Oji-Cree words are shown in both Oji-Cree syllabics and Saulteaux-Cree Roman (with the Hybrid Double Vowel Roman in parentheses). Along with the Oji-Cree words, for comparison, Swampy Cree in Western Syllabics and Salteaux-Cree Roman, and Northwestern Ojibwa in Eastern Ojibwe Syllabics and Saulteaux-Cree Roman (with Fiero Double Vowel Roman in parentheses) are also shown. Translations of the words are also given.

Swampy Cree	Oji-Cree	Northwestern Ojibwa	Translation
ᓂᔅᑭᐲᓯᒼ niski-pīsim	ᓂᐦᑭᐲᐦᓯᒼ nihki-pīhsim (nihki-piisim)	ᓂᐦᑭᑮᓯᐦᔅ nihki-kīsihs (niki-giizis)	April lit. 'Goose-Moon'
ᐃᓂᓂᐤ ininiw	ᐃᓂᓂ inini (inini)	ᐃᓂᓂ inini (inini)	man
ᐃᓂᓂᐘᐠ ininiwak	ᐃᓂᓂᐘᐠ ininiwak (ininiwak)	ᐃᓂᓂᐗᒃ ininiwak (ininiwag)	men
ᒫᐦᑲᐧ māhkwa	ᒫᐦᒃ māhk (maahk)	ᒫᓐᒃ mānk (maang)	loon
ᒫᐦᑲᐧᐠ māhkwak	ᒫᐦᑿᐠ māhkwak (maahkwak)	ᒫᓐᑾᒃ mānkwak (maangwag)	loons
ᒥᓯᑕ misita	ᐅᓯᑕᐣ [Island Lake: ᐅᑎᐦᑕᐣ] ositan [Island Lake: othitan] (ositan [Island Lake: othitan])	ᐅᓯᑕᓐ ositan (ozidan)	feet

== See also ==
- Ojibwe dialects
