= Northwestern Ojibwa =

Ojibwe dialect in Canada

- Native to: Canada
- Region: Ontario, Manitoba
- Native speakers: (20,000 cited 2000)
- Language family: Algic: Algonquian; Ojibwe–Potawatomi; Ojibwe; Nuclear Ojibwe; Northwestern–Saulteaux Ojibwa; Northwestern Ojibwa

Language codes
- ISO 639-3: ojb
- Glottolog: nort2961
- Northwestern Ojibwe is classified as Vulnerable by the UNESCO Atlas of the World's Languages in Danger.

- Person: Ojibwe ᐅᒋᐺ; Anishinaabe ᐊᓂᔑᓈᐯ
- People: Ojibweg ᐅᒋᐺᒃ / ᐅᒋᐺᐠ; Anishinaabek ᐊᓂᔑᓈᐯᒃ / ᐊᓂᔑᓈᐯᐠ
- Language: Ojibwemowin ᐅᒋᐺᒧᐎᓐ; Anishinaabemowin ᐊᓂᐦᔑᓈᐯᒧᐎᓐ; Hand Talk
- Country: Ojibwewaki ᐅᒋᐻᐘᑭ; Anishinaabewaki ᐊᓂᔑᓈᐯᐘᑭ

Northwestern Ojibwe (also known as Northern Ojibwa, Ojibway, Ojibwe) is a dialect of the Ojibwe language, spoken in Ontario and Manitoba, Canada. Ojibwe is a member of the Algonquian language family.

== See also ==
- Ojibwe dialects
