= Chippewa language =

Algonquian language spoken in US Midwest

Chippewa
- Anishinaabemowin, ᐊᓂᐦᔑᓈᐯᒧᐎᓐ
- Pronunciation: [anɪːʃɪnaːpeːmowɪn]
- Native to: United States
- Region: Upper Peninsula of Michigan, Wisconsin, Minnesota, and North Dakota
- Ethnicity: 104,000 Chippewa (1990 census)
- Native speakers: 6986 (2010 census)
- Language family: Algic: Algonquian; Ojibwe-Potawatomi; Ojibwe; Nuclear Ojibwe; Central-Eastern-Southwestern Ojibwa; Chippewa

Language codes
- ISO 639-3: ciw
- Glottolog: chip1241
- ELP: Southwestern Ojibwa

- Person: Ojibwe ᐅᒋᐺ; Anishinaabe ᐊᓂᔑᓈᐯ
- People: Ojibweg ᐅᒋᐺᒃ / ᐅᒋᐺᐠ; Anishinaabek ᐊᓂᔑᓈᐯᒃ / ᐊᓂᔑᓈᐯᐠ
- Language: Ojibwemowin ᐅᒋᐺᒧᐎᓐ; Anishinaabemowin ᐊᓂᐦᔑᓈᐯᒧᐎᓐ; Hand Talk
- Country: Ojibwewaki ᐅᒋᐻᐘᑭ; Anishinaabewaki ᐊᓂᔑᓈᐯᐘᑭ

Chippewa (native name: Anishinaabemowin; also known as Southwestern Ojibwa/Ojibwe/Ojibway/Ojibwemowin) is an Algonquian language spoken from upper Michigan westward to North Dakota in the United States. It represents the southern component of the Ojibwe language.

Chippewa is part of the Algonquian language family and an indigenous language of North America. Chippewa is part of the dialect continuum of Ojibwe (including Chippewa, Ottawa, Algonquin, and Oji-Cree), which is closely related to Potawatomi. It is spoken on the southern shores of Lake Superior and in the areas toward the south and west of Lake Superior in Michigan and Southern Ontario. The speakers of this language generally call it Anishinaabemowin ('the Anishinaabe language') or more specifically, Ojibwemowin ('the Ojibwa language').

There is a large amount of variation in the language. Some of the variations are caused by ethnic or geographic heritage, while other variations occur from person to person. There is no single standardization of the language as it exists as a dialect continuum, according to Nichols: "It exists as a chain of interconnected local varieties, conventionally called dialects." Some varieties differ greatly and can be so diverse that speakers of two different varieties cannot understand each other.

In the southern range of are where the language is spoken, it is mostly spoken by the older generations of the Anishinaabe people, and many of its speakers also speak English. The language is classified as severely endangered by UNESCO.

== Number of speakers ==
The Chippewa dialects have been the focus of many academic works, from William Whipple Warren and Fr. Frederick Baraga in the 19th century, and Frances Densmore, Jan P. B. de Josselin de Jong, Charles Fiero, Earl Nyholm and John Nichols in the 20th century. However, the Chippewa dialect of Ojibwemowin has continued to steadily decline. Beginning in the 1970s many of the communities have aggressively put their efforts into language revitalization, but have only managed to produce some fairly educated second-language speakers. Today, the majority of the first-language speakers of this dialect of the Ojibwe language are elderly, whose numbers are quickly diminishing, while the number of second-language speakers among the younger generation are growing. However, none of the second-language speakers have yet to transition to the fluency of a first-language speaker.

In the summer of 2009, Anton Treuer of Bemidji State University conducted an informal survey of number of first-language speakers of the Chippewa dialects in Minnesota and Wisconsin in order to convene a language session to address the need of vocabulary associated with math and sciences. Together with other reservations that were not surveyed, Treuer estimates only around 1,000 first-language speakers of the Chippewa dialect in the United States.

Reservation	Number of first-language speakers	Estimated number of second-language speakers	Number of total population
Red Lake	400	2,400	10,570
Mille Lacs	150	1,150	3,942
Leech Lake	90	950	8,861
Bois Forte	20	110	3,052
White Earth	15	650	19,291
Grand Portage	3	90	1,127
Fond du Lac	0	520	4,044
St. Croix	25	80	1,080
Lac Courte Oreilles	10	130	6,146
Lac du Flambeau	3	120	3,457
Bad River	2	100	6,921
Red Cliff	1	50	4,470
Mole Lake	1	20	1,279

== Dialects ==
According to Ethnologue, the Chippewa Language or the Southwestern dialect of the Ojibwe language is divided into four smaller dialects:

- Upper Michigan-Wisconsin Chippewa: on Keweenaw Bay, Lac Vieux Desert, Lac du Flambeau, Red Cliff, Bad River, Lac Courte Oreilles, St. Croix and Mille Lacs (District III).
- Central Minnesota Chippewa: on Mille Lacs (Districts I and II), Fond du Lac, Leech Lake, White Earth and Turtle Mountain.
- Red Lake Chippewa: on Red Lake
- Minnesota Border Chippewa: on Grand Portage and Bois Forte

== Structure ==
=== Syntax ===
Like other varieties of Anishinaabemowin, in Chippewa a great deal of information is already contained in the words, so the sentence order can be quite free, but the primary word order is subject–verb–object. There are three general parts of speech: nouns, verbs, and others. Nouns types are broken down by number and by whether they are animate or inanimate gender. There are four verb types used to show if the verb is transitive, if the subject of the verb is animate or inanimate, if the object of the verb is animate or inanimate, and the plurality of the subject. There is also a verb type that may only be used in the inverse. There are case markings that come at the beginning of words to show what verb type or noun type the word is. Other classes of words include adverbs, numbers, particles, pre-nouns, and pre-verbs. Pre-verbs and pre-nouns are not whole words; however, they are modifying forms that freely combine with nouns, verbs, or adverbs to add meaning. These words come before that which they are describing, and may not be at the beginning of the word if other meanings are added to the word. Hyphens in Chippewa signify the break between a stem and a pre-noun or pre-verb. The language uses postpositions, which are attached to the ends of words and are not separated from the words they govern. For example, the word ashangewigamig means 'welfare office' in Chippewa, but the word ashangewigamigong means 'to the welfare office'. The -ong ending and other similar endings in Chippewa are locatives that corresponds with the English words in, at, on, by. Chippewa also generally uses an adjective-noun order; however, sometimes the two words are modified and combine to form a single word. Many times one word is used to show phrases. Prepositional phrases and some noun phrases are expressed in a single word. Noun-verb combinations are also sometimes expressed in a single word. The Chippewa language has pronouns to show person (first, second, or third), and number (singular or plural). The language also has an inclusive and an exclusive first-person plural pronoun. These pronouns are included in the verb and usually serve at the beginning of the verb along with a relational suffix.

=== Morphology ===
The Chippewa language uses inflection to make new forms of words and also derivation to make new words from parts of others. It uses noun incorporation, which is the inclusion of nouns within verbs and has many affixes attached onto nouns and verbs. For these reasons, Chippewa's basic morphological type is polysynthetic. The language uses compound nouns. There are few simple nouns. The majority of nouns are formed by a composition of stems and affixes. The Chippewa uses prefixes, suffixes and even infixes. To show plurality, suffixes are added onto the ends of words. Prefixes are used to show possession, and are also used to show verb or noun type and also tense. Because of all of the incorporation of meanings into one word, it can be very difficult to pull apart the meanings of some of the phrases used. Since prefixes are used so frequently, the stem of some words may be hidden somewhere in the middle. It might be difficult to find a word in the dictionary for one who has never been exposed to the language.

=== Phonology ===
The Chippewa language has three short vowels (a i o) and four long vowels (aa e ii oo). There are also nasal vowels which consist of a basic vowel followed by nh. The h may be omitted before a y or a glottal stop. Nasalized vowels are vowels before ns, nz, or nzh. Consonants are comparable to their English counterparts and are written: ⟨b ch d g h ' j k l n nh p r s sh t w y z zh⟩. Letters not used in Chippewa are ⟨f l r u v⟩ and ⟨x⟩. The letter ⟨c⟩ is used only in a digraph, and the letter ⟨h⟩ is mostly used in digraphs, but on very rare occasions, usually in exclamations, occurs independently. Letters ⟨l⟩, ⟨f⟩, and ⟨r⟩ only occur in words loaned from other languages. There are certain consonant clusters that occur in Chippewa: sk, shp, sht, shk, mb, nd, nj, ng. A consonant cluster also may occur with a single consonant followed by a w before a vowel. Most letters are pronounced similarly to how they are pronounced in English. Letters b, d, and g are often devoiced when placed near voiceless consonants or at the beginning of words. Sometimes s, t, and ch are pronounced with more force than how pronounced in English and also with a rounding of the lips. The Chippewa language uses voiced and voiceless stops, fricatives, affricates, nasal stops, and approximates. It also uses labial, alveolar, palatal, velar, and glottal consonant places.

== Notes ==
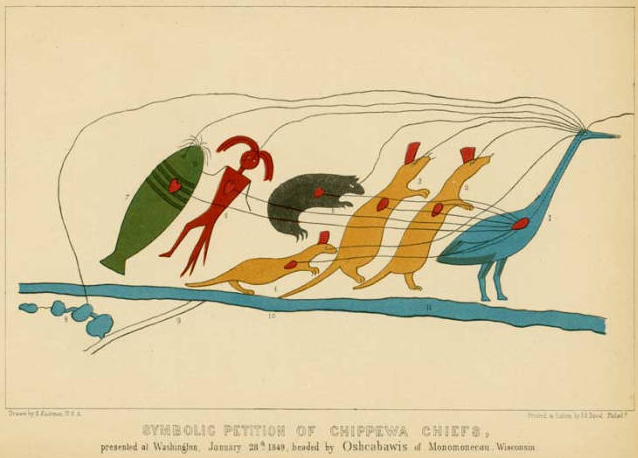
Chief Buffalo's Petition 1849 originally of birch bark

== See also ==
- Ojibwe dialects
