= Euphemia (typeface) =

Humanist sans-serif typeface

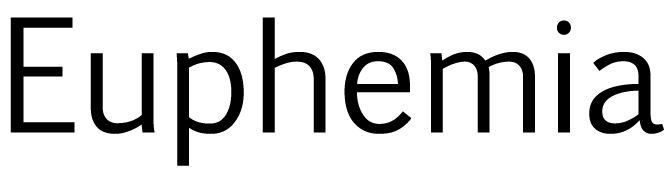
- Category: Sans-Serif
- Designer(s): Ross Mills
- Foundry: Tiro Typeworks
- Date released: 2005

Euphemia (syllabics: ᐅᕓᒥᐊ) is a sans-serif typeface for Unified Canadian Syllabics.

== Usage ==
Various versions of "Euphemia" have been supplied in Windows Server 2008, Windows Vista, Windows 7 and Windows 8. OS X also supplies a version called "Euphemia UCAS".

== Unicode ranges ==
Euphemia has support for the following Unicode ranges:

- Basic Latin
- Latin-1 Supplement
- Latin Extended-A
- Latin Extended-B
- Spacing Modifier Letters
- Combining Diacritical Marks
- General Punctuation
- Currency Symbols
- Letterlike Symbols
- Mathematical Operators
- Supplemental Mathematical Operators
- Miscellaneous Mathematical Symbols-A
- Miscellaneous Mathematical Symbols-B
- Unified Canadian Aboriginal Syllabics
- Unified Canadian Aboriginal Syllabics Extended
- Unified Canadian Aboriginal Syllabics Extended-A
