= Canadian aboriginal =

Canadian aboriginal may refer to:

- Aboriginal peoples in Canada
- Canadian Aboriginal syllabics, a script

== See also ==
- Unified Canadian Aboriginal Syllabics (Unicode block)
