= Equals sign =

Mathematical symbol of equality

=o

Equals sign
- In Unicode: U+003D = EQUALS SIGN (&equals;)

Related
- See also: U+2260 ≠ NOT EQUAL TO; U+2248 ≈ ALMOST EQUAL TO; U+2261 ≡ IDENTICAL TO

A well-known equality featuring the equal sign

The equals sign (British English) or equal sign (American English), also known as the equality sign, is the mathematical symbol =, which is used to indicate equality. In an equation, it is placed between two expressions that have the same value, or for which one studies the conditions under which they have the same value.

In Unicode and ASCII it has the code point U+003D. It was invented in 1557 by the Welsh mathematician Robert Recorde.

== History ==
The first use of an equals sign, equivalent to 14x+15=71 in modern notation. From The Whetstone of Witte (1557) by Robert Recorde.

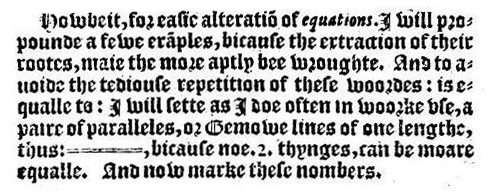
Recorde's introduction of "="

Prior to 16th century there was no common symbol for equality, and equality was usually expressed with a word, such as aequales, aequantur, esgale, faciunt, ghelijck or gleich, and sometimes by the abbreviated form aeq, or simply ⟨æ⟩ and ⟨œ⟩. Diophantus's use of ⟨ἴσ⟩, short for ἴσος (ísos 'equals'), in Arithmetica (c. AD 250) is considered one of the first uses of an equals sign.

The = symbol, now universally accepted in mathematics for equality, was first recorded by the Welsh mathematician Robert Recorde in The Whetstone of Witte (1557), just one year before his death. The original form of the symbol was much wider than the present form. In his book Recorde explains his design of the "Gemowe lines" (meaning twin lines, from the Latin gemellus)

And to auoide the tediouſe repetition of theſe woordes : is equalle to : I will ſette as I doe often in woorke vſe, a paire of paralleles, or Gemowe lines of one lengthe, thus: =, bicauſe noe .2. thynges, can be moare equalle.
And to avoid the tedious repetition of these words: "is equal to" I will set as I do often in work use, a pair of parallels, or duplicate lines of one [the same] length, thus: =, because no 2 things can be more equal.

— Recorde, Robert (1557). The Whetstone of Witte. London: John Kyngstone. the third page of the chapter "The rule of equation, commonly called Algebers Rule."

The symbol = was not immediately popular. After its introduction by Recorde, it was not used again in print until 1618 (61 years later), in an anonymous Appendix in Edward Wright's English translation of Descriptio, by John Napier. It was not until 1631 that it received more than general recognition in England, being adopted as the symbol for equality in three influential works, Thomas Harriot's Artis analyticae praxis, William Oughtred's Clavis mathematicae and Richard Norwood's Trigonometria. The sign was later used by John Wallis, Isaac Barrow and Isaac Newton, which helped it to spread to continental Europe.

=== Competing symbols ===
There were several other competing symbols for equality, especially outside of England around the 16th and 17th centuries, and Recorde's version made no significant influence in the European continent until 1650 or 1660. In 1559 the French monk Johannes Buteo published his Logistica using the symbol$\ [$ for equality. In 1571 Wilhelm Xylander published an edition of Diophantus' Arithmetica in which two parallel vertical lines || were used for equality. (Note: He gives no clue as to the origin of the symbol. Moritz Cantor suggests that perhaps the Greek word ίσοι ("equal") was abbreviated in the manuscript used by Xylander, by the writing of only the two letters ίι.) This version was adopted by several prominent writers, including Giovanni Glorioso, Cardinal Michelangelo Ricci, and many French and Dutch mathematicians in the hundred years after, including René Descartes in 1621.

A major competitor to Recorde's sign was Descartes's own symbol (like a reversed U+221D ∝ PROPORTIONAL TO, from æquare), introduced in his La Géométrie (1637). In fact, Descartes himself used the sign = for equality in a letter in 1640. Descartes does not give any reason for introducing his new symbol; however, Florian Cajori suggests it is because = was also being used for a difference operation at the time. Due to the prominence of La Géométrie, by 1675, Descartes's symbol gained favour over Recorde's in Europe, and most 17th-century writers on the continent either used Descartes's notation for equality or none at all. Around the turn of the 18th century, Recorde's notation gained favour rapidly. The dominating trend in mathematics of the time was differential and integral calculus. The fact that both Newton and Gottfried Wilhelm Leibniz used Recorde's symbol led to its general adoption.

== Usage in mathematics and computer programming ==
In mathematics, the equals sign can be used as a simple statement of fact in a specific case ("x = 2"), or to create definitions ("let x = 2"), conditional statements ("if x = 2, then ..."), or to express a universal equivalence ("(x + 1)^{2} = x^{2} + 2x + 1").

The first important computer programming language to use the equals sign was the original version of Fortran, FORTRAN I, designed in 1954 and implemented in 1957. In Fortran, = serves as an assignment operator: X = 2 sets the value of X to 2. This somewhat resembles the use of = in a mathematical definition, but with different semantics: the expression following = is evaluated first, and may refer to a previous value of X. For example, the assignment X = X + 2 increases the value of X by 2.

A rival programming-language usage was pioneered by the original version of ALGOL, which was designed in 1958 and implemented in 1960. ALGOL included a relational operator that tested for equality, allowing constructions like if x = 2 with essentially the same meaning of = as the conditional usage in mathematics. The equals sign was reserved for this usage.

Both usages have remained common in different programming languages into the early-21st century. As well as Fortran, = is used for assignment in such languages as C, Perl, Python, AWK and their descendants. But = is used for equality and not assignment in the Pascal family, Ada, Eiffel, APL, and other languages.

A few languages, such as BASIC and PL/I, have used the equals sign to mean both assignment and equality, distinguished by context. However, in most languages where = has one of these meanings, a different character or, more often, a sequence of characters is used for the other meaning. Following ALGOL, most languages that use = for equality use := for assignment, although APL, with its special character set, uses a left-pointing arrow.

Fortran did not have an equality operator (it was only possible to compare an expression to zero, using the arithmetic IF statement) until FORTRAN IV was released in 1962, since when it has used the four characters .EQ. to test for equality. The language B introduced the use of == with this meaning, which has been copied by its descendant C and most later languages where = means assignment.

Some languages additionally feature the "spaceship operator", or three-way comparison operator, <=>, to determine whether one value is less than, equal to, or greater than another.

=== Several equals signs ===
In some programming languages, == and === are used to check equality, so 1844 == 1844 will return true.

In PHP, the triple equals sign, ===, denotes value and type equality, meaning that not only do the two expressions evaluate to equal values, but they are also of the same data type. For instance, the expression 0 == false is true, but 0 === false is not, because the number 0 is an integer value whereas false is a Boolean value.

JavaScript has the same semantics for ===, referred to as "equality without type coercion". However, in JavaScript the behavior of == cannot be described by any simple consistent rules. The expression 0 == false is true, but 0 == undefined is false, even though both sides of the == act the same in Boolean context. For this reason it is sometimes recommended to avoid the == operator in JavaScript in favor of ===.

In Ruby, equality under == requires both operands to be of identical type, e.g. 0 == false is false. The === operator is flexible and may be defined arbitrarily for any given type. For example, a value of type Range is a range of integers, such as 1800..1899. (1800..1899) == 1844 is false, since the types are different (Range vs. Integer); however (1800..1899) === 1844 is true, since === on Range values means "inclusion in the range". Under these semantics, === is non-symmetric; e.g. 1844 === (1800..1899) is false, since it is interpreted to mean Integer#=== rather than Range#===.

== Other uses ==
=== Spelling ===
==== Tone letter ====
The equals sign is also used as a grammatical tone letter in the orthographies of Budu in the Congo-Kinshasa, in Krumen, Mwan and Dan in the Ivory Coast. The Unicode character used for the tone letter (U+A78A ꞊ MODIFIER LETTER SHORT EQUALS SIGN) is different from the mathematical symbol (U+003D).

==== Personal names ====
The signature of Santos-Dumont, showing a double hyphen that looks like an equals sign.

A possibly unique case of the equals sign of European usage in a person's name, specifically in a double-barreled name, was by the aviation pioneer Alberto Santos-Dumont, as he is also known not only to have often used a double hyphen ⹀ resembling an equal sign = between his two surnames in place of a hyphen, but also seems to have personally preferred that practice, to display equal respect for his father's French ethnicity and the Brazilian ethnicity of his mother.

Instead of a double hyphen, the equals sign is sometimes used in Japanese as a separator between names. In Ojibwe, the readily available equals sign on most keyboards is commonly used as a substitute for a double hyphen.

=== Linguistics ===
In linguistic interlinear glosses, an equals sign is conventionally used to mark clitic boundaries: the equals sign is placed between the clitic and the word that the clitic is attached to.

=== Chemistry ===
In chemical formulas, the two parallel lines denoting a double bond are commonly rendered using an equals sign (hence, a triple bond is commonly rendered using a triple bar).

=== LGBT activism ===
In recent years, the equals sign has been used as a symbol in favor of LGBT rights. It has been used since 1995 by the Human Rights Campaign, which lobbies for marriage equality, and subsequently by the United Nations Free & Equal, which promotes LGBT rights at the United Nations.

=== Telegrams and Telex ===
In Morse code the equals sign is encoded by the letters B ( ▄▄▄ ▄ ▄ ▄ ) and T ( ▄▄▄ ) run together ( ▄▄▄ ▄ ▄ ▄ ▄▄▄ ). The letters BT stand for 'Break Text', and are put between paragraphs, or groups of paragraphs in messages sent via Telex, a standardised tele-typewriter. The sign, used to mean 'Break Text', is given at the end of a telegram to separate the text of the message from the signature.

== Related symbols ==
=== Approximately equal ===
Symbols used to denote items that are approximately equal include the following:

- ≈ (U+2248 ≈ ALMOST EQUAL TO, LaTeX \approx)
- ≃ (U+2243 ≃ ASYMPTOTICALLY EQUAL TO, LaTeX \simeq), a combination of ≈ and =, also used to indicate asymptotic equality
- ≅ (U+2245 ≅ APPROXIMATELY EQUAL TO, LaTeX \cong), another combination of ≈ and =, which is also sometimes used to indicate isomorphism or congruence
- ∼ (U+223C ∼ TILDE OPERATOR, LaTeX \sim), which is also sometimes used to indicate proportionality or similarity, being related by an equivalence relation, or to indicate that a random variable is distributed according to a specific probability distribution (see also tilde), or alternatively between two quantities to indicate they are of the same order of magnitude.
- ∽ (U+223D ∽ REVERSED TILDE, LaTeX \backsim), which is also used to indicate proportionality
- ≐ (U+2250 ≐ APPROACHES THE LIMIT, LaTeX \doteq), which can also be used to represent the approach of a variable to a limit
- ≒ (U+2252 ≒ APPROXIMATELY EQUAL TO OR THE IMAGE OF, LaTeX \fallingdotseq), commonly used in Japan, Taiwan, and Korea.
- ≓ (U+2253 ≓ IMAGE OF OR APPROXIMATELY EQUAL TO, LaTeX \risingdotseq)

In some areas of East Asia, such as Japan, "≒" is used to mean "the two terms are almost equal", but in other areas and specialized literature such as mathematics, "≃" is often used. In addition to its mathematical meaning, it is sometimes used in Japanese sentences with the intention of "almost the same".

=== Not equal ===
The symbol used to denote inequation (when items are not equal) is a slashed equal sign ≠ (U+2260). In LaTeX, this is done with the "\neq" command.

Most programming languages, limiting themselves to the 7-bit ASCII character set and typeable characters, use ~=, !=, /=, or <> to represent their Boolean inequality operator.

=== Identity ===
The triple bar symbol ≡ (U+2261, LaTeX \equiv) is often used to indicate an identity, a definition (which can also be represented by U+225D ≝ EQUAL TO BY DEFINITION or U+2254 ≔ COLON EQUALS), or a congruence relation in modular arithmetic. Also, in chemistry, the triple bar can be used to represent a triple bond between atoms.

=== Isomorphism ===
The symbol ≅ is often used to indicate isomorphic algebraic structures or congruent geometric figures.

=== In logic ===
Equality of truth values (through bi-implication or logical equivalence), may be denoted by various symbols including =, ~, and ⇔.

=== In geometry ===
The symbol $\bumpeq$ (LaTeX \bumpeq) is used to show two directed line segments have the same length and direction, equipollence.

=== Other related symbols ===
Additional precomposed symbols with code points in Unicode for notations related to the equal sign include the following:

- ≌ (U+224C ≌ ALL EQUAL TO)
- ≔ (U+2254 ≔ COLON EQUALS) (used to define a symbol or assign a variable)
- ≕ (U+2255 ≕ EQUALS COLON) (defines the symbol on the right-hand side)
- ≖ (U+2256 ≖ RING IN EQUAL TO)
- ≗ (U+2257 ≗ RING EQUAL TO)
- ≘ (U+2258 ≘ CORRESPONDS TO)
- ≙ (U+2259 ≙ ESTIMATES) (the left-hand side is an estimator for the right-hand side)
- ≚ (U+225A ≚ EQUIANGULAR TO)
- ≛ (U+225B ≛ STAR EQUALS)
- ≜ (U+225C ≜ DELTA EQUAL TO) (used to define a symbol)
- ≞ (U+225E ≞ MEASURED BY)
- ≟ (U+225F ≟ QUESTIONED EQUAL TO)
- ⩴ (U+2A74 ⩴ DOUBLE COLON EQUAL) (see also Backus–Naur form for ::=)
- ⩵ (U+2A75 ⩵ TWO CONSECUTIVE EQUALS SIGNS)
- ⩶ (U+2A76 ⩶ THREE CONSECUTIVE EQUALS SIGNS)

== Incorrect usage ==
The equals sign is sometimes used incorrectly within a mathematical argument to connect math steps in a non-standard way, rather than to show equality (especially by early mathematics students).

For example, if one were finding the sum, step by step, of the numbers 1, 2, 3, 4, and 5, one might incorrectly write

1 + 2 = 3 + 3 = 6 + 4 = 10 + 5 = 15.

Structurally, this is shorthand for

([(1 + 2 = 3) + 3 = 6] + 4 = 10) + 5 = 15,

but the notation is incorrect, because each part of the equality has a different value. If interpreted strictly as it says, it would imply that

3 = 6 = 10 = 15 = 15.

A correct version of the argument would be

1 + 2 = 3, 3 + 3 = 6, 6 + 4 = 10, 10 + 5 = 15.

This difficulty results from subtly different uses of the sign in education. In early, arithmetic-focused grades, the equals sign may be operational; like the equal button on an electronic calculator, it demands the result of a calculation. Starting in algebra courses, the sign takes on a relational meaning of equality between two calculations. Confusion between the two uses of the sign sometimes persists at the university level.

== Encodings ==
- U+003D = EQUALS SIGN (&equals;)

Related symbols

- U+2260 ≠ NOT EQUAL TO (&ne;, &NotEqual;)
- U+FE66 ﹦ SMALL EQUALS SIGN
- U+FF1D ＝ FULLWIDTH EQUALS SIGN
- U+1F7F0 🟰 HEAVY EQUALS SIGN
- U+224D ≍ EQUIVALENT TO
- U+226D ≭ NOT EQUIVALENT TO
- U+2261 ≡ IDENTICAL TO
- U+2262 ≢ NOT IDENTICAL TO
- U+2263 ≣ STRICTLY EQUIVALENT TO

== See also ==
- 2 + 2 = 5
- Double hyphen
- Equality (mathematics)
- Logical equality
- Plus and minus signs
