= --- =

---, a string of three hyphen-minus characters, may refer to:

- Em dash (—) (as an approximation, or e.g. in TeX syntax)
- Horizontal rule (thematic break) in some markup languages (e.g. Markdown)
- Document separator in YAML
- 'O' letter in Morse code

== See also ==
- -- (disambiguation)
