= Syllabic alphabet =

Syllabic alphabet may refer to:

- Syllabary, writing system using symbols for syllables
- Abugida, writing system using symbols for consonant-vowel combinations (used to be called syllabic in the 19th century and syllabic alphabet by Coulmas)
  - Canadian Aboriginal syllabics, a family of abugidas used to write a number of Aboriginal Canadian languages
