= Double hyphen =

Historic punctuation mark (⹀)

Double oblique hyphen in a Fraktur typeface

In Latin script, the double hyphen ⹀ is a punctuation mark that consists of two parallel hyphens (‐). It was a development of the earlier double oblique hyphen ⸗, which developed from a Central European variant of the virgule slash, originally a form of scratch comma. Similar marks (see below) are used in other scripts.

In order to avoid it being confused with the equals sign =, the double hyphen is often shown as a double oblique hyphen in modern typography. The double hyphen is also not to be confused with two consecutive hyphens (--), which are often used to represent an em dash — or en dash – due to the limitations of typewriters and keyboards that do not have distinct hyphen and dash keys.

== Usage ==
Double hyphen appearance in several Fraktur typefaces

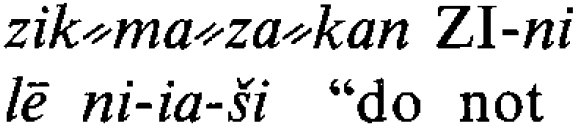
Double oblique hyphens (besides ordinary hyphens) used in a Hittite dictionary

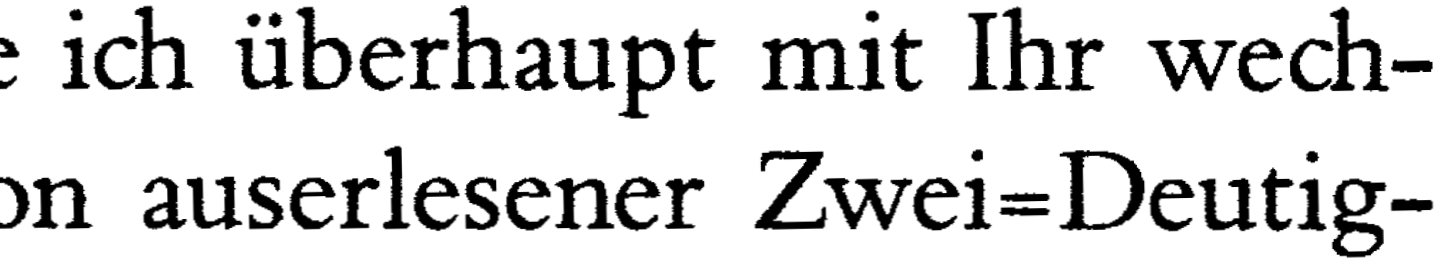
Double (straight) hyphen in an edition of stories by Arno Schmidt

The double hyphen is used for several different purposes throughout the world:

- Some typefaces, such as Fraktur faces, use the double hyphen as a glyphic variant of the single hyphen. (With Fraktur faces, such a double hyphen is usually oblique.)
- It may be also used for artistic or commercial purposes to achieve a distinctive visual effect. For example, the name of The Waldorf⹀Astoria hotel was officially written with a double hyphen from 1949 to 2009.
- In Merriam-Webster dictionaries if a word is divided at the end of the line, and the division point happens to be a hyphen, it is replaced with a double hyphen to graphically indicate that the divided word is normally hyphenated, for example cross⸗
  country.
- In several dictionaries published in the late nineteenth and early twentieth centuries, all such compound words are linked with double hyphens, whether at the end of the line or not, and the normal use of the single hyphen for non-compound words is retained. An example from the first or second page of such dictionaries is Aaron's⸗rod. Examples include the Century Dictionary and Funk & Wagnalls New Standard Dictionary of the English Language.
- It is used by Coptic language scholars to denote the form of the verb used before pronominal suffixes, e.g. ⲕⲟⲧ⸗ kot⹀ 'to build'.
- It is used by scholars of the Hittite language to separate clitics from the word to which they attach; this usage has been adopted by the Leipzig Glossing Rules.
- It is used as a distinct punctuation mark in Ojibwe language publications in the Fiero Roman orthography, as a hyphen is used to separate compound preverb units regardless of their line position, while a double hyphen is used to divide a word at the end of a line and can be treated as a soft hyphen. However, due to lack of availability of a double hyphen in most fonts, an equal sign is often used as a substitute.
- In Ojibwe, Cree and other languages using Unified Canadian syllabics, because final c (U+1428 ᐨ CANADIAN SYLLABICS FINAL SHORT HORIZONTAL STROKE) resembles a hyphen, a double hyphen (U+1400 ᐀ CANADIAN SYLLABICS HYPHEN) is used to distinguish the punctuation from the syllabics letter.
- In Japanese, the double hyphen (ダブルハイフン, daburu haifun) (U+30A0 ゠ KATAKANA-HIRAGANA DOUBLE HYPHEN) in rare cases replaces an English en dash or hyphen when writing foreign words in katakana due to their potential confusion with the prolonged sound mark (ー). It may be used to separate a person's given and family names, such as transcribing the name of Galileo Galilei as: ガリレオ゠ガリレイ. The middle dot (・) is however much more commonly used for these purposes. (For foreign names that include both spaces and hyphens, both the middle dot and double hyphen may appear together as in Catherine Zeta-Jones: キャサリン・ゼタ゠ジョーンズ.) The double hyphen is part of the JIS X 0213 standard, but is not included in more commonly used character encodings, such as Shift-JIS and EUC-JP. For this reason, the equals sign is frequently used in its place.
- In Volapük the double oblique hyphen (teilamalül) has to be used instead of the simple hyphen (yümamalül) to cut a word at the end of a line or in the compound words.

== Stylistic variant of the single hyphen ==
When the double hyphen is used as a functionally equivalent graphical variant (allograph) of the single hyphen, it has the same Unicode code point as a conventional hyphen (since how it is displayed/printed is a font choice on that occasion).

== Similar marks ==
Other forms of double hyphen are given unique codepoints in Unicode:

Name	Glyph	Code point	Purpose
CANADIAN SYLLABICS HYPHEN	᐀	U+1400	Canadian Aboriginal Syllabics to distinguish a hyphen from U+1428 CANADIAN SYLLABICS FINAL SHORT HORIZONTAL STROKE ( ᐨ )
DOUBLE OBLIQUE HYPHEN	⸗	U+2E17	Coptic and ancient Near Eastern language scholarship
DOUBLE HYPHEN	⹀	U+2E40	Generic (non-Asian) double hyphen
KATAKANA-HIRAGANA DOUBLE HYPHEN	゠	U+30A0	Japanese and orthography (in Katakana or Hiragana script)
MODIFIER LETTER SHORT EQUALS SIGN	꞊	U+A78A	Used as a tone letter and also to mark clitics in interlinear glossing

== See also ==
- U+2248 ≈ ALMOST EQUAL TO ()
- U+003D = EQUALS SIGN
- U+2550 ═ BOX DRAWINGS DOUBLE HORIZONTAL
- Double dash (disambiguation)
