= -- =

--, a string of two hyphen-minus characters, may approximate or refer to:

- Em dash (—), as a typewriter approximation
- Sig dashes (--), the email and Usenet signature delimiter
- The letter 'M' in Morse code
- A prefix for long options in Unix-like operating system commands; by itself, it typically means the end of command options
- The decrement operator in some programming languages
- Inline comments in some programming languages

== See also ==
- --- (disambiguation) (three hyphens)
- Double hyphen (one above the other)
- dash (–)
- HTML comment tag wrappers, <!-- and -->
- Horizontal rule, which is represented by ---- in MediaWiki markup
