= Unified Canadian Aboriginal Syllabics Extended-A =

- Range: U+11AB0..U+11ABF (16 code points)
- Plane: SMP
- Scripts: Canadian Aboriginal
- Assigned: 16 code points
- Unused: 0 reserved code points

Unicode version history
- 14.0 (2021): 16 (+16)

Unicode documentation
- Code chart ∣ Web page

Unified Canadian Aboriginal Syllabics Extended-A is a Unicode block containing extensions to the Canadian syllabics contained in the Unified Canadian Aboriginal Syllabics Unicode block. The extension adds missing characters for Nattilik and historical characters for Cree and Ojibwe.

Unified Canadian Aboriginal Syllabics Extended-A^{[1]} Official Unicode Consortium code chart (PDF)
	0	1	2	3	4	5	6	7	8	9	A	B	C	D	E	F
U+11ABx	𑪰	𑪱	𑪲	𑪳	𑪴	𑪵	𑪶	𑪷	𑪸	𑪹	𑪺	𑪻	𑪼	𑪽	𑪾	𑪿
Notes: 1. As of Unicode version 16.0

== History ==
The following Unicode-related documents record the purpose and process of defining specific characters in the Unified Canadian Aboriginal Syllabics Extended block:

Version	Final code points (Note: Proposed code points and characters names may differ from final code points and names)	Count	L2 ID	Document
14.0	U+11AB0..11ABF	16	L2/20-255	King, Kevin (2020-09-03), Proposal to encode 16 additional characters to the Unified Canadian Aboriginal Syllabics
14.0	U+11AB0..11ABF	16	L2/20-250	Anderson, Deborah; Whistler, Ken; Pournader, Roozbeh; Moore, Lisa; Constable, Peter; Liang, Hai (2020-10-01), "4. UCAS", Recommendations to UTC #165 October 2020 on Script Proposals
14.0	U+11AB0..11ABF	16	L2/20-237	Moore, Lisa (2020-10-27), "Consensus 165-C14", UTC #165 Minutes
