= Johannes Buteo =

French mathematician and logician

Johannes Buteo (born Jean Borrel, Latinized as Buteonis or given as Boteo, Buteon, Bateon) (c. 1485 – c. 1560) was a French mathematician and logician. Among his contributions was an attempt to calculate the supposed dimensions of Noah's Ark to fit all the world's animals.

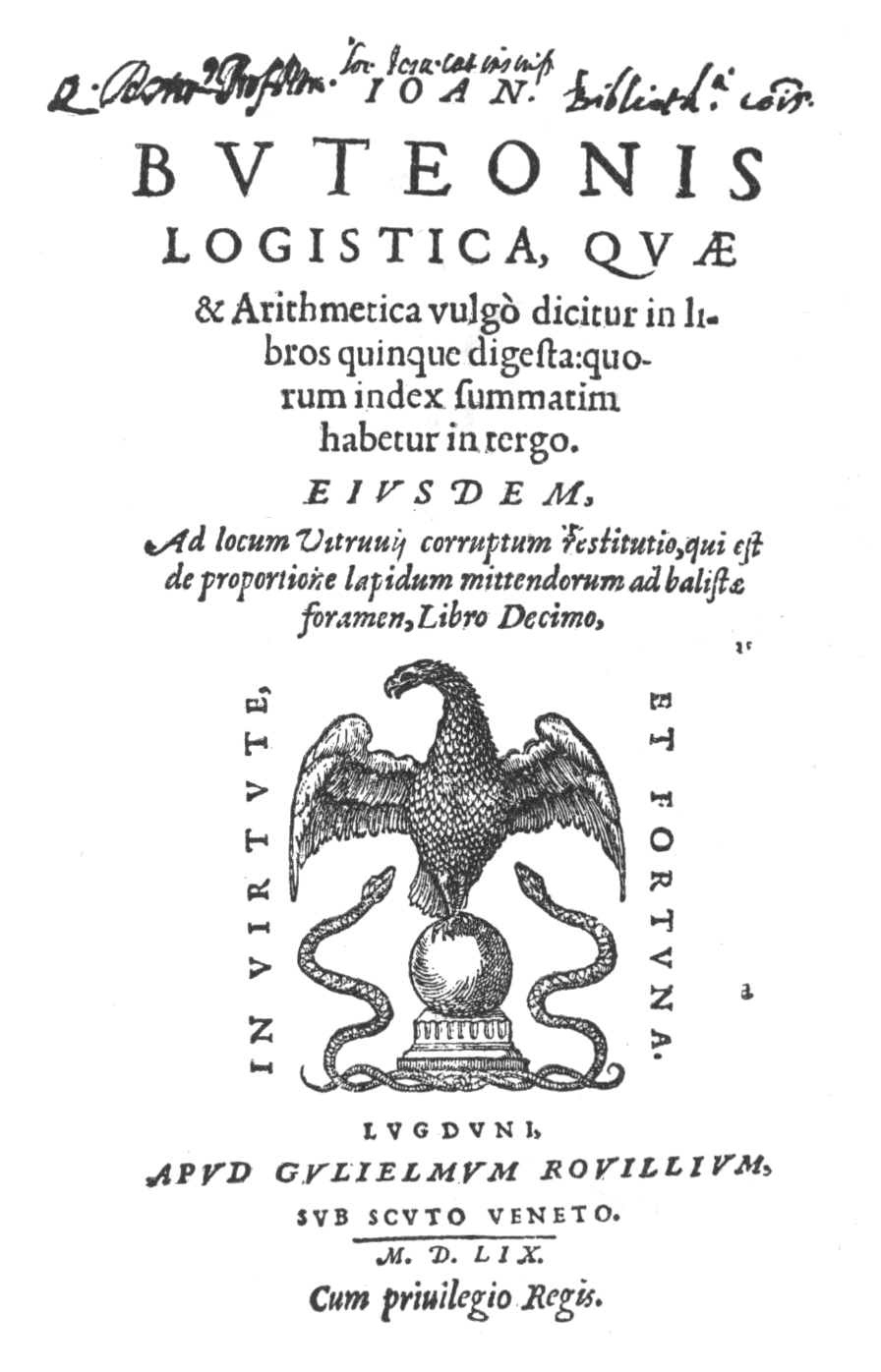
Title page of Logistica (1559)

Buteo was born in Dauphine or possibly Charpey and belonged to the order of St. Anthony. He studied under Oronce Fine and wrote on geometry and exposed Fine publishing a few books Opera Geometrica (1554), Logistica (1559), De quadratura circuli libri duo (1559). He died in a cloister about 1560-64 but some sources suggest he died in Canar in 1572. His contributions included a systematic way of eliminating unknowns in systems of linear equations which he demonstrated in Logistica with three equations and three unknowns.
