= Unified Canadian Aboriginal Syllabics Extended =

- Range: U+18B0..U+18FF (80 code points)
- Plane: BMP
- Scripts: Canadian Aboriginal
- Major alphabets: Cree; Ojibwe; Dene; Carrier
- Assigned: 70 code points
- Unused: 10 reserved code points

Unicode version history
- 5.2 (2009): 70 (+70)

Unicode documentation
- Code chart ∣ Web page

Unified Canadian Aboriginal Syllabics Extended is a Unicode block containing extensions to the Canadian syllabics contained in the Unified Canadian Aboriginal Syllabics Unicode block for some dialects of Cree, Ojibwe, Dene, and Carrier.

Unified Canadian Aboriginal Syllabics Extended^{[1]}^{[2]} Official Unicode Consortium code chart (PDF)
	0	1	2	3	4	5	6	7	8	9	A	B	C	D	E	F
U+18Bx	ᢰ	ᢱ	ᢲ	ᢳ	ᢴ	ᢵ	ᢶ	ᢷ	ᢸ	ᢹ	ᢺ	ᢻ	ᢼ	ᢽ	ᢾ	ᢿ
U+18Cx	ᣀ	ᣁ	ᣂ	ᣃ	ᣄ	ᣅ	ᣆ	ᣇ	ᣈ	ᣉ	ᣊ	ᣋ	ᣌ	ᣍ	ᣎ	ᣏ
U+18Dx	ᣐ	ᣑ	ᣒ	ᣓ	ᣔ	ᣕ	ᣖ	ᣗ	ᣘ	ᣙ	ᣚ	ᣛ	ᣜ	ᣝ	ᣞ	ᣟ
U+18Ex	ᣠ	ᣡ	ᣢ	ᣣ	ᣤ	ᣥ	ᣦ	ᣧ	ᣨ	ᣩ	ᣪ	ᣫ	ᣬ	ᣭ	ᣮ	ᣯ
U+18Fx	ᣰ	ᣱ	ᣲ	ᣳ	ᣴ	ᣵ										
Notes: 1. As of Unicode version 16.0; 2. Grey areas indicate non-assigned code points

== History ==
The following Unicode-related documents record the purpose and process of defining specific characters in the Unified Canadian Aboriginal Syllabics Extended block:

Version	Final code points (Note: Proposed code points and characters names may differ from final code points and names)	Count	L2 ID	WG2 ID	Document
5.2	U+18B0..18F5	70	L2/08-149	N3437	Everson, Michael; Harvey, Chris (2008-04-12), Preliminary proposal to encode additional Canadian Syllabics in the UCS
5.2	U+18B0..18F5	70	L2/08-132R	N3427R	Everson, Michael; Harvey, Chris (2008-05-11), Proposal to encode 39 Unified Canadian Aboriginal Syllabics
5.2	U+18B0..18F5	70	L2/08-318	N3453 (pdf, doc)	Umamaheswaran, V. S. (2008-08-13), "M52.19", Unconfirmed minutes of WG 2 meeting 52
5.2	U+18B0..18F5	70	L2/08-342	N3507	Everson, Michael (2008-10-06), Proposal to encode additional Unified Canadian Aboriginal Syllabics
5.2	U+18B0..18F5	70	L2/08-161R2		Moore, Lisa (2008-11-05), "Canadian Aboriginal Syllabics", UTC #115 Minutes
5.2	U+18B0..18F5	70	L2/08-412	N3553 (pdf, doc)	Umamaheswaran, V. S. (2008-11-05), "M53.14, M53.23", Unconfirmed minutes of WG 2 meeting 53
5.2	U+18B0..18F5	70	L2/08-361		Moore, Lisa (2008-12-02), "Consensus 117-C16, 117-C17", UTC #117 Minutes
5.2	U+18B0..18F5	70	L2/09-003R		Moore, Lisa (2009-02-12), "B.15.6", UTC #118 / L2 #215 Minutes
5.2	U+18B0..18F5	70	L2/09-018R	N3533R	Everson, Michael (2009-02-24), Proposed revision for Unified Canadian Aboriginal Syllabics Extended block
5.2	U+18B0..18F5	70	L2/09-234	N3603 (pdf, doc)	Umamaheswaran, V. S. (2009-07-08), "M54.01", Unconfirmed minutes of WG 2 meeting 54
5.2	U+18B0..18F5	70	L2/21-088		King, Kevin (2021-04-06), Proposed revisions to the representative characters of the Unified Canadian Aboriginal Syllabics code charts
5.2	U+18B0..18F5	70	L2/21-073		Anderson, Deborah; Whistler, Ken; Pournader, Roozbeh; Moore, Lisa; Liang, Hai (2021-04-23), "2. Unified Canadian Aboriginal Syllabics", Recommendations to UTC #167 April 2021 on Script Proposals
5.2	U+18B0..18F5	70	L2/21-066		Moore, Lisa (2021-05-05), "B. Script Ad Hoc Report", UTC #167 Minutes, "The UTC notes document L2/21-088, but takes no further action."
5.2	U+18B0..18F5	70	L2/21-141		King, Kevin (2021-07-07), Proposed changes to the representative glyphs of the Unified Canadian Aboriginal Syllabics code charts [Affects U+18DB, 18EC, 18F1-18F2, 18F5]
5.2	U+18B0..18F5	70	L2/21-130		Anderson, Deborah; Whistler, Ken; Pournader, Roozbeh; Liang, Hai (2021-07-26), "4. Unified Canadian Aboriginal Syllabics", Recommendations to UTC #168 July 2021 on Script Proposals
5.2	U+18B0..18F5	70	L2/21-123		Cummings, Craig (2021-08-03), "Consensus 168-C21", Draft Minutes of UTC Meeting 168, "Accept 186 changes for glyphs in the Unified Canadian Aboriginal Syllabics and Unified Canadian Aboriginal Syllabics Extended blocks"
