= Unified Canadian Aboriginal Syllabics =

- Range: U+1400..U+167F (640 code points)
- Plane: BMP
- Scripts: Canadian Aboriginal
- Major alphabets: Inuktitut; Carrier; Cree; Athapascan
- Assigned: 640 code points
- Unused: 0 reserved code points

Unicode version history
- 3.0 (1999): 630 (+630)
- 5.2 (2009): 640 (+10)

Unicode documentation
- Code chart ∣ Web page

Unified Canadian Aboriginal Syllabics is a Unicode block containing syllabic characters for writing Inuktitut, Carrier, Cree (along with several of its dialect-specific characters), Ojibwe, Blackfoot and Canadian Athabascan languages. Additions for some Cree dialects, Ojibwe, and Dene can be found at the Unified Canadian Aboriginal Syllabics Extended block.

== Block ==
Unified Canadian Aboriginal Syllabics^{[1]} Official Unicode Consortium code chart (PDF)
	0	1	2	3	4	5	6	7	8	9	A	B	C	D	E	F
U+140x	᐀	ᐁ	ᐂ	ᐃ	ᐄ	ᐅ	ᐆ	ᐇ	ᐈ	ᐉ	ᐊ	ᐋ	ᐌ	ᐍ	ᐎ	ᐏ
U+141x	ᐐ	ᐑ	ᐒ	ᐓ	ᐔ	ᐕ	ᐖ	ᐗ	ᐘ	ᐙ	ᐚ	ᐛ	ᐜ	ᐝ	ᐞ	ᐟ
U+142x	ᐠ	ᐡ	ᐢ	ᐣ	ᐤ	ᐥ	ᐦ	ᐧ	ᐨ	ᐩ	ᐪ	ᐫ	ᐬ	ᐭ	ᐮ	ᐯ
U+143x	ᐰ	ᐱ	ᐲ	ᐳ	ᐴ	ᐵ	ᐶ	ᐷ	ᐸ	ᐹ	ᐺ	ᐻ	ᐼ	ᐽ	ᐾ	ᐿ
U+144x	ᑀ	ᑁ	ᑂ	ᑃ	ᑄ	ᑅ	ᑆ	ᑇ	ᑈ	ᑉ	ᑊ	ᑋ	ᑌ	ᑍ	ᑎ	ᑏ
U+145x	ᑐ	ᑑ	ᑒ	ᑓ	ᑔ	ᑕ	ᑖ	ᑗ	ᑘ	ᑙ	ᑚ	ᑛ	ᑜ	ᑝ	ᑞ	ᑟ
U+146x	ᑠ	ᑡ	ᑢ	ᑣ	ᑤ	ᑥ	ᑦ	ᑧ	ᑨ	ᑩ	ᑪ	ᑫ	ᑬ	ᑭ	ᑮ	ᑯ
U+147x	ᑰ	ᑱ	ᑲ	ᑳ	ᑴ	ᑵ	ᑶ	ᑷ	ᑸ	ᑹ	ᑺ	ᑻ	ᑼ	ᑽ	ᑾ	ᑿ
U+148x	ᒀ	ᒁ	ᒂ	ᒃ	ᒄ	ᒅ	ᒆ	ᒇ	ᒈ	ᒉ	ᒊ	ᒋ	ᒌ	ᒍ	ᒎ	ᒏ
U+149x	ᒐ	ᒑ	ᒒ	ᒓ	ᒔ	ᒕ	ᒖ	ᒗ	ᒘ	ᒙ	ᒚ	ᒛ	ᒜ	ᒝ	ᒞ	ᒟ
U+14Ax	ᒠ	ᒡ	ᒢ	ᒣ	ᒤ	ᒥ	ᒦ	ᒧ	ᒨ	ᒩ	ᒪ	ᒫ	ᒬ	ᒭ	ᒮ	ᒯ
U+14Bx	ᒰ	ᒱ	ᒲ	ᒳ	ᒴ	ᒵ	ᒶ	ᒷ	ᒸ	ᒹ	ᒺ	ᒻ	ᒼ	ᒽ	ᒾ	ᒿ
U+14Cx	ᓀ	ᓁ	ᓂ	ᓃ	ᓄ	ᓅ	ᓆ	ᓇ	ᓈ	ᓉ	ᓊ	ᓋ	ᓌ	ᓍ	ᓎ	ᓏ
U+14Dx	ᓐ	ᓑ	ᓒ	ᓓ	ᓔ	ᓕ	ᓖ	ᓗ	ᓘ	ᓙ	ᓚ	ᓛ	ᓜ	ᓝ	ᓞ	ᓟ
U+14Ex	ᓠ	ᓡ	ᓢ	ᓣ	ᓤ	ᓥ	ᓦ	ᓧ	ᓨ	ᓩ	ᓪ	ᓫ	ᓬ	ᓭ	ᓮ	ᓯ
U+14Fx	ᓰ	ᓱ	ᓲ	ᓳ	ᓴ	ᓵ	ᓶ	ᓷ	ᓸ	ᓹ	ᓺ	ᓻ	ᓼ	ᓽ	ᓾ	ᓿ
U+150x	ᔀ	ᔁ	ᔂ	ᔃ	ᔄ	ᔅ	ᔆ	ᔇ	ᔈ	ᔉ	ᔊ	ᔋ	ᔌ	ᔍ	ᔎ	ᔏ
U+151x	ᔐ	ᔑ	ᔒ	ᔓ	ᔔ	ᔕ	ᔖ	ᔗ	ᔘ	ᔙ	ᔚ	ᔛ	ᔜ	ᔝ	ᔞ	ᔟ
U+152x	ᔠ	ᔡ	ᔢ	ᔣ	ᔤ	ᔥ	ᔦ	ᔧ	ᔨ	ᔩ	ᔪ	ᔫ	ᔬ	ᔭ	ᔮ	ᔯ
U+153x	ᔰ	ᔱ	ᔲ	ᔳ	ᔴ	ᔵ	ᔶ	ᔷ	ᔸ	ᔹ	ᔺ	ᔻ	ᔼ	ᔽ	ᔾ	ᔿ
U+154x	ᕀ	ᕁ	ᕂ	ᕃ	ᕄ	ᕅ	ᕆ	ᕇ	ᕈ	ᕉ	ᕊ	ᕋ	ᕌ	ᕍ	ᕎ	ᕏ
U+155x	ᕐ	ᕑ	ᕒ	ᕓ	ᕔ	ᕕ	ᕖ	ᕗ	ᕘ	ᕙ	ᕚ	ᕛ	ᕜ	ᕝ	ᕞ	ᕟ
U+156x	ᕠ	ᕡ	ᕢ	ᕣ	ᕤ	ᕥ	ᕦ	ᕧ	ᕨ	ᕩ	ᕪ	ᕫ	ᕬ	ᕭ	ᕮ	ᕯ
U+157x	ᕰ	ᕱ	ᕲ	ᕳ	ᕴ	ᕵ	ᕶ	ᕷ	ᕸ	ᕹ	ᕺ	ᕻ	ᕼ	ᕽ	ᕾ	ᕿ
U+158x	ᖀ	ᖁ	ᖂ	ᖃ	ᖄ	ᖅ	ᖆ	ᖇ	ᖈ	ᖉ	ᖊ	ᖋ	ᖌ	ᖍ	ᖎ	ᖏ
U+159x	ᖐ	ᖑ	ᖒ	ᖓ	ᖔ	ᖕ	ᖖ	ᖗ	ᖘ	ᖙ	ᖚ	ᖛ	ᖜ	ᖝ	ᖞ	ᖟ
U+15Ax	ᖠ	ᖡ	ᖢ	ᖣ	ᖤ	ᖥ	ᖦ	ᖧ	ᖨ	ᖩ	ᖪ	ᖫ	ᖬ	ᖭ	ᖮ	ᖯ
U+15Bx	ᖰ	ᖱ	ᖲ	ᖳ	ᖴ	ᖵ	ᖶ	ᖷ	ᖸ	ᖹ	ᖺ	ᖻ	ᖼ	ᖽ	ᖾ	ᖿ
U+15Cx	ᗀ	ᗁ	ᗂ	ᗃ	ᗄ	ᗅ	ᗆ	ᗇ	ᗈ	ᗉ	ᗊ	ᗋ	ᗌ	ᗍ	ᗎ	ᗏ
U+15Dx	ᗐ	ᗑ	ᗒ	ᗓ	ᗔ	ᗕ	ᗖ	ᗗ	ᗘ	ᗙ	ᗚ	ᗛ	ᗜ	ᗝ	ᗞ	ᗟ
U+15Ex	ᗠ	ᗡ	ᗢ	ᗣ	ᗤ	ᗥ	ᗦ	ᗧ	ᗨ	ᗩ	ᗪ	ᗫ	ᗬ	ᗭ	ᗮ	ᗯ
U+15Fx	ᗰ	ᗱ	ᗲ	ᗳ	ᗴ	ᗵ	ᗶ	ᗷ	ᗸ	ᗹ	ᗺ	ᗻ	ᗼ	ᗽ	ᗾ	ᗿ
U+160x	ᘀ	ᘁ	ᘂ	ᘃ	ᘄ	ᘅ	ᘆ	ᘇ	ᘈ	ᘉ	ᘊ	ᘋ	ᘌ	ᘍ	ᘎ	ᘏ
U+161x	ᘐ	ᘑ	ᘒ	ᘓ	ᘔ	ᘕ	ᘖ	ᘗ	ᘘ	ᘙ	ᘚ	ᘛ	ᘜ	ᘝ	ᘞ	ᘟ
U+162x	ᘠ	ᘡ	ᘢ	ᘣ	ᘤ	ᘥ	ᘦ	ᘧ	ᘨ	ᘩ	ᘪ	ᘫ	ᘬ	ᘭ	ᘮ	ᘯ
U+163x	ᘰ	ᘱ	ᘲ	ᘳ	ᘴ	ᘵ	ᘶ	ᘷ	ᘸ	ᘹ	ᘺ	ᘻ	ᘼ	ᘽ	ᘾ	ᘿ
U+164x	ᙀ	ᙁ	ᙂ	ᙃ	ᙄ	ᙅ	ᙆ	ᙇ	ᙈ	ᙉ	ᙊ	ᙋ	ᙌ	ᙍ	ᙎ	ᙏ
U+165x	ᙐ	ᙑ	ᙒ	ᙓ	ᙔ	ᙕ	ᙖ	ᙗ	ᙘ	ᙙ	ᙚ	ᙛ	ᙜ	ᙝ	ᙞ	ᙟ
U+166x	ᙠ	ᙡ	ᙢ	ᙣ	ᙤ	ᙥ	ᙦ	ᙧ	ᙨ	ᙩ	ᙪ	ᙫ	ᙬ	᙭	᙮	ᙯ
U+167x	ᙰ	ᙱ	ᙲ	ᙳ	ᙴ	ᙵ	ᙶ	ᙷ	ᙸ	ᙹ	ᙺ	ᙻ	ᙼ	ᙽ	ᙾ	ᙿ
Notes: 1. As of Unicode version 16.0

== History ==
The following Unicode-related documents record the purpose and process of defining specific characters in the Unified Canadian Aboriginal Syllabics block:

Version	Final code points (Note: Proposed code points and characters names may differ from final code points and names)	Count	UTC ID	L2 ID	WG2 ID	Document
3.0	U+1401..166E	622		X3L2/90-151	N658	Inuktitut and Cree Char. Sets in 10646, 1990-09-11
3.0	U+1401..166E	622	UTC/1991-070			Umamaheswaran, V. S. (1991-04-30), Committee Correspondence
3.0	U+1401..166E	622			N956	Report on the Encoding for Canadian Aboriginal Syllabic Languages, 1993-11-04
3.0	U+1401..166E	622			N978	Everson, Michael (1994-03-04), Comment on document N 956, Report on the Encoding for Canadian Aboriginal Syllabic Languages
3.0	U+1401..166E	622			N984	Canadian Aboriginal Syllabics: Character Set Coding Requirements, 1994-04-18
3.0	U+1401..166E	622			N1073	Ross, Hugh McGregor (1994-09-21), Enhanced Proposal for Canadian Aboriginal Scripts
3.0	U+1401..166E	622	UTC/1994-032			Aliprand, Joan; Greenfield, Steve (1994-09-30), "Presentation on Canadian Aboriginal Scripts", Unicode Technical Committee Meeting #62, Friday, September 30, 1994, Toronto, Ontario, Minutes
3.0	U+1401..166E	622			N1104	Everson, Michael (1994-10-11), Proposed Unified Canadian Syllabic Character Set Repertoire, version 2.0 (Comment on WG2 N984)
3.0	U+1401..166E	622		X3L2/96-063		Proposed pDAM for Unified Canadian Aboriginal Syllabics, 1996-05-28
3.0	U+1401..166E	622			N1441	Proposed pDAM for Unified Canadian Aboriginal Syllabics, 1996-06-10
3.0	U+1401..166E	622	UTC/1996-027.2			Greenfield, Steve (1996-07-01), "D. Canadian Aboriginal Syllabics", UTC #69 Minutes (PART 2)
3.0	U+1401..166E	622			N1472	Paterson, Bruce (1996-11-20), pDAM 11 - Unified Canadian Aboriginal Syllabics
3.0	U+1401..166E	622			N1453	Ksar, Mike; Umamaheswaran, V. S. (1996-12-06), "8.8", WG 2 Minutes - Quebec Meeting 31
3.0	U+1401..166E	622		L2/97-005		Paterson, Bruce (1997-01-28), ISO/IEC 10646-1/FPDAM 11: Canadian Aboriginal Syllabics Script
3.0	U+1401..166E	622			N1595	Summary of Voting on SC 2 N 2806, Combined PDAM Registration and FPDAM ballot: Amendment 11: Canadian Aboriginal Syllabics Script, 1997-06-17
3.0	U+1401..166E	622		L2/97-223	N1644	Paterson, Bruce; Everson, Michael (1997-09-11), Revised Text of ISO/IEC 10646-1/FPDAM 11 - Unified Canadian Aboriginal Syllabics
3.0	U+1401..166E	622		L2/97-224		Paterson, Bruce (1997-09-11), Disposition of Comments Report for ISO/IEC 10646-1/FPDAM 11 Unified Canadian Aboriginal Syllabics
3.0	U+1401..166E	622		L2/97-288	N1603	Umamaheswaran, V. S. (1997-10-24), "6.3", Unconfirmed Meeting Minutes, WG 2 Meeting # 33, Heraklion, Crete, Greece, 20 June – 4 July 1997
3.0	U+1401..166E	622		L2/98-128		Text for FDAM ballot ISO 10646 Amendment 11 - Unified Canadian Aboriginal Syllabics, 1998-03-05
3.0	U+1401..166E	622		L2/01-291		Jancewicz, Bill (2001-08-07), Unified Canadian Aboriginal Syllabics [proposed correction of shapes]
3.0	U+1401..166E	622		L2/16-164		Larabie, Ray; et al. (2016-05-16), CANADIAN SYLLABICS SHA U+1515 Font Support
3.0	U+1401..166E	622		L2/18-274		McGowan, Rick (2018-09-14), "U+166D CANADIAN SYLLABICS CHI SIGN", Comments on Public Review Issues (July 24 - Sept 14, 2018)
3.0	U+1401..166E	622		L2/18-272		Moore, Lisa (2018-10-29), "Consensus 157-C16", UTC #157 Minutes, "Change the general category of U+166D CANADIAN SYLLABICS CHI SIGN from "Po" to "So" and make it Terminal_Punctuation=No."
3.0	U+1401..166E	622		L2/21-088		King, Kevin (2021-04-06), Proposed revisions to the representative characters of the Unified Canadian Aboriginal Syllabics code charts
3.0	U+1401..166E	622		L2/21-073		Anderson, Deborah; Whistler, Ken; Pournader, Roozbeh; Moore, Lisa; Liang, Hai (2021-04-23), "2. Unified Canadian Aboriginal Syllabics", Recommendations to UTC #167 April 2021 on Script Proposals
3.0	U+1401..166E	622		L2/21-066		Moore, Lisa (2021-05-05), "B. Script Ad Hoc Report", UTC #167 Minutes, "The UTC notes document L2/21-088, but takes no further action."
3.0	U+1401..166E	622		L2/21-141		King, Kevin (2021-07-07), Proposed changes to the representative glyphs of the Unified Canadian Aboriginal Syllabics code charts [Affects U+144B, 14D1, 1506, 15C0-15C3, 15E8-15EE, 1601, 1604-1607, 160A-160D, 1614-162D, 1630-163F, 1646-1647, 165A]
3.0	U+1401..166E	622		L2/21-130		Anderson, Deborah; Whistler, Ken; Pournader, Roozbeh; Liang, Hai (2021-07-26), "4. Unified Canadian Aboriginal Syllabics", Recommendations to UTC #168 July 2021 on Script Proposals
3.0	U+1401..166E	622		L2/21-123		Cummings, Craig (2021-08-03), "Consensus 168-C21", Draft Minutes of UTC Meeting 168, "Accept 186 changes for glyphs in the Unified Canadian Aboriginal Syllabics and Unified Canadian Aboriginal Syllabics Extended blocks"
3.0	U+166F..1676	8		L2/97-274	N1655	Vermeulen, Dirk; Everson, Michael (1997-10-08), Canadian Syllabics missing from DAM 11
3.0	U+166F..1676	8		L2/98-039		Aliprand, Joan; Winkler, Arnold (1998-02-24), "3.A.1. NEW PROPOSALS a. Additional Canadian Syllabics", Preliminary Minutes - UTC #74 & L2 #171, Mountain View, CA - December 5, 1997
3.0	U+166F..1676	8		L2/98-286	N1703	Umamaheswaran, V. S.; Ksar, Mike (1998-07-02), "8.10", Unconfirmed Meeting Minutes, WG 2 Meeting #34, Redmond, WA, USA; 1998-03-16--20
3.0	U+166F..1676	8		L2/98-321	N1905	Revised text of 10646-1/FPDAM 23, AMENDMENT 23: Bopomofo Extended and other characters, 1998-10-22
3.0	U+166F..1676	8		L2/99-010	N1903 (pdf, html, doc)	Umamaheswaran, V. S. (1998-12-30), "6.7.6", Minutes of WG 2 meeting 35, London, U.K.; 1998-09-21--25
5.2	U+1400, 1677..167F	10		L2/08-132R	N3427R	Everson, Michael; Harvey, Chris (2008-05-11), Proposal to encode 39 Unified Canadian Aboriginal Syllabics
5.2	U+1400, 1677..167F	10		L2/08-318	N3453 (pdf, doc)	Umamaheswaran, V. S. (2008-08-13), "M52.19", Unconfirmed minutes of WG 2 meeting 52
5.2	U+1400, 1677..167F	10		L2/08-161R2		Moore, Lisa (2008-11-05), "Canadian Aboriginal Syllabics", UTC #115 Minutes
