= Ojibwe writing systems =

Writing system

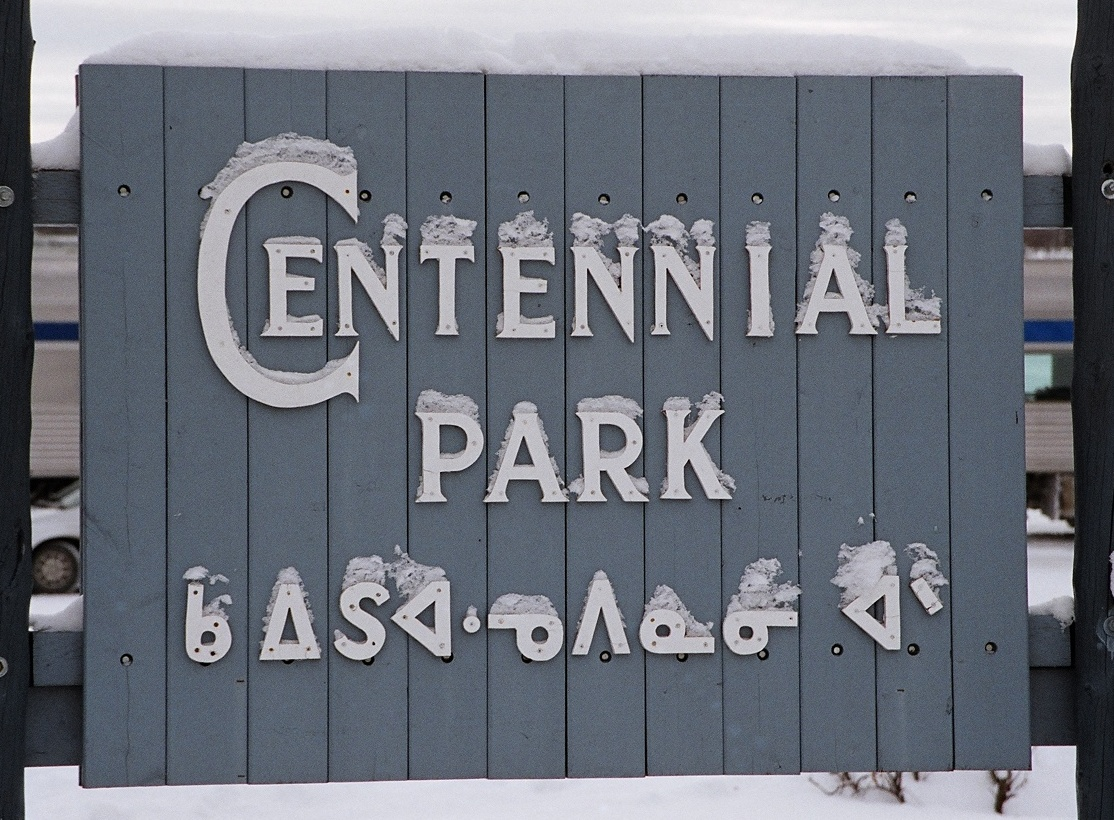
A sign in Sioux Lookout, Ontario, with Ojibwe syllabics. The partially pointed syllabics text says ᑳᐃᔑᐊᓉᐱᓈᓂᐗᐣᐠ (Gaa-izhi-anwebinaaniwang, "the place where people repose"; unpointed as ᑲᐃᔑᐊᓉᐱᓇᓂᐧᐊᐠ), but with the ⟨ᐧ⟩ w missing from the last syllable.

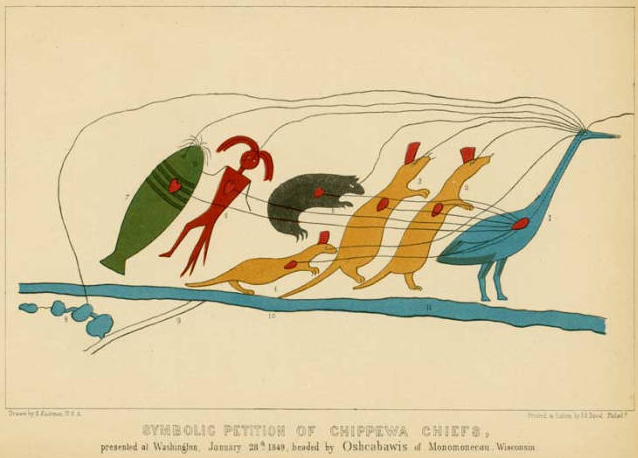
This pictographic 1849 petition was presented to the President of the United States by Chief Oshkaabewis and other Ojibwe leaders from the headwaters of the Wisconsin River and complains of broken promises in the 1837 and 1842 treaties. The tribes are represented by their totems, martens, bear, man and catfish, led by the crane. Lines running from the heart and eye of each animal to the heart and eye of the crane denote that they are all of one mind; and a line runs from the eye of the crane to the lakes, shown in the «map» in the lower left-hand corner.

Ojibwe is an indigenous language of North America from the Algonquian language family. Ojibwe is one of the largest Native American languages north of Mexico in terms of number of speakers and is characterized by a series of dialects, some of which differ significantly. The dialects of Ojibwe are spoken in Canada from southwestern Quebec, through Ontario, Manitoba and parts of Saskatchewan, with outlying communities in Alberta and British Columbia, and in the United States from Michigan through Wisconsin and Minnesota, with a number of communities in North Dakota and Montana, as well as migrant groups in Kansas and Oklahoma.

The absence of linguistic or political unity among Ojibwe-speaking groups is associated with the relative autonomy of the regional dialects of Ojibwe. There is no single dialect that is considered the most prestigious or most prominent, and no standard writing system used to represent all dialects. Ojibwe dialects have been written in numerous ways over a period of several centuries, with the development of different written traditions reflecting a range of influences from the orthographic practices of other languages.

Writing systems associated with particular dialects have been developed by adapting the Latin script, usually the English or French orthographies. A widely used Roman character-based writing system is the double vowel system, attributed to Charles Fiero. The double vowel system is quickly gaining popularity among language teachers in the United States and Canada because of its ease of use.

A syllabic writing system not related to English or French writing is used by some Ojibwe speakers in northern Ontario and Manitoba. Development of the original form of Canadian Aboriginal syllabics is credited to missionary James Evans around 1840.

The Great Lakes Algonquian syllabics are based on French orthography with letters organized into syllables. It was primarily used by speakers of Fox, Potawatomi, and Winnebago, but there is indirect evidence of use by speakers of Chippewa ("Southwestern Ojibwe").

== Anishinaabewibii'iganan ==
Example of a Birch bark scroll piece

Anishinaabewibii'iganan can refer to the body of Ojibwe symbols found as petroglyphs, on story-hides, and on Midewiwin wiigwaasabakoon, similar to the Mi'kmaw Suckerfish script. Not much is known to academia regarding these glyphs, though there are said to be several Ojibwe elders who still know the meanings of many of the symbols. As their content is considered sacred, however, very little information about them has been shared with outsiders.. Knowledgeable Ojibwe consulted with James Evans on the creation of Canadian Aboriginal Syllabics but any relationship between Anishinaabewibii'iganan and that writing system is not known.

In treaty negotiations with the British, the treaty-signing chiefs would often mark an "X" for their signature and then use the Wiigwaasabak character representing their totem. Today, Ojibwe artists commonly incorporate motifs found in the Wiigwaasabak to instill "Native Pride."

The term itself: "Anishinaabewibii'iganan", simply means Ojibwe/Anishinaabe or "Indian" writings and can encompass a far larger meaning than only the historical pictographic script. Indeed, Anishinaabewibii'iganan may describe the pictographic script better since its connections with non-Anishinaabe or -Ojibwe nations extend deeply.

== Romanized Ojibwe systems ==
=== Modern Latin alphabets ===
The different systems used to write Ojibwe are typically distinguished by their representation of key features of the Ojibwe inventory of sounds. Differences include: the representation of vowel length, the representation of nasal vowels, the representation of fortis and lenis consonants; and the representation of consonants which require an International Phonetic Alphabet (IPA) symbol that differs significantly from the conventional alphabetic symbol.

==== Double vowel system ====
The double vowel orthography is an adaptation of the linguistically oriented system found in publications such as Leonard Bloomfield's Eastern Ojibwa. Its name arises from the use of doubled vowel symbols to represent long vowels that are paired with corresponding short vowels; a variant in which long vowels are represented with a macron (ˉ) over short vowels is also reported for several publications in the early 1970s. Development of the double vowel system is attributed to Charles Fiero. At a conference held to discuss the development of a common Ojibwe orthography, Ojibwe language educators agreed that the double vowel system was a preferred choice but recognized that other systems were also used and preferred in some locations. The double vowel system is widely favored among language teachers in the United States and Canada and is taught in a program for Ojibwe language teachers.

The double vowel orthography is used to write several dialects of Ojibwe spoken in the circum-Great Lakes area. Significant publications in Chippewa (Southwestern Ojibwe) include a widely used dictionary and a collection of texts. The same system with minor differences is used for several publications in the Ottawa and Eastern Ojibwe dialects (see below Ottawa-Eastern Ojibwe double vowel system).

One of the goals underlying the double vowel orthography is promoting standardization of Ojibwe writing so that language learners are able to read and write in a consistent way. By comparison, folk phonetic spelling approaches to writing Ottawa based on less systematic adaptations of written English or French are more variable and idiosyncratic and do not always make consistent use of alphabetic letters.

Letters of the English alphabet substitute for specialized phonetic symbols, in conjunction with orthographic conventions unique to Ojibwe. The system embodies two principles: (1) alphabetic letters from the English alphabet are used to write Ojibwe but with Ojibwe sound values; (2) the system is phonemic in nature in that each letter or letter combination indicates its basic sound value and does not reflect all the phonetic detail that occurs. Accurate pronunciation thus cannot be learned without consulting a fluent speaker.

The long vowels /iː, oː, aː/ are paired with the short vowels /i, o, a/, and are written with double symbols ⟨ii, oo, aa⟩ that correspond to the single symbols used for the short vowels ⟨i, o, a⟩. The long vowel /eː/ does not have a corresponding short vowel, and is written with a single ⟨e⟩.

The short vowels are: ⟨i, o, a⟩.

Short vowels (Southwestern Ojibwe dialect)
Phoneme	Phonetic	Ojibwe examples	Gloss	English equivalent
i	[ɪ]	inini	'man'	pin
i	[ɪ]	mawi	'cries'	pin
o	[o] ~ [ʊ]	ozid	'someone's foot'	obey, book
o	[o] ~ [ʊ]	anokii	'works'	obey, book
o	[o] ~ [ʊ]	nibo	'dies, is dead'	obey, book
a	[ə] ~ [ʌ]	agim	'count someone!'	but
a	[ə] ~ [ʌ]	namadabi	'sits down'	but
a	[ə] ~ [ʌ]	baashkizigan	'gun'	but

The long vowels are: ⟨ii, oo, aa, e⟩.

Long vowels (Southwestern Ojibwe dialect)
Phoneme	Phonetic	Ojibwe examples	Gloss	English equivalent
ii	[iː]	niin	'I, me'	seen
ii	[iː]	googii	'dives'	seen
oo	[oː] ~ [uː]	oodena	'town'	boat, boot
oo	[oː] ~ [uː]	anookii	'hires'	boat, boot
oo	[oː] ~ [uː]	goon	'snow'	boat, boot
oo	[oː] ~ [uː]	bimibatoo	'runs along'	boat, boot
aa	[aː]	aagim	'snowshoe'	father
aa	[aː]	maajaa	'goes away'	father
e	[eː] ~ [ɛː]	emikwaan	'spoon'	café
e	[eː] ~ [ɛː]	awenen	'who'	café
e	[eː] ~ [ɛː]	anishinaabe	'person, Ojibwe'	café

The short vowel represented as orthographic ⟨a⟩ has values centering on [ə ~ ʌ]; short ⟨i⟩ has values centering on [ɪ]; and short ⟨o⟩ has values centring on [o ~ ʊ]. The long vowel ⟨aa⟩ has values centering on [aː]; long ⟨ii⟩ has values centering on [iː]; and long ⟨oo⟩ has values centering on [oː ~ uː]. The long vowel ⟨e⟩ has values centering on [eː ~ ɛː].

The long nasal vowels are phonetically [ĩː], [ẽː], [ãː], and [õː]. They most commonly occur in the final syllable of nouns with diminutive suffixes or words with a diminutive connotation. Orthographically they are represented differently in word-final position as opposed to word-internally.

In the final syllable of a word the long vowel is followed by word-final ⟨nh⟩ to indicate that it is nasal; the use of ⟨h⟩ is an orthographic convention and does not correspond to an independent sound. The examples in the table below are from the Ottawa dialect.

Long nasal vowels in word-final position
Nasal Vowel	Example	English
-iinh	kiwenziinh	'old man'
-iinh	wesiinh	'(small) animal'
-enh	mdimooyenh	'old woman'
-enh	nzhishenh	'my uncle'
-aanh	bnaajaanh	'nestling'
-oonh	zhashkoonh	'muskrat'
-oonh	boodoonh	'polliwog, tadpole'

Word-internally long nasal vowels are represented by orthographic ⟨ny⟩, as in Southwestern Ojibwe mindimooyenyag 'old women'.

The nasalized allophones of the vowels, which occur predictably preceding the nasal+fricative clusters ns, nz, and nzh are not indicated in writing, in words such as gaawiin ingikendanziin "I don't know it", jiimaanens "small boat", and oshkanzhiin "someone's fingernail(s)". Long vowels after the nasal consonants ⟨m⟩ or ⟨n⟩ are frequently nasalized, particularly when followed by ⟨s, sh, z, or zh⟩. In such cases the nasalization is sometimes overtly indicated by optionally writing ⟨n⟩ immediately after the vowel: moonz or mooz "moose."

In the original Double Vowel system, nasal long vowels now represented with ⟨-ny-⟩/⟨-nh⟩ were written with the ogonek diacritic in some publications, while in others they are represented by underlining the vowel. The Double Vowel system used today employing ⟨-ny-⟩/⟨-nh⟩ for long nasal vowels is sometimes called "Fiero-Nichols Double Vowel system" since John Nichols popularized this convention.

The affricates /tʃ/ and /dʒ/ are written ⟨ch⟩ and ⟨j⟩, and the fricatives /ʃ/ and /ʒ/ are written ⟨sh⟩ and ⟨zh⟩. The semivowels /j/ and /w/ are written ⟨y⟩ and ⟨w⟩.

The lenis obstruents are written using voiced characters: ⟨b, d, g, j, z, zh⟩.

Lenis consonants (Southwestern Ojibwe dialect)
Phoneme	Phonetic	Ojibwe examples	Gloss	English equivalent
b	[b] ~ [p]	bakade	'is hungry'	bit, spit
b	[b] ~ [p]	nibi	'water'	bit, spit
b	[b] ~ [p]	gigizheb	'in the morning'	bit, spit
d	[d] ~ [t]	debwe	'tells the truth'	do, stop
d	[d] ~ [t]	biidoon	'bring it'	do, stop
d	[d] ~ [t]	waagaakwad	'ax'	do, stop
g	[ɡ] ~ [k]	giin	'you'	geese, ski
g	[ɡ] ~ [k]	waagosh	'fox'	geese, ski
g	[ɡ] ~ [k]	ikwewag	'women'	geese, ski
j	[dʒ] ~ [tʃ]	jiimaan	'boat, canoe'	jump, watch
j	[dʒ] ~ [tʃ]	ajina	'a little while'	jump, watch
j	[dʒ] ~ [tʃ]	ingiikaj	'I'm cold'	jump, watch
z	[z] ~ [s]	ziibi	'river'	zebra, miss
z	[z] ~ [s]	ozid	'someone's foot'	zebra, miss
z	[z] ~ [s]	indaakoz	'I am sick'	zebra, miss
zh	[ʒ] ~ [ʃ]	zhabonigan	'needle'	measure, wash
zh	[ʒ] ~ [ʃ]	azhigan	'sock'	measure, wash
zh	[ʒ] ~ [ʃ]	biizh	'bring someone!'	measure, wash

The fortis consonants use voiceless characters: ⟨p, t, k, ch, s, sh⟩.

Fortis consonants (Southwestern Ojibwe dialect)
Phoneme	Phonetic	Ojibwe examples	Gloss	English equivalent
p	[pː]	opin	'potato'	rip
p	[pː]	imbaap	'I laugh'	rip
t	[tː]	ate	'(something) is there'	pit
t	[tː]	anit	'fish spear'	pit
k	[kː]	makizin	'moccasin shoe'	pick
k	[kː]	amik	'beaver'	pick
ch	[tʃː]	michaa	'is big'	stitch
ch	[tʃː]	miigwech	'thank you'	stitch
s	[sː]	asin	'stone, rock'	miss
s	[sː]	wiiyaas	'meat'	miss
sh	[ʃː]	ashigan	'bass'	bush
sh	[ʃː]	animosh	'dog'	bush

The remaining consonants are written ⟨m, n, w, y, h⟩, in addition to the glottal stop /ʔ/, which is written ⟨'⟩.

Other consonants (Southwestern Ojibwe dialect)
Phoneme	Phonetic	Ojibwe examples	Gloss	English equivalent
m	[m]	miinan	'five'	man
m	[m]	jiimaan	'boat, canoe'	man
m	[m]	miijim	'food'	man
n	[n], [ŋ] before g, k	naanan	'five'	name, ankle
n	[n], [ŋ] before g, k	bangii	'a little bit'	name, ankle
w	[w]	waabang	'tomorrow'	way
w	[w]	giiwe	'goes home'	way
w	[w]	bizindaw	'listen to someone!'	way
y	[j]	wiiyaw	'somebody's body'	yellow
y	[j]	inday	'my dog'	yellow
h	[h]	hay		hi
'	[ʔ]	bakite'an	'hit it!'	uh-oh
'	[ʔ]	ode'	'someone's heart'	uh-oh

Although the double vowel system treats the digraphs ⟨ch, sh, zh⟩ each as single sounds, they are alphabetized as two distinct letters. The long vowel written with double symbols are treated as units and alphabetized after the corresponding short vowel. The resulting alphabetical order is:

a aa b (ch) d e g h ' i ii j k m n o oo p s t w y z

The consonant clusters that occur in many Ojibwe dialects are represented with the following sequences of characters:

mb, nd, ng, nj, nz, ns, nzh, sk, shp, sht, shk

The consonant cluster ⟨nw⟩ represents syllable onset [n] followed by a syllable medial [w], while the rare consonant cluster ⟨n'w⟩ represents a nasaled vowel followed by ⟨w⟩; in some varieties of Southwestern Ojibwe, the rare nasaled vowel followed by a glottal stop is represented with ⟨n'⟩, in words such as niiyawen'enh "my namesake" and aan'aan'we "pintail duck".

===== Ottawa-Eastern Ojibwe double vowel system =====
A minor variant of the double vowel system is used to write the Ottawa and Eastern Ojibwe varieties spoken in Michigan and southwestern Ontario, as exemplified in a prominent dictionary. Other publications making use of the same system include a reference grammar and a collection of texts dictated by an Ottawa speaker from Walpole Island First Nation, Ontario.

The two dialects are characterized by loss of short vowels because of vowel syncope. Since vowel syncope occurs frequently in the Ottawa and Eastern Ojibwe dialects, additional consonant clusters arise.

The letter h is used for the glottal stop [ʔ], which is represented in the broader Ojibwe version with the apostrophe. In Ottawa, the apostrophe is reserved for a separate function, as noted below. In a few primarily expressive words, orthographic h has the phonetic value [h]: aa haaw "OK".

The apostrophe ’ is used to distinguish primary (underlying) consonant clusters from secondary clusters that arise when the rule of syncope deletes a vowel between two consonants. For example, orthographic ng must be distinguished from n'g. The former has the phonetic value [ŋ] (arising from place of articulation assimilation of /n/ to the following velar consonant /ɡ/, which is then deleted in word-final position as in mnising [mnɪsɪŋ] "at the island"), and the latter has the phonetic value [ŋɡ] as in san'goo [saŋɡoː] "black squirrel".

Labialized stop consonants [ɡʷ] and [kʷ], consisting of a consonant with noticeable lip rounding, occur in the speech of some speakers. Labialization is not normally indicated in writing, but a subscript dot is used in a dictionary of Ottawa and Eastern Ojibwe to mark labialization: g̣taaji "he is afraid" and aaḳzi "he is sick".

The Ottawa-Eastern Ojibwe variant of the Double vowel system treats the digraphs sh, zh, ch as two separate letters for purposes of alphabetization. Consequently, the alphabetical order is:

a b c d e g (g̣) h (ḥ) i j k (ḳ) m n o p s t w y z

==== Cree-Saulteaux Roman system ====
The Cree-Saulteaux Roman system, also known as the Cree Standard Roman Orthography (Cree SRO), is based on the Canadian Aboriginal syllabics and is found in northern Ontario, southern Manitoba and southern Saskatchewan. Compared to the Fiero or Rhodes double vowel systems, long vowels, including ⟨e⟩, are shown with either macron or circumflex diacritic marks, depending on the community's standards. Though syncope is not a common feature with Saulteaux, the occasional vowel loss is indicated with a ⟨'⟩ Nasaled vowels are generally not marked. The resulting alphabetical order is:

' a â c ê h i î k m n o ô p s š t w y

==== Northern Ojibwe system ====
Although speakers of the dialects of Ojibwe spoken in northern Ontario most commonly write using the syllabary, an alphabetic system is also employed. This system is similar to the Cree-Saulteaux Roman system, the most notable difference being the substitution of conventional letters of the alphabet for symbols taken from the International Phonetic Alphabet, which results in the use of ⟨sh⟩ instead of ⟨š⟩ and the use of double vowels to represent long vowels.

This system is used in several pedagogical grammars for the Severn Ojibwe dialect, a translation of the New Testament in both the Severn Ojibwe and the Berens River dialects, and a text collection in the Northwestern Ojibwe dialect.

The short vowels are: i, o, a

Short vowels
Sound	Phonetic	Ojibwe examples	Gloss	English equivalent
i	[ɪ]	ihkwe nihka paaki	'woman' 'Canada goose' 'shouts'	sit
o	[o] ~ [ʊ]	onapi inkoci tako	'sits up' 'somewhere' 'together with'	put
a	[ɑ] ~ [ʌ]	ahki kaye ekwa	'land, moss' 'and, also' 'and, so'	but

The long vowels are: ii, oo, aa, e

Long vowels
Sound	Phonetic	Ojibwe examples	Gloss	English equivalent
ii	[iː]	iitok niin mii	'supposedly' 'I, me' 'so, it is'	seat
oo	[oː] ~ [uː]	oocii kinooshe pimipahtoo	'fly' 'fish' 'runs by'	boat, boot
aa	[aː]	aapihta maawiin kemaa	'half' 'probably' 'maybe'	father
e	[eː]	eshkan pehkaac piinte	'horn, antler' 'hold on!' 'is inside'	bed

The consonants are:

p, c, h, k, m, n, s, sh, t, y, w

The letter ⟨c⟩ is used to represent the postalveolar affricate /tʃ/; the digraph ⟨sh⟩ is used to represent the postalveolar fricative /ʃ/.

The lenis consonants are:

p, c, k, s, sh, t

Consonant examples
Sound	Phonetic	Ojibwe examples	Gloss	English equivalent
p	[p] ~ [b]	pine nipi ahsap	'partridge' 'water' 'net'	pit, spit
t	[t] ~ [d]	tepwe acitamoo kekaat	'really' 'squirrel' 'nearly'	time, dime
c	[tʃ] ~ [dʒ]	ciimaan aahpici kiimooc	'canoe' 'very' 'secretly'	chip, judge
k	[k] ~ [ɡ]	kiin waakohsh kotak	'you' 'fox' 'other'	keep, game
s	[s] ~ [z]	saakahikan misiwe ninsekis	'lake' 'everywhere' 'I am afraid'	sit, zip
sh	[ʃ] ~ [ʒ]	shemaak peshik tawash	'right away' 'one' 'more'	ship, measure
m	[m]	miskwi ohomaa saakaham	'blood' 'here' 'goes out'	man
n	[n]	naabe pine waawan	'man' 'partridge' 'egg'	name
w	[w]	waahsa kaawin ahaaw	'far' 'no' 'okay'	win
y	[j]	keyaapic sanaskway	'still' 'leech'	yes
h	[h]	ohowe	'this'	him

Consonant clusters of h followed by a lenis consonant correspond to fortis consonants in other dialects:

hp, hc, hk, hs, hsh, ht

The consonant clusters that occur in Ojibwe dialects that use the Northern orthography are represented with the following sequences of characters:

mp, nt, nc, nk, ns, nhs, nsh, sk, shp, sht, shk

==== Algonquin Roman system ====
Unlike the other Roman systems modeled after English, the Algonquin Roman system is instead modeled after French. Its most striking features are the use of either circumflex or grave diacritic mark over the long vowels, /tʃ/ and /dʒ/ written as ⟨tc⟩ and ⟨dj⟩, and /ʃ/ and /ʒ/ are written as ⟨c⟩ and ⟨j⟩. However, in the Maniwaki dialect of Algonquin, /tʃ/ is written as ⟨ch⟩ and /ʃ/ is written as ⟨sh⟩.

==== Correspondence chart of the popular Roman systems ====
The n-dash (–) is used to mark where no equivalent is found. Also, ⟨v⟩ is used as a generic vowel indicator.

Fiero Double vowel system	Ottawa-Eastern Ojibwe Double vowel system	Northern Ojibwe system	Saulteaux system	Bloomfield-Voorhis Saulteaux system	Algonquin system	IPA Value
–	'	'	'	–	–	–
a	a	a	a	a	a	ə
a	a	a	a	ą	a	ɔ
aa	aa	aa	ā / â	á	â / à	aː
aa	aa	aa	ā / â	ą́	â / à	ɔː
b	b	p	p	p	b	b
ch	ch	hc	hc	cc	tc	tʃ
d	d	t	t	t	d	d
e	e	e	ē / ê	é	ê / è	eː
g	g	k	k	k	g	ɡ
gw	gw / g̣	kw	kw	kw	gw	ɡw
h	h	h	h	h	h	h
'	h	h	h	h	h	ʔ
'w / w	hw / ḥ	hw	hw	hw	w	ʔw
i	i	i	i	i	i	ɪ
ii	ii	ii	ī / î	í	î / ì	iː
j	j	c	c	c	dj	dʒ
k	k	hk	hk	kk	k	k
kw	kw / ḳ	hkw	hkw	kkw	kw	kw
m	m	m	m	m	m	m
mb	mb	mp	mp	mp	mb	mb
n	n	n	n	n	n	n
nd	nd	nt	nt	nt	nd	nd
ng	ng	nk	nk	nk	ng	ŋ(ɡ)
n'	nh	–	–	–	–	ṽʔ
nj	nj	nc	nc	nc	ndj	ndʒ
ns	ns	nhs	nhs	nss	ns	ṽs
ny / -nh	ny / -nh	y / –	–	–	–	ṽj / ṽ
nz	nz	ns	ns	ns	nz	ṽz
nzh	nzh	nsh	nš	nš	nj	ṽʒ
o	o	o	o	o	o	o / ʊ
oo	oo	oo	ō / ô	ó	ô / ò	oː / uː
p	p	hp	hp	pp	p	p
s	s	hs	hs	ss	s	s
sh	sh	hsh	hš	šš	c	ʃ
shk	shk	shk	šk	šk	ck	ʃk
shp	shp	shp	šp	šp	cp	ʃp
sht	sht	sht	št	št	ct	ʃt
sk	sk	sk	sk	sk	sk	sk
t	t	ht	ht	tt	t	t
w	w	w	w	w	w	w
y	y	y	y	y	y	j
z	z	s	s	s	z	z
zh	zh	sh	š	š	j	ʒ

==== Folk spelling ====
Folk spelling of Anishinaabemowin is not a system per se, as it varies from person to person writing speech into script. Each writer employing folk spelling would write out the word as how the speaker themself would form the words. Depending on whether the reference sound representation is based on English or French, a word may be represented using common reference language sound representation, thus better able to reflect the vowel or consonant value. However, since that requires the knowledge of how the speaker themself speaks, folk spelling quickly becomes difficult to read for those individuals not familiar with the writer.

Folk spellings continue to be widely used and, in some cases, are preferred to more systematic or analytical orthographies. Prominent Ottawa author Basil Johnston has explicitly rejected it, preferring to use a form of folk spelling in which the correspondences between sounds and letters are less systematic. Similarly, a lexicon representing Ottawa as spoken in Michigan and another based on Ottawa in Oklahoma use English-based folk spelling distinct from that employed by Johnston.

=== Historical Roman orthographies ===
==== Evans system ====
James Evans, a missionary from Kingston upon Hull, UK, had prepared the Speller and Interpreter in English and Indian. in 1837, but was unable to get its printing sanctioned by the British and Foreign Bible Society. Evans continued to use his Ojibwe writing system in his work in Ontario. However, his students appear to have had conceptual difficulties working with the same alphabet for two different languages with very different sounds. Furthermore, the structure of the Ojibwe language made most words quite long when spelled with Latin letters, and Evans himself found this approach awkward. His book also noted differences in the Ojibwe dialectal field. The "default" dialect was the Ojibwemowin spoken at Rice Lake, Ontario (marked as "RL"). The other two were Credit, Ontario, (marked as "C") and areas to the west (marked as "W").

The Evans system recognized short and long vowels but did not distinguish between lenis and fortis consonants. Another distinct character was the use of ⟨e⟩ and ⟨o⟩ to serve as both a consonant and vowel. As a vowel, it served as /i/ and /o/, but as a consonant, it served as /j/ and /w/. Evans distinguished long vowels from short vowels by doubling the short vowel value. He also used three diacritics to aid the reader in pronunciation. He used a macron (¯) over a vowel or vowels to represent nasals (/Ṽ/) and diaereses (¨) over the vowel to indicate a glottal stop (/ʔ/); if the glottal stop was final, he duplicated the vowel and put a circumflex (ˆ) over the duplicated vowel. "Gladness," for example, was written as buubenandumooen (baapinendamowin in the Fiero system).

Evans eventually abandoned his Ojibwe writing system and formulated what would eventually become the Canadian Aboriginal syllabics. His Ojibwe syllabics parsing order was based on his Romanized Ojibwe.

Evans system	a	aa	b	d	e	ee	g	j	m	n	o	oo	u	uu	z	s
Fiero system	e /ɛː/	e /eː/	b \ p	d \ t	i \ y	ii \ iy	g \ k	j \ ch	m	n	o \ w	oo \ ow	a	aa	z \ s	zh \ sh

Evans system	V̄	V̄V̄	VV̈	VV̂	VhV
Fiero system	Vn	VVny/VVnh	V'V	V'	VhV

==== Baraga system ====
Bishop Frederic Baraga, in his years as a missionary to the Ojibwa and the Odawa, became the foremost grammarian of Anishinaabemowin during the latter half of the 19th century.

His work A Dictionary of the Otchipwe Language, explained in English is still considered the best reference regarding the Ojibwe vocabulary of western Upper Peninsula of Michigan and northern Wisconsin. In his dictionary, grammar books, and prayer book, the sound representations of Ojibwe are shown in the table below. There has also been discussion regarding if Baraga represented nasals. In his earlier editions of the dictionary, circumflex accents were used to indicate nasals (-nh / -ny-) but in his later editions, they appear instead to represent long vowels or stressed vowels, believed to be changed by the editor of his dictionary. Baraga represented pronominal prefixes separate from the word but indicated preverbs attached with a hyphen to the main word. End-of-line word breaks not at the preverb hyphen were written with a hyphen at the end of the line, followed by another hyphen at the beginning of the next line.

Baraga system	◌	a	â	b	d	dj	e \ é \ ê	g	h	i	j	k \ kk	m	n	◌	o	ô	p	s	sh	ss	t	tch	w	◌-◌	◌- | -◌
Fiero system	'	a	a \ aa	b	d	j	e	g	' \ h	i \ ii \ y	zh	k \ g-	m	n	n(-h \ -y-)	o/oo	oo	p \ b-	z	sh	s	t \ d-	ch	w	◌-◌	◌= | ◌

==== Algonquin systems ====
Jean-André Cuoq was a missionary to the Algonquin and the Iroquois. He wrote several grammar books, hymnals, a catechism, and his premier work, Lexique de la Langue Algonquine in 1886, focusing on the form of Anishinaabemowin spoken among the southern Algonquins. His published works regarding the Algonquin language used basic sounds, without differentiating vowel lengths, but, unlike earlier works by Malhiot, he differentiated consonant strengths. Additionally, unlike Baraga, Cuoq further broke words down to their root forms and clarified ambiguously defined words found in Baraga's dictionary.

Malhiot system	◌		ᴀ		c		e	i			ᴋ		ʍ	◌C	ʌ	◌C	◌ \ ◌V	o		p		s		t		tc		◌	ȣ
Cuoq system	◌	h	a	a (à) (Note: long vowel generally not distinguished unless explicitly marked as ⟨à⟩, ⟨ì⟩, or ⟨ò⟩)	c	j	e	i	i (ì)	i (ï) (Note: semivowel generally not distinguished unless explicitly marked as ⟨ï⟩)	k	g	m	mC	n	nC	nh \ nhiV	o	o (ò)	p	b	s	z	t	d	tc	dj	v	w
Fiero system	'	-' \ h	a	aa	sh \ zh-	zh	e	i	ii	y	k \ g-	g	m	mC	n	nC	nh \ nyV	o	oo	p \ b-	b	s \ z-	z	t \ d-	d	ch \ j-	j	◌ \ : \ * \ w (Note: variable element, reflected in certain vowels being lengthened (:) or its quality changed (*) or have ⟨w⟩ appear in certain forms (such as in the case typical of the -Cw and -Caw Stem verbs))	w

In later works using the Cuoq system, such as Dictionnaire Français-Algonquin by George Lemoine, long vowels were indicated by a circumflex ⟨ˆ⟩ placed over the vowel, while the unstressed short vowels were indicated by a diaeresis ⟨¨⟩ placed over the vowel. As a relic to an older Malhiot system, upon which the Cuoq system is based, ⟨w⟩ of the Cuoq system can also be found as ⟨ȣ⟩ (or the substitute ⟨8⟩).

== Ojibwe syllabics ==
See Canadian Aboriginal syllabics for a more in-depth discussion of Ojibwe syllabics and related scripts.

Ojibwe is also written in a non-alphabetic orthography, often called syllabics. Wesleyan clergyman James Evans devised the syllabary in 1840–1841 while serving as a missionary among speakers of Swampy Cree in Norway House in Rupert's Land (now northern Manitoba). Influences on Evans's creation of the syllabary included his prior experience with devising an alphabetic orthography for Eastern Ojibwe, his awareness of the syllabary devised for Cherokee, and his familiarity with Pitman shorthand, and Devanagari scripts.

The syllabary spread rapidly among speakers of Cree and Ojibwe and is now widely used by literate Ojibwe speakers in northern Ontario and Manitoba, with most other Ojibwe groups using alphabetically based orthographies, as discussed above.

The syllabary is conventionally presented in a chart, but different renditions may present varying amounts of detail.

Ojibwe syllabics, shown both fortis-lenis equivalents with Eastern A-position and I-position Finals and pre-glyph W.
Initial	Vowel							Final (terminal)		Final (internal)	
Initial	e	i	o	a	ii	oo	aa	a-pos.	i-pos.	a-pos.	i-pos.
' / (none)-	ᐁ	ᐃ	ᐅ	ᐊ	ᐄ	ᐆ	ᐋ	ᐊ	ᐊᐞ	ᐊᐊ, ᐊᐦᐊ	ᐊᐊ, ᐊᐦᐊ, ᐊᐞᐊ
p / b-	ᐯ	ᐱ	ᐳ	ᐸ	ᐲ	ᐴ	ᐹ	ᐊᑉ	ᐊᣔ		
t / d-	ᑌ	ᑎ	ᑐ	ᑕ	ᑏ	ᑑ	ᑖ	ᐊᑦ	ᐊᣕ		
k / g-	ᑫ	ᑭ	ᑯ	ᑲ	ᑮ	ᑰ	ᑳ	ᐊᒃ	ᐊᣖ		
ch / j-	ᒉ	ᒋ	ᒍ	ᒐ	ᒌ	ᒎ	ᒑ	ᐊᒡ	ᐊᣗ		
m-	ᒣ	ᒥ	ᒧ	ᒪ	ᒦ	ᒨ	ᒫ	ᐊᒻ	ᐊᣘ	ᐊᒻᐊ	ᐊᣘᐊ
n-	ᓀ	ᓂ	ᓄ	ᓇ	ᓃ	ᓅ	ᓈ	ᐊᓐ	ᐊᣙ	ᐊᓐᐊ	ᐊᣙᐊ
s / z-	ᓭ	ᓯ	ᓱ	ᓴ	ᓰ	ᓲ	ᓵ	ᐊᔅ	ᐊᣚ	ᐊᔅᐊ	ᐊᣚᐊ
sh / zh-	ᔐ	ᔑ	ᔓ	ᔕ	ᔒ	ᔔ	ᔖ	ᐊᔥ	ᐊᣛ	ᐊᔥᐊ	ᐊᣛᐊ
y-	ᔦ	ᔨ	ᔪ	ᔭ	ᔩ	ᔫ	ᔮ	ᐊᔾ	ᐊ^{ᐤ}, ᐊᐃ		
w-	ᐧᐁ	ᐧᐃ	ᐧᐅ	ᐧᐊ	ᐧᐄ	ᐧᐆ	ᐧᐋ	ᐊᐤ	ᐊᐤ,ᐊᣜ		
h-	ᐦᐁ	ᐦᐃ	ᐦᐅ	ᐦᐊ	ᐦᐄ	ᐦᐆ	ᐦᐋ	ᐊᐦ	ᐊᐦ	ᐊᐦᐊ	ᐊᐦᐊ

The syllabary consists of (a) characters that represent a syllable consisting of a vowel without any preceding consonantal onset, written with a triangle rotated through four positions to represent the vowel qualities /e, i, o, a/; (b) characters that represent consonant-vowel syllables for the consonants /p t k tʃ m n s ʃ j/ combined with the four vowel qualities; (c) characters called finals that represent syllable-closing consonants both word-finally and word-internally; and (d) modifier characters for /h/ and /w/.

The characters representing combinations of consonant plus vowel are rotated through four orientations, each representing one of the four primary vowels, /e i o a/. The syllabic characters are conventionally presented in a chart (see above) with characters organized into rows representing the value of the syllable onset and the columns representing vowel quality.

A glottal stop or /h/ preceding a vowel is optionally written with a separate character ⟨ᐦ⟩, as in ᐱᒪᑕᐦᐁ pimaatahe 'is skating'.

The syllable-closing characters referred to as finals (called "terminations" by Evans, with "final" being a later terminological innovation), occur in both word-final, and, less frequently, word-internal positions. The finals are generally superscripted, but originally were printed or handwritten mid-line. There are two distinct sets of finals in use, a Western set and an Eastern set. The Western finals are accent-like in appearance and are unrelated to the other characters. The Eastern finals occur in four different forms. The more common form, the a-position finals, uses smaller versions of the characters for syllables containing the vowel /a/; the less common i-position sets use either smaller versions of the characters for syllables containing the vowel /i/ or their full height forms. Use of the i-position series is common in some communities particularly in handwriting. The least common are those who use a mixture of a-position, i-position, and o-position series in their smaller version as finals, dependent on the word root. The Western finals were introduced in the earliest version of the syllabary and the Eastern finals were introduced in the 1860s.

The examples in the table are cited from Neskantaga, Ontario (Lansdowne House), a community assigned to the Northwestern Ojibwe dialect.

Western and Eastern a-position finals
Sound	Western	Eastern	Roman equivalent	English gloss
p	ᑊ ᐊᓴᑊ (ᐊᐦᓴᑊ)	ᑉ ᐊᓴᑉ (ᐊᐦᓴᑉ)	ahsap (asab)	'net'
t	ᐟ ᑫᑲᐟ (ᑫᑳᐟ)	ᑦ ᑫᑲᑦ (ᑫᑳᑦ)	kekaat (gegaad)	'nearly'
k	ᐠ ᒥᑎᐠ (ᒥᐦᑎᐠ)	ᒃ ᒥᑎᒃ (ᒥᐦᑎᒃ)	mihtik (mitig)	'tree, stick'
c /tʃ/	ᐨ ᑭᒧᐨ (ᑮᒨᐨ)	ᒡ ᑭᒧᒡ (ᑮᒨᒡ)	kiimooc (giimooj)	'secretly'
s	ᐢ ᓂᑯᓯᐢ (ᓂᐣᑯᓯᐦᐢ)	ᔅ ᓂᑯᓯᔅ (ᓂᓐᑯᓯᐦᔅ)	ninkosihs (ningozis)	'my son'
sh /ʃ/	ᐡ ᐱᐡ (ᐲᐡ)	ᔥ ᐱᔥ (ᐲᔥ)	piish (biizh)	'bring him!'
m	ᒼ ᐊᑭᒼ (ᐋᑭᒼ)	ᒻ ᐊᑭᒻ (ᐋᑭᒻ)	aakim (aagim)	'snowshoe'
n	ᐣ ᒪᑭᓯᐣ (ᒪᐦᑭᓯᐣ)	ᓐ ᒪᑭᓯᓐ (ᒪᐦᑭᓯᓐ)	mahkisin (makizin)	'shoe'
y	˙ ᐊᔕ˙ (ᐋᔕ˙)	ᔾ ᐊᔕᔾ (ᐋᔕᔾ)	aashay (aazhay)	'now, then'
w	ᐤ ᐱᔑᐤ (ᐱᔑᐤ)	ᐤ ᐱᔑᐤ (ᐱᔑᐤ)	pishiw (bizhiw)	'bobcat'

The sound /w/ is represented by adding a diacritic ⟨ ᐧ ⟩, sometimes called the 'w-dot', to a triangle or consonant-vowel character. Several different patterns of use occur related to the use of western or eastern finals: (a) Western, w-dot added after the character it modifies, with western finals; (b) Eastern, w-dot added before the character it modifies, with eastern finals; (c) Northern, w-dot added before the character it modifies, with western finals.

Position of w-dot
Western	Northern	Eastern a-position	Eastern i-position	Roman equivalent	English gloss
ᐃᐧᐦᓯᓂᐣ	ᐧᐃᐦᓯᓂᐣ	ᐧᐃᐦᓯᓂᓐ	ᐧᐃᐦᓯᓂᣙ	wiihsinin	'eat!'

Vowel length is phonologically contrastive in Ojibwe but is frequently not indicated by syllabics writers; for example, the words aakim 'snowshoe' and akim 'count him, them!' may both be written ᐊᑭᑦ. Vowel length is optionally indicated by placing a dot above the character, with the exception of /eː/, for which there is no corresponding short vowel and, therefore, no need to indicate length. The practice of indicating vowel length is called 'pointed syllabics' or 'pointing'. In the pointed variant, the word 'snowshoe' would be written ᐋᑭᑦ.

The fortis consonants are generally not distinguished in the common unpointed writing from the lenis ones and so both /d/ t and /t/ ht are written t, etc. However, some speakers place the h initial before another initial to indicate that that initial is fortis rather than lenis.

The h initial and final are also used to represent the glottal stop in most communities, but in some, ⟨ᐞ⟩(superscript i) is used as a glottal-stop letter.

Not shown in the sample table are the characters representing non-Ojibwe sounds f th l r. All syllabics-using Ojibwe communities use p with an internal ring to represent f, typically ᕓ, ᕕ, ᕗ, ᕙ and ᕝ, and most use t with an internal ring to represent th, typically ᕞ, ᕠ, ᕤ, ᕦ and ᕪ, but variations do exist on the placement of the internal ring; in some communities where the s have transitioned to th, ᑌᐦ, ᑎᐦ, ᑐᐦ, ᑕᐦ and ᐟᐦ sequence is instead found. However, the method of representing l and r varies much greatly across the communities using Ojibwe syllabics.

The syllabics-using communities can be classified into:

- Finals use
  - Eastern A-position Finals—consonant in a-direction shown as a superscript; most common finals in use
  - Eastern I-position Finals—consonant in i-direction shown as a superscript; used in some communities of Ontario and Quebec
  - Eastern I-Series as Finals—consonant in i-direction shown in full-size; used in some communities of Ontario and Manitoba
  - Eastern Mixed Finals—consonant in i-, o- or a-direction shown as a superscript with choice dependent upon the word's root; typically found in James Bay Cree influenced communities
  - Western Finals—typically found in Saulteaux and Oji-cree(ᑊ ''p'', ᐟ ''t'', ᐠ ''k'', ᐨ ''ch'', ᒼ ''m'', ᐣ ''n'', ᐢ ''s'', ᐡ ''sh'' and ᕀ ''y'')
- W-dot positioning
  - pre-glyph—most commonly associated with Eastern and Northern communities (ᐌ)
  - post-glyph—most commonly associated with Western communities (ᐍ)
- L/R representation
  - independent Sigma form—shaped like Greek capital letter sigma (ᓬ for l and ᕒ for r).
  - nesting Sigma form—similar to above, but nesting on the N-shape with superscripted sigma-form alone as finals
  - N-shape modified form—most common form, created by an erasure of part of the N-form (ᓓ ᓕ ᓗ ᓚ ᓪ for l and ᕃ ᕆ ᕈ ᕋ ᕐ for r)
  - Roman Catholic form—most often found in western communities (ᕃ ᕆ ᕊ ᕍ ᔆ for l and ᖊ ᖋ ᖌ ᖍ ᙆ for r)

There is also an obsolete set of syllabics in the Unicode standard representing šp-series, or the sp-series in those communities where š have merged with s. This obsolete set has been replaced in current use.

	e	i	o	a
šp/sp-	𑪼	𑪽	𑪾	𑪿
šp-	ᔥᐯ	ᔥᐱ	ᔥᐳ	ᔥᐸ
šp-	ᐡᐯ	ᐡᐱ	ᐡᐳ	ᐡᐸ
sp-	ᐢᐯ	ᐢᐱ	ᐢᐳ	ᐢᐸ

Alternative y ⟨ᣟ⟩ (superscripted w-dot) or ⟨ᣞ⟩ (superscripted w-ring), depending on if a medial or a final respectively, in words where w has transformed into y. In Evans' design, the y-dot was part of the original syllabics set, but due to ease of confusion between it and the w-dot in handwritten documents, most communities abandoned the y-dot in favour of the y-cross ⟨ᕀ⟩, which is still being used among communities using Western Finals. In Moose Cree-influenced communities, the superscripted ring can also be found as a ring diacritic in words such as ᐊᐦᐸᢹ (apakway, 'cattail') instead of ᐊᐦᐸᑾᣞ or ᐊᐦᐸᑾᔾ.

== Great Lakes Algonquian syllabary ==
The Great Lakes Algonquian syllabary is a syllabic writing system based upon the French alphabet, with letters organized into syllables. It was used primarily by speakers of Fox, Potawatomi, and Winnebago, but there is indirect evidence of use by speakers of Southwestern Ojibwe ("Chippewa").

It has been suggested that Ottawa speakers were among the groups that used the syllabary, but supporting evidence is weak.

== See also ==
- Ojibwe language
