= Dora Steel Schexnider Young =

Chief of the Sac and Fox Nation
- In office 1973–1975

Personal details
- Born: Dora Steel Corker; January 22, 1939 Claremore, Oklahoma, United States
- Died: December 25, 2017 (aged 78) Stroud, Oklahoma, United States
- Citizenship: American; Sac and Fox Nation

Dora Steel Schexnider Young (January 22, 1939 – December 25, 2017) was a Sac and Fox politician who served as the first woman elected chief of the Sac and Fox Nation from 1973 to 1975.

== Biography ==
Dora Steel Schexnider Young was born on January 22, 1939, in Claremore, Oklahoma, to Thomas Coker Sr. and Frances Walker Coker. A member of the Sac and Fox Nation, she was elected to the tribe's business committee in the 1970s. On August 25, 1973, she was elected the first woman chief of the Sac and Fox Nation by a 67 vote margin. She lost reelection in 1975, but was elected secretary-treasurer in 1976 and held that office until 1980. She was briefly reelected in 1995 for a short term. She died on December 25, 2017, in Stroud, Oklahoma.
