= Eagle Clan =

Eagle Clan is a term used by several indigenous North American tribes.

- The Laxsgiik, or Eagle clan (phratry) in the Tsimshian, Gitksan, Nisga'a, and Haida nations in the regions now called British Columbia and southeast Alaska.
- One of the twelve clans in the Ho-Chunk or Winnebago tribes, in the area now called Wisconsin.
- A term in the Sauk language, according to wikt:ketiwa and
- An Anishinaabe (or Ojibwe, Odawa, Potawatomi)) term, "Migizi Dodem", according to
- Eagle Clan Lokono-Arawaks in the Caribbean region ()
