= Potawatomi language =

Central Algonquian language

Potawatomi
- bodwéwadmimwen
- Native to: United States, Canada
- Region: Michigan, Oklahoma, Indiana, Wisconsin, Kansas, and southern Ontario, formerly Northeastern Illinois
- Ethnicity: Potawatomi
- Native speakers: <10 (2015); 5 (2018)
- Revival: 2010s
- Language family: Algic: Algonquian; Ojibwe–Potawatomi; Potawatomi
- Writing system: Latin (various alphabets), Great Lakes Algonquian syllabics

Language codes
- ISO 639-3: pot
- Glottolog: pota1247
- ELP: Potawatomi
- Linguasphere: 62-ADA-dc
- Potawatomi

- Potawatomi is classified as Critically Endangered by the UNESCO Atlas of the World's Languages in Danger.

- Person: Bodéwadmi (Neshnabé)
- People: Bodéwadmik (Neshnabék)
- Language: Bodwéwadmimwen (Neshnabémwen)

Potawatomi (/ˌpɒtəˈwɒtəmi/, also spelled Pottawatomie; in Potawatomi Bodwéwadmimwen, Bodwéwadmi Zheshmowen, or Neshnabémwen) is a Central Algonquian language. It was historically spoken by the Potawatomi people who lived around the Great Lakes in what are now Michigan and Wisconsin in the United States, and in southern Ontario in Canada. Federally recognized tribes in Michigan and Oklahoma are working to revive the language.

== Classification ==
Potawatomi is a member of the Algonquian language family (itself a member of the larger Algic stock). It is usually classified as a Central Algonquian language, with languages such as Ojibwe, Cree, Menominee, Miami–Illinois, Shawnee and Fox. The label Central Algonquian signifies a geographic grouping rather than the group of languages descended from a common ancestor language within the Algonquian family. Of the Central languages, Potawatomi is most similar to Ojibwe, but it also has borrowed a considerable amount of vocabulary from the Sauk.

Generally, in developments since Indian Removal in the 19th century, Potawatomi has become differentiated in North America among separated populations. It is divided between Northern Potawatomi, spoken in Ontario, Canada; and Michigan and Wisconsin of the United States; and Southern Potawatomi, which is spoken in Kansas and Oklahoma, where certain Potawatomi ancestors were removed who had formerly lived in Illinois and other areas east of the Mississippi River.

== Phonology ==
Here, the phonology of the Northern dialect is described, which differs somewhat from that of the Southern dialect, spoken in Kansas.

There are five vowel phonemes, four diphthongs, and nineteen consonant phonemes.

⟨é⟩, which is often written as ⟨e'⟩, represents an open-mid front unrounded vowel, /ɛ/. ⟨e⟩ represents the schwa, /ə/, which has several allophonic variants. Before /n/, it becomes [ɪ]; before /kː/, /k/, /ʔ/ and word-finally, it becomes [ʌ].

⟨o⟩ is pronounced /u/ in Michigan and /o/ elsewhere. When it is in a closed syllable, it is pronounced [ʊ]. There are also four diphthongs, /ɛj ɛw əj əw/, spelled ⟨éy éw ey ew⟩. Phonemic /əj əw/ are realized as [ɪj ʌw].

Obstruents, as in many other Algonquian languages, do not have a voicing distinction per se but what is better termed a "strong"/"weak" distinction. "Strong" consonants, written as voiceless (⟨p t k kw⟩), are always voiceless, often aspirated, and longer in duration than the "weak" consonants, which are written as voiced (⟨b d g gw⟩) and are often voiced and are not aspirated. Nasals before another consonant become syllabic, and /tː/, /t/, and /n/ are dental: [t̪ː t̪ n̪].

=== Vowels ===
	Front	Back
High	i	o
Mid	ə	
Low	ɛ	a

=== Consonants ===
	Bilabial	Dental	Palatal	Velar		Glottal
	Bilabial	Dental	Palatal	plain	labial	Glottal
Occlusive	p	t	tʃ	k	kʷ	ʔ
Occlusive	pː	tː	tʃː	kː	kːʷ	
Fricative		s	ʃ			h
Fricative		sː	ʃː			
Sonorant	m	n	j		w	

Lenis type consonants can frequently be voiced in various surroundings as [b d dʒ ɡ ɡʷ] for plosives and affricates, and [z ʒ] for fricatives.

== Writing systems ==
=== Current writing system ===
Though no standard orthography has been agreed upon by the Potawatomi communities, the system most commonly used is the "Pedagogical System" developed by the Wisconsin Native American Languages Program (WNALP). As the name suggests, it was designed to be used in language teaching. The system is based on the Roman alphabet and is phonemic, with each letter or digraph representing a contrastive sound. The letters used are a b ch d e é g ' h i j k m n o p s sh t w y z zh.

In Kansas, a different system called BWAKA is used. It too is both based on the Roman alphabet and phonemic, with each letter or digraph representing a contrastive sound. The letters used are ' a b c d e e' g h i I j k m n o p s sh t u w y z zh.

=== Traditional system ===
The traditional system used in writing Potawatomi is a form of syllabic writing. Potawatomi, Odawa, Sauk, Meskwaki and Ho-Chunk communities all used it. Derived from the Roman alphabet, it resembles handwritten Roman text. However, unlike the Unified Canadian Aboriginal Syllabics or the Cherokee alphabet, it has not yet been incorporated into the Unicode standards.

Each Potawatomi syllabic block in the system has at least two of the seventeen alphabetic letters, which consist of thirteen consonants and four vowels. Of the thirteen phonemic consonantal letters, the /h/, written ⟨A⟩, is optional.

Consonants
Traditional System	Pedagogical System
l	b/p
(lA)	(p)
t	d/t
(tA)	(t)
tt	j/ch
(ttA)	(ch)
ĸ	g/k
(ĸA)	(k)
s	z/s
(sA)	s
sH	zh/sh
(sHA)	(sh)
m	m
n	n
q	gw/kw
(qA)	(kw)
g	g of "-ng"
w	w
y	y
(none)	'/h
(A)	(h)

Vowels
Traditional System	Pedagogical System
a	a
e	e (ë) (ê)
e	é (ė)
i	i
o	o

== Morphology ==
Potawatomi has six parts of speech: noun, verb, pronoun, prenoun, preverb, and particle.

=== Pronouns ===
There are two main types of pronoun: personal pronouns and demonstrative pronouns. As nouns and verbs use inflection to describe anaphoric reference, the main use of the free pronouns is for emphasis.

==== Personal pronouns ====
Personal pronouns, because of vowel syncope, resemble those of Odaawaa but structurally resemble more those in the Swampy Cree language:

			Swampy Cree	Ojibwe	Odaawaa	Potawatomi
1st person	singular		nîn	niin	nii	nin
1st person	plural	exclusive	nînanân	niinawind	niinwi	ninan
1st person	plural	inclusive	gînanân	giinawind	giinwi	ginan
2nd person	singular		gîn	giin	gii	gin
2nd person	plural		gînawâ	giinawaa	giinwaa	ginwa
3rd person	singular		wîn	wiin	wii	win
3rd person	plural		wînawâ	wiinawaa	wiinwaa	winwa

=== Verbs ===
Conjugation sample of majit 'to leave'
	Independent	Conjunct
1sg	nmaji	majiyan
2sg	gmaji	majiyen
3sg	maji(wak)	majit
3sg.obv	majin	majinet
1sg.excl	nmajimen	majiyak
1pl.incl	gmajimen	majiygo
2pl	gmajim	majiyék
3pl	majik	majiwat

== Correspondences to Ojibwe ==
The relatively-recent split from Ojibwe makes Potawatomi still exhibit strong correspondences, especially with the Odaawaa (Ottawa) dialect.

Fiero Double Vowel System	Rhodes Double Vowel System	Potawatomi WNALP System	Potawatomi BWAKA System	IPA Value
a (unstressed)	(none)	(none)	(none)/u	∅
a (stressed)	a (stressed)	e (ë)	e/u	ə
aa	aa	a	a/o	a~ʌ
b	b	b	b/p	b
ch	ch	ch	c	tʃ
d	d	d	d/t	d
e (secondary stress)	e (secondary stress)	e (ė)	e	ə
e (primary stress)	e (primary stress)	é/e'	e'	ɛ
g	g	g	g/k	ɡ
gi (unstressed)	g	j	j/ch	dʒ
g	g	j (from gy*)	j/c (from gy*)	dʒ
-g	-g	-k	-k	k
h	h	h	h	h
'	h	'	'	ʔ
i (unstressed)	(none)	(none)	(none)/I	∅
i (stressed)	i (stressed)	e	e/I	ə
ii	ii	i	i	ɪ
j	j	j	j/ch	dʒ
k	k	k	k	k
ki (unstressed)	k	ch	c	tʃ
k	k	ch (from ky*)	c (from ky*)	tʃ
m	m	m	m	m
mb	mb	mb	mb	mb
(not from PA *n) n/(none)	n/(none)	n/y	n/y	n~j
(from PA *n) n	n	n	n	n
nd	nd	nd/d	nd/d	nd~d
ng	ng	ng/g	ng/g	ŋɡ~ɡ
nj	nj	nj/j	nj/j	ndʒ~dʒ
ns	ns	s	s	s
nz	nz	z	z	z
ny/-nh	ny/-nh	(none)	(none)	∅
nzh	nzh	zh	zh	ʒ
o (unstressed)	(none)/w/o (unstressed)	(none)/w/o/e	(none)/w/o/e	∅~w~o~ʊ~ə
o (stressed)	o (stressed)	o (ê)	o	o~ʊ
oo	oo	o	o	o
p	p	p	p	p
s	s	s	s	s
sh	sh	sh	sh	ʃ
shk	shk	shk	shk	ʃk
shp	shp	shp	shp	ʃp
sht	sht	sht	sht	ʃt
sk	sk	sk	sk	sk
t	t	t	t	t
w	w/(none)	w/(none)	w/(none)	w~∅
wa (unstressed)	wa (unstressed)/o	w/o	w/o	w~o~ʊ
waa (unstressed)	waa (unstressed)/oo	wa/o	wa/o	wa~o~ʊ
wi (unstressed)	wi (unstressed)/o	w/o	w/o	w~o~ʊ
y	y	y (initial glide)	y (initial glide)	j
(none)	(none)	y (medial glide)	y (medial glide)	j
z	z	z	z/s	z
zh	zh	zh	zh/sh	ʒ

== Language revitalization ==
Cecelia Miksekwe Jackson, one of the last surviving native speakers of Potawatomi, died in May 2011, at the age of 88. She was known for working to preserve and teach the language.

Donald Neaseno Perrot, a native speaker who grew up in the Powers Bluff, Wisconsin, area, has a series of Potawatomi videos, a website, and books available to preserve the language.

The federally recognized Pokégnek Bodéwadmik Pokagon Band of Potawatomi started a master-apprentice program in which a "language student (the language apprentice) will be paired with fluent Potawatomi speakers (the language masters)" in January 2013. In addition, classes in the Potawatomi language are available, including those at the Hannahville summer immersion camp, with webcast instruction and videoconferencing.

There are also free online language courses on Mango Languages from the Pokagon Band of Potawatomi, released in October 2022, and on Memrise from the Citizen Potawatomi Nation in Oklahoma.
