= Sac and Fox Nation =

Native American tribe based in Oklahoma

Total population
- 3,794

Regions with significant populations
- United States (Oklahoma)

Languages
- English, Sauk

Religion
- Drum Society, Native American Church, and Christianity

Related ethnic groups
- other Sauk people, Meskwaki, Kickapoo, and other Algonquian peoples

Sac and Fox Cultural Center in Stroud, 11-2026

The Sac and Fox Nation (Sauk language: Thâkîwaki) is the largest of three federally recognized tribes of the Sauk and Meskwâki (Fox) peoples of American Indians. They are based in central Oklahoma, United States.

Originally from the Lake Huron and Lake Michigan area, they were forcibly relocated to Oklahoma in the 1870s and are predominantly Sauk. The Sac and Fox Oklahoma Tribal Statistical Area (OTSA) is the land base in Oklahoma governed by the tribe.

The two other Sauk and Meskwâki tribes are the Sac and Fox Tribe of the Mississippi in Iowa and the Sac and Fox Nation of Missouri in Kansas and Nebraska. The Sauk and Meskwaki tribes have historically been closely allied, and continue to be in the present day. They speak very similar Algonquian languages, which are sometimes considered to be two dialects of the same language, rather than separate languages.

== Name ==
The Sauk autonym, Thâkîwaki, is also written Thakiwaki, Othâkîwaki, and Sa ki wa ki. It translated as "people coming forth from the water". The term Fox was erroneously applied to the Meskwâki by the United States government during their treaty negotiations.

== Government ==
Map of Sac and Fox Nation's tribal jurisdictional area (OTSA) and nearby jurisdiction areas.

The Sac and Fox Nation is headquartered in Stroud, Oklahoma, and their tribal jurisdictional area covers Lincoln, Payne, and Pottawatomie counties. Their Principal Chief is Audrey R. Lee. A council of five elected officials, each elected for a four-year term, governs the tribe. Elections are held in August in odd-numbered years.

As of 2025, the current administration is:

- Principal Chief: Audrey R. Lee
- Second Chief: Vacant
- Treasurer: Eugenia Tyler-Dawson
- Secretary: Shawna Spoon
- Committee Member: Robert Williamson

Of the 3,794 enrolled tribal citizens in 2011, 2,557 live in Oklahoma. Citizenship in the tribe requires a minimum 1/8 blood quantum, with proven descent to ancestors on recognized rolls.

Sac and Fox casino in Stroud, 11-2026

== Economic development ==
The tribe's housing authority is located in Shawnee, Oklahoma. They issue their own tribal vehicle tags and operate eleven smoke shops and two casinos, the Black Hawk Casino in Shawnee and the Sac and Fox Nation Casino in Stroud. The Stroud casino features the Center Sky Stage, a live entertainment venue.

== History ==
In park area devoted to historical leader Black Hawk, a Sikorsky UH-60 helicopter bearing the ‘Black Hawk’ name.

Sac and Fox park bench referencing Sauk leader Makatai Meshekiakiak, known in English as Black Hawk

The Sac or Thakiwaki lived near Lake Huron and Lake Michigan at the time of European contact. In 1832 they participated in the Black Hawk War against the United States. Military leader Black Hawk remains a cultural hero today. After the war, the tribe relocated several times from Illinois to Iowa, Kansas, and finally Indian Territory in the 1870s.

Their current lands were part of the larger, historical Sac and Fox Reservation of 1867–1891, which was 480,000 acres (1,900 km^{2}) and established by the United States to provide land to the tribes. But by the late 19th century, U.S. policy changed again. Under the Dawes Act of 1887, these tribal land holdings were divided into 160-acre allotments for individual households, intended to encourage the Native Americans to establish subsistence farming according to the European-American cultural ways. Not only did the act not recognize Native American culture, but in many places in this arid land, the allotments were too small to be farmed successfully. Their land was allotted under a June 12, 1890 agreement with the Cherokee Commission. (Individual commissions were set up to manage the allotment of lands of various tribes in Native American Territory.) Land remaining after the allotments was declared "surplus" by the US and sold, primarily to non-Natives. Under the related Curtis Act of 1898, the tribal government and its institutions were dismantled.

The tribe was previously known as the Sac and Fox Tribe of Indians of the Mississippi River. The Sac and Fox tribe had historically occupied large portions of Wisconsin, Iowa, and Missouri, which they gradually ceded to the US by treaties forced by European-American encroachment. By an October 11, 1842 treaty they were removed out of the Midwest to a reservation in Kansas. Noted diplomat Jeffrey Deroine, a formerly enslaved man, served as an interpreter for this treaty.

By 1889 519 of the tribe were located in Indian Territory, what is now central Oklahoma. On June 10, 1890, they ceded these Indian Territory lands to the federal government.

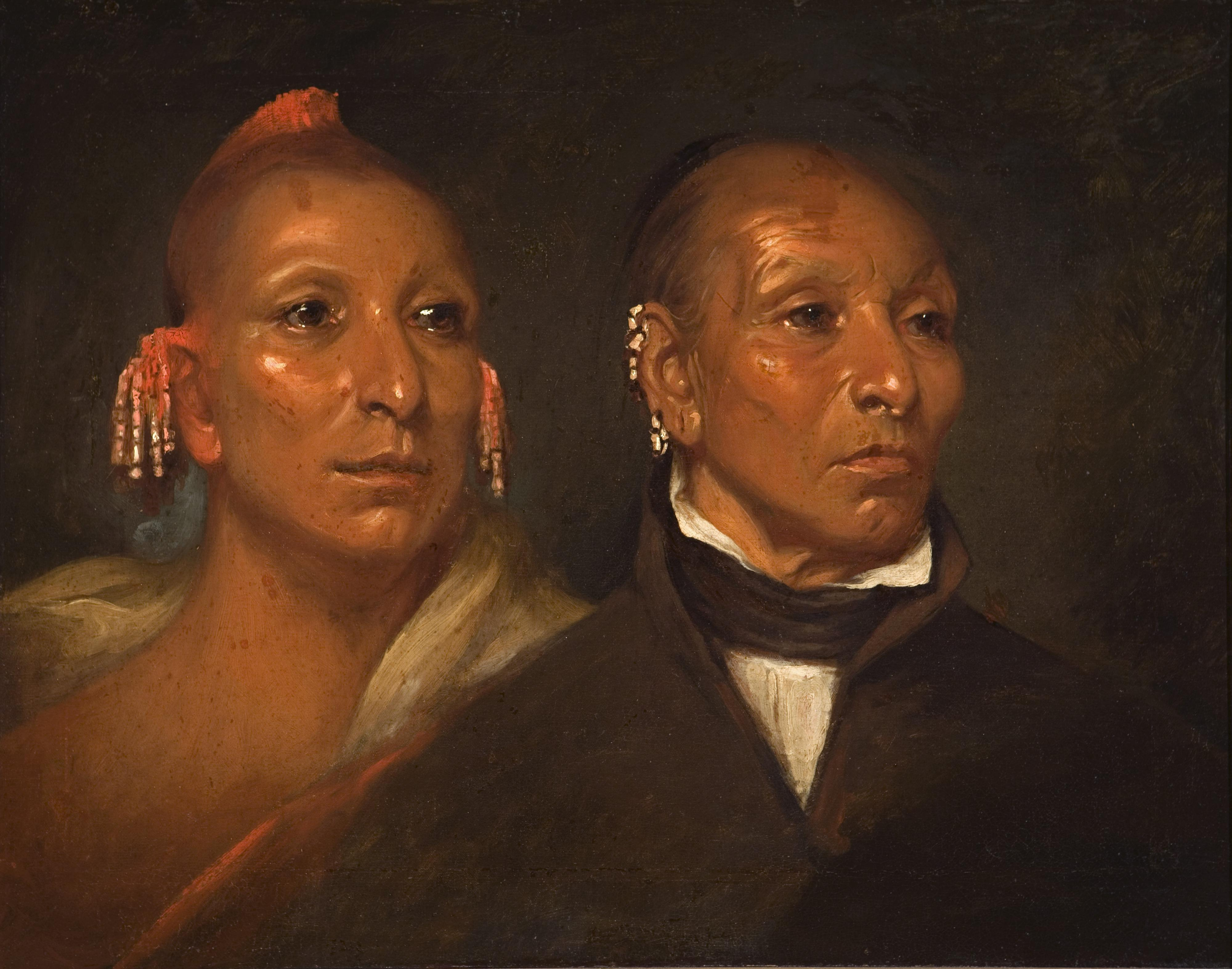
Black Hawk and His Son Whirling Thunder, 1833. Portrait by John Wesley Jarvis. Oil painting in the Gilcrease Museum, Tulsa

=== Self-government re-established in 20th century ===
The administration of President Franklin D. Roosevelt established what was called an "Indian New Deal", passing a law to encourage tribes to re-establish self-government. The Oklahoma Indian Welfare Act of 1934 was passed by its legislature in a similar effort. In 1937, the Sac and Fox organized under these laws and gained federal recognition as a tribe, with an independent relationship to the federal government. They have areas of tribal jurisdiction in Oklahoma, while no longer having a reservation.

Under their constitution, they established tribal citizenship as applying to everyone listed on the tribal Dawes Rolls and their descendants, as long as individuals had a minimum blood quantum of one-eighth Sac and Fox blood (equivalent to one great-grandparent). They recognize that descendants may be brought up as culturally Sac and Fox while having mixed ancestry.

=== Late 20th century to present ===
The tribe has become increasingly active in asserting its sovereignty since the late 20th century. In 1983, the tribal government established its own system for registering vehicles and issuing license plates for tribal citizens. The state of Oklahoma tried to collect registration fees anyway, and the tribe sued. The US Supreme Court ruled in the tribe's favor of its independent sovereignty on May 17, 1993, in Oklahoma Tax Commission v. Sac & Fox Nation. Other tribes have since established their own systems for vehicle registration on tribal lands. The Sac and Fox Nation celebrate May 17 as "Victory Day."

Tribal officials have concentrated on the federal management of trust land fees and environmental issues on their land that has been leased for oil production. On May 16, 1989, a tribal representative group that included Elmer Manatowa, Principal Chief; Truman Carter, Treasurer; William Rice, Attorney General; James L. Welsh III, Director of Real Estate; and Curtis Cunard, Petroleum Consultant, testified before the 101st Congress, Special Committee on Investigations of the Select Committee on Indian Affairs, United States Senate. The testimony examined the federal government's management of water and natural resources of the Sac and Fox Nation. They testified to the extensive surface damage and permanent contamination of the tribal drinking water, which was destroyed by waterflooding techniques and the injection well process used by the oil companies. These officers also testified to the lack of federal oversight and trust management responsibilities, including fraudulent real estate appraisals of their lands. This historic testimony by the tribe's representatives, the result of their internal investigations, revealed the extensive mismanagement of the Bureau of Indian Affairs (BIA) and its failure in carrying out trust responsibilities.

== Treaties ==
Sac and Fox National Public Library, November 2026

The Sauk and Meskwaki signed a number of treaties with the United States Government in the nineteenth century, often signed with other tribal nations and involved relocation.

- The Treaty of St. Louis from November 3, 1804, which gave away large portions of the land of the Sauk and Meskwaki to the United States.
- The Treaty at Fort Armstrong, September 3, 1822 establishes a trading house where individuals of the tribes can be supplied at reasonable prices.
- Treaty from August 4, 1824
- Indian Treaty of Prairie du Chien, Michigan Territory, August 19, 1825
- Indian Treaty of Prairie du Chien, Michigan Territory, July 15, 1830
- Treaty at Fort Armstrong, Rock Island, Illinois, September 21, 1832
- Treaty with Iowa and Sauk and Fox of the Missouri at Fort Leavenworth, September 17, 1836
- Treaty with Sauk and Fox, September 27, 1836
- Treaty Ground on the Mississippi Opposite Rock Island, Dubuque County, Wisconsin Territory, September 28, 1836
- Treaty of Sauk and Fox (Confederated Tribes) in Washington, DC, October 21, 1837
- Treaty of Sauk and Fox Agency, Iowa Territory, October 11, 1842 where the Sauk and Meskwaki cede all lands West of the Mississippi River, to which they have any claim.
- Treaty of Sauk and Fox of Missouri, Washington, DC, May 18, 1854
- Treaty of Sauk and Fox Agency, Kansas Territory, July 16, 1859
- Treaty of Sauk and Fox Agency, Kansas Territory, October 1, 1859
- Treaty of Sauk and Fox of the Missouri and Iowa - Great Nemaha Agency, Nebraska Territory, March 6, 1861 details the cessation of land and relocation of the Sauk and Fox reservation in the Iowa Territory. The Sauk and Meskwaki are given part of the Iowa Tribe’s territory and current land will be sold by the U.S. Government. Profits will be used to develop the reservations.
- Treaty of Sauk and Fox of the Mississippi, Washington, DC, February 18, 1867

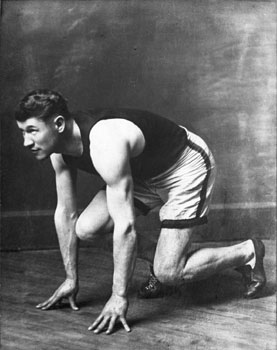
Jim Thorpe, Sac and Fox Nation Olympic athlete

== Notable Sac and Fox Nation citizens ==
- Sara K. Dye (born 1945), physician, surgeon
- Saginaw Grant (1936–2021), actor known for his roles in Breaking Bad and The Lone Ranger.
- Jim Thorpe (ca. 1888–1953), athlete who won gold medals in the decathlon and pentathlon at the 1912 Stockholm Olympics.

== See also ==
- Lake Osakis
- Meskwaki
- Sac and Fox Nation of Missouri in Kansas and Nebraska
- Sac and Fox Reservation
- Sac and Fox Tribe of the Mississippi in Iowa
- Unga-Chuk
