= Sara K. Dye =

Native American surgeon in South Dakota, U.S.

Sara K. Dye M.D.
- Born: 1945 (age 80–81)
- Citizenship: Sac and Fox Nation, American
- Education: Dartmouth Medical School, Northeastern State University
- Employer: Indian Health Service
- Known for: reducing diabetes-related amputations

Sara K. Dye (Sauk, born 1945) is an American physician and surgeon who has worked with Native American tribes in Oklahoma and South Dakota. She was director of the Indian Health Service's first noninvasive vascular laboratory and dedicated her career to reducing the number of amputations necessitated by diabetes among Native Americans.

== Early life ==
Dye was born in Oklahoma City, Oklahoma in 1945 and is a citizen of the Sac and Fox Nation and an Absentee Shawnee descendant.

== Education ==
When graduation from high school, a counselor discouraged Dye from becoming a physician, so Dye decided to pursue a career in X-ray technology. Receiving the highest grade on her X-ray technician exit exams, Dye decided to study medicine again. In 1968, Dye enrolled at Northeastern State University in Oklahoma for her undergraduate, where she graduated with a 3.8 GPA in pre-med. In 1971, Dye continued her education at the Dartmouth Medical School in New Hampshire, and in 1975 she graduated with her Doctorate in Medicine. Later in 1983, Dye returned and completed a residency with Dartmouth-Hitchcock Medical Center of New Hampshire.

== Career ==
=== Oklahoma ===
Returning to Oklahoma, Dye took a position as a general medical officer in Claremore Indian Hospital. In 1983, after completing a residency in general surgery, Dye became the sixteenth practicing Native American Surgeon in the United States, when she was named the staff surgeon at Carl Albert Indian Hospital. Dye continued working there for the next ten years working in research, women's health, and preventive healthcare and as director of the Non-Invasive Vascular Laboratory. Dye also worked with the Indian Health services in Administration/management, and research and training during her time in Ada, Oklahoma. In between her hospital work and IHS work, Dye served on the admission board of the University of Oklahoma College of Medicine.

=== South Dakota ===
In 1994 Dye moved to Aberdeen, South Dakota to accept a position with the Indian Health Service as the chief medical officer. Starting at the same time, Dye became a consulting surgeon at Cheyenne River Indian Hospital. As the chief medical officer, Dye stood on committees for Infant Mortality Study (IMS) and the Perinatal Infant Mortality Review (PRMR). Those committees look into the infant mortality rates of the Native American populations and SIDS or Sudden Infant Death Syndrome.

Dye began teaching in 2003 when she took an Assistant Professor position at the University of South Dakota. Dye continues to teach in Aberdeen, South Dakota, as a Clinical Assistant Professor with a focus in Family medicine for the University of South Dakota's Sanford School of Medicine. She was the chief medical officer for Indian Health Service in Aberdeen in 2004.
