= Cecelia Miksekwe Jackson =

Potawatomi language activist from Kansas (1922–2011)

- Born: Cecelia Potts; October 2, 1922 near Mayetta, Kansas
- Died: May 29, 2011 (aged 88)
- Citizenship: Prairie Band Potawatomi Nation • U.S.
- Occupations: Language advocate, dressmaker, cook

Cecelia "Meeks" Miksekwe Jackson (October 2, 1922 – May 29, 2011) was a Bodéwademi (Neshnabé/Potawatomi) woman from Kansas in the United States who worked to preserve Bodwéwadmimwen, a critically endangered Algonquian language. She was a native speaker.

== Biography ==
Cecelia Miksekwe Jackson was born to Rosann Lasley Potts and Joseph Bill Potts on October 2, 1922, on the Bodéwademi reservation near Mayetta, Kansas. She was a citizen of Prairie Band Potawatomi Nation, or Mshkodésik Nation. Jackson was multilingual, speaking Bodwéwadmimwen, Anishinaabemowin (Ojibwe), Daawaamwin (Odawa), and English. She worked for many years at the Slimaker Dress Factory in Holton, Kansas and later as a cook.

=== Language revitalization ===
Cecelia Miksekwe Jackson was the last fluent, native speaker of Bodwéwadmimwen (Potawatomi) belonging to the Prairie Band Potawatomi Nation (PBPN). Despite the small number of speakers, the PBPN is "regarded as a language stronghold" because of its efforts to preserve the language. The PBPN founded a language and culture program in 1998, using a federal grant from the ANA. Jackson was instrumental in the language program's work. She helped create a Bodwéwadmimwen–English dictionary, a grammar book, audio and video material, and a storybook in Bodwéwadmimwen. Cindy Ledere, a teacher with the language program, said, "Almost all the work here has come from her." Speaking to a reporter, Jackson implored parents to speak to their children in Bodwéwadmimwen to preserve the language.

In 2010, Jackson was honored with a ceremonial dinner, sponsored by the tribal council, for her work to preserve the language. More than 200 people attended.

== Personal life ==
Cecelia Miksekwe Jackson adhered to the Drum Religion or Dream Dance, a Native American religion founded by Turkey Tailfeather Woman, a Dakota woman, in the 19th century. The religion spread to many other Native nations, including the Ojibwe, Meskwaki, Othaakiiwaki (Sauk), Šaawanwaki (Shawnee), Mamaceqtaw (Menominee), and the Bodéwademi of Kansas.

Jackson was a member of the local chapter of the American Legion Auxiliary, made of the partners and family members of veterans in the American Legion. She had two children and was a great-grandmother at the time of her death. She died at 88 years old on May 29, 2011.
