= Pikangikum First Nation =

Indigenous reserve in Ontario, Canada

Pikangikum 14 Bigaanjigamiing
- Indian reserve
- Pikangikum Indian Reserve No. 14
- Location within Ontario
- Coordinates: 51°48′N 94°00′W
- Country: Canada
- Province: Ontario
- District: Kenora
- First Nation: Pikangikum

Government
  - Chief: Paddy Peters

Area
  - Land: 8.59 km^{2} (3.32 sq mi)
- Elevation: 335 m (1,099 ft)

Population (2011)
  - Total: 2,100 (2,011 census) 4,500 (2,019 reported)
  - Density: 111.3/km^{2} (288/sq mi)
- Time zone: UTC-6 (CST)
  - Summer (DST): UTC-5 (CDT)
- Postal code: P0V 2L0
- Area code: 807

Pikangikum First Nation (/pɪˈkændʒɪkəm/, Ojibwe: Bigaanjigamiing, unpointed ᐱᑲᐣᒋᑲᒥᐠ, pointed ᐱᑳᐣᒋᑲᒦᐣᐠ) is an Ojibwe First Nation located on the 1,808-hectare (4,470-acre) Pikangikum 14 Reserve, in Unorganized Kenora District in Northwestern Ontario, Canada. The main centre is the community of Pikangikum, on Pikangikum Lake on the Berens River, part of the Hudson Bay drainage system; it is approximately 100 kilometres (60 mi) north of the town of Red Lake.

The community has a registered population as of September 2011 of 2,443, of whom 2,334 live on the reserve.

== History ==
A 2005 Wawatay Native Communications Society survey found that the residents of Pikangikum have one of the highest rates of original language retention of any First Nation in Northern Ontario. The language is Ojibwe, the major dialect of Anishinaabe peoples (see Berens River Ojibwe language).

In 2000, the First Nation was reported to have the highest suicide rate in the world. A report by the Office of the Chief Coroner of Ontario released June 1, 2011 regarding 16 deaths by suicide between 2006 and 2008 on the reserve showed a pattern of inhalant abuse by young people aggravated by poor educational, health, child welfare, and other services.

== Clans ==
The community has the following doodem (clans):

- Caribou (Adik)
- Sturgeon (Name)
- Pelican (Zhashagi)
- Skunk (Zhigaag)

== Government ==
The Pikangikum First Nation is governed by a council elected via a custom electoral system consisting of a chief, deputy chief and nine councillors. Pikangikum First Nation is a member of Treaty 5 (through the initial signing on 20 September 1875 at Berens River, Manitoba) and the Independent First Nations Alliance.

In 2023, Shirley Keeper was the chief. Paddy Peters is the chief as of 2026.

== Transportation ==
The community is accessible primarily by airplane at the Pikangikum Airport, although it is also served by Pikangikum Water Aerodrome. It has winter road access north to Poplar Hill First Nation and south to Red Lake and Ontario Highway 125.

== Education ==
The community's only school burned down in 2007, with all students learning in portables until the opening of Eenchokay Birchstick School in 2016.

== Economy ==
Unemployment rates are estimated to be around 90% in Pikangikum. Traditional subsistence economies are not factored into the employment rate calculation.

In November 2020, Pikangikum became the first community in Canada to gain access to the beta version of the Starlink satellite internet constellation, providing limited high-speed Internet access to the community for the first time.

=== Whitefeather Forest Initiative ===
Since 1996, Pikangikum First Nation has been pursuing its Whitefeather Forest Initiative (Ojibwe: pointed: ᐚᐱᒦᑿᓐ ᓅᐦᐱᒫᐦᑲᒥᒃ ᒫᒋᐦᑖᐏᓐ; unpointed: ᐘᐱᒥᑿᓐ ᓄᐱᒪᑲᒥᒃ ᒪᒋᑕᐏᓐ; Waabimiigwan Noopimaakamig Maajitaawin), a land-based community economic development renewal and resource stewardship initiative. Through this Initiative the First Nation is working with the Government of Ontario to manage the Whitefeather Forest, 12,200 square kilometres (4,700 sq mi) of Crown land in the Pikangikum customary land-use area. In 2006 the First Nation completed their land use strategy named Keeping the Land, which was approved by the Province through the Ministry of Natural Resources. The land use strategy provides guidance for the future management of proposed new land-use activities, such as commercial forestry, protected areas and eco-cultural tourism. Keeping the Land provides a vision for the management of proposed new land uses rooted in the indigenous knowledge and customary stewardship traditions of Pikangikum people. Keeping the Land is made up of three key components (WFMC 2006):

1. Stewardship Strategy — an obligation to respect all living beings
2. Customary Activities — all those physical, mental and spiritual states of well-being that are needed for survival on the land.
3. Economic Development — new livelihood practices adapted to customary stewardship approach to provide for the survival of Pikangikum people in a contemporary cultural context.

== Recreation ==
Hockey is played by Pikangikum youth on the adjacent Lake Pikangikum.

== Health concerns ==
=== Youth suicide ===
Over the past two decades, Pikangikum First Nation has experienced extraordinarily high youth suicide rates; recent averages for 1992 to 2000 exceed 200 per 100,000, possibly the highest rate of suicide of any community in the world. In 2000, 470 per 100,000 deaths were attributed to suicide. As of 2011 the situation had not changed. In the summer of 2008, eight people between the ages of 8 and 18 died by suicide. Again, in mid-year 2010, five people between the ages of 16 and 26 had already taken their lives prompting the former chief of the community to issue a cry for assistance. In total, there have been 74 documented cases of suicide from 1990 to 2007, many of whom were women and girls who habitually huff gasoline. The perpetual cycle of grief in Pikangikum makes this situation unique. Due to influence of Elders in the community, who strongly voice their religious opposition to burying Aboriginal youth who have died by suicide in cemeteries, families of youth who have taken their own lives are forced to bury their family members in their own front yards. Burial in the front yard is an Ojibwa tradition. Community guided increases and enhancements in cultural programming such alongside an increased reserve land-base (allowing for greater physical freedom and the expansion of subsistence economies) correlate to a reduction in suicide rate. The transference of educational models from institutional to cultural also results in a reduction of the suicide rate. Increased awareness of the importance and value of Indigenous cultural practices and knowledge across non-native populations also leads to a reduction in the suicide rate.

=== Water advisories ===
Pikangikum was under boil-water advisory for more than 10 years. The supply of clean running water was negatively affected by inadequate power supply by the community's diesel power generator.
