= Sauk language =

Algonquian language

Sauk
- Thâkiwâtowêweni
- Native to: United States
- Region: Central Oklahoma
- Ethnicity: Sauk people
- Native speakers: 5 (2011)
- Language family: Algic: Algonquian; Fox; Sauk

Language codes
- ISO 639-3: sac
- Glottolog: sacc1239
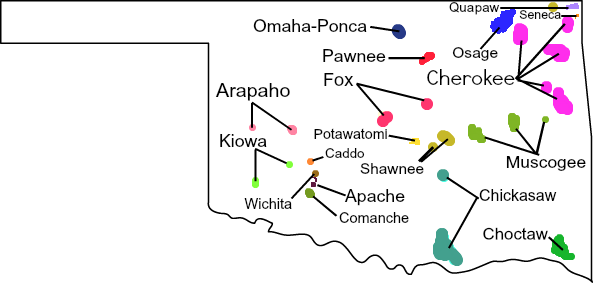
- Map depicts Oklahoma Indian Language distribution in the State of Oklahoma

Sauk, also known as Thâkiwâtowêweni (Thâkîwaki language), is either a dialect of the Fox language or a distinct language spoken by the Sauk people. One of the many Algonquian languages, it is very closely related to the dialects spoken by the Meskwaki and the Kickapoo tribes. Each of the dialects contains archaisms and innovations that distinguish them from each other. Sauk and Meskwaki appear to be the most closely related of the three, reflecting the peoples' long relationship. Sauk is considered to be mutually intelligible, to a point, with Meskawaki.

In their own language, the Sauk at one time called themselves asakiwaki [a-'sak-i-wa-ki], "people of the outlet". The Sauk people have a syllabic orthography for their language. They published a Primer Book in 1975, based on a "traditional" syllabary that existed in 1906. It is intended to help modern-day Sauk to learn to write and speak their ancestral tongue. A newer orthography was proposed around 1994 to aid in language revival. The former syllabary was aimed at remaining native speakers of Sauk; the more recent orthography was developed for native English speakers, as many Sauk grow up with English as their first language.

Today, only five elders fluently speak Sauk. With so few speakers, Sauk is considered an endangered language, as are many other Indigenous languages in North America.

In 2005, A Concise Dictionary of the Sauk Language was published using the Algonquianist Standard Roman Orthography.

In 2012, Shawnee High School in Shawnee, Oklahoma, began to offer a Sauk language course.

== Endangerment ==
The use of Sauk was actively discouraged and frequently punished in boarding schools during the late 19th and early 20th centuries. It rapidly declined as a language used in everyday communication between the years 1935 and 1945. Nowadays, the main language of the Sauk is English and only a few elders know Sauk.

A conflict for the preservation of the language, is that the original syllabary created was intended for the use of native Sauk speakers, and its clarification was designed from the Sauk language. This is a problem because this is no longer as helpful for the majority of the Sac and Fox nation, as the official tribe language today is English. The issue arises in instances when Sauk is being taught to a school in the tribe, and an elder, who is fluent in the language, disagrees with the pronunciation being taught.

== Phonology ==
Sauk does not have many phonemes in comparison to many other languages: four vowels, two semivowels, and nine consonants.

=== Consonants ===
The following consonant phonemes are given in Reinschmidt (1995):

Consonant phonemes
	Bilabial	Dental	Alveolar	Palatal	Velar	Glottal
Stop	p		t	tʃ	k	
Fricative		θ		ʃ		h
Nasal	m		n			
Approximant				j	w	

/ʃ/ is primarily heard as [ʃ], but may also alternate as [s] among speakers in free variation.

The representation of /h/ was omitted in the 1977 syllabary. It was added back in later editions because it is phonemic in the Sauk language.

Reinschmidt symbolizes /j/ as ⟨y⟩, following Americanist practice.

All four stops have at least two allophones each, one fortis and one lenis:

- /p/ → [p, hp]
- /t/ → [t, ht]
- /t͡ʃ/ → [t͡ʃ, ht͡ʃ]
- /k/ → [k, hk]

=== Vowels ===
	Front	Back
High	i iː	o oː
Low	ɛ ɛː	ɑ ɑː

Vowel length is distinctive in its function. Long vowels are often distinguished orthographically by the doubling of characters, such as ⟨a/aa⟩ representing two different spoken lengths. This is different for the vowel ⟨e⟩, as a lengthened version of this vowel shares the sound of the vowel in the English word bear. Reinschmidt presents four vowels, each with two allophones:

- /ɑ/ → [ɑ, ɑː]
- /ɛ/ → [ɛ, ɛː]
- /i/ → [i, iː]
- /o/ → [o, oː]

=== Pitch and tone ===
Pitch and tone are important when speaking Sauk, as there is a general rule of emphasizing the first or second syllable of phrases, and slowly fades away by the end of a word. The Sauk language is perceived as having a "swallowed" quality when referring to the ends of phrases and words, so pitch, tone and intonation is a concept that would come from learning the language as opposed to studying the syllabary.

=== Syllables ===
Both the Sauk and Fox languages are known for "swallowing" syllables in word-final position, which can make identification of individual sounds more difficult for the language learner.

== Morphology ==
Sauk is a polysynthetic language. Because this can easily pose great difficulties to learners with little to no experience with highly synthetic languages, the Sauk orthography has words written by identifying each syllable.

== Samples ==
Two samples of written Sauk language, as they appear in Reinschmidt 1995:

Ho! Ne nu ta ma

'Hi! I speak Sauk!'

Ni swi me cli ke a ki a la se te ke wa ki a la te ki ki e ka ta wi ke mi yak i e we li ke mi ya ki ne ko ti me cle ke a e cla gwe ne mo tti wi ne li wi tti cle we na li ta ske wa ne li se ke

'Two turtles were sunning on a bank when a thunderstorm approached. When it began to rain, one turtle said to the other, 'I don't want to get wet,' and jumped into the lake.'
