= Berens River Ojibwe dialect =

Ojibwe dialect in Canada

Berens River Ojibwe is a dialect of the Ojibwe language spoken along the Berens River in northern Ontario and Manitoba. Berens communities include Pikangikum and Poplar Hill, both in Ontario, well as Little Grand Rapids, in Manitoba. Berens is strongly distinguished from the Severn Ojibwe dialect spoken in communities directly to the north.

Berens River Ojibwe is most commonly written using the Cree syllabary widely used to write Ojibwe in northern Ontario.

Berens River Ojibwe is not included in Ethnologue.

== See also ==
- Little Grand Rapids, Manitoba
- Pikangikum First Nation
- Poplar Hill First Nation
