= Unga-Chuk =

Unga-Chuk of the Nsswe Neppe is a mythological character from the Sauk and Meskwaki peoples in what is now central Iowa.

The Meskwaki (Fox) and Asikiwaki (Sauk/Sac) were related to each other and spoke the same language, but were politically independent. However, the Fox tribe was nearly destroyed in a war with the French and the surviving Fox Indians fled to the Sauk villages for protection. The two tribes merged into a single tribe called the Sac and Fox. Most Sac and Fox people still live together today. The version below was collected by John Tobin in his book With No Intention.

== Legend ==
Unga-Chuk's story takes place on the Cedar River in Iowa. Unga-Chuk lived in a clearing by the banks of the river. The exact setting is referred to as the meeting of The Three Waters. He was the grandson of Chief Poweshiek and the son of Magor. He was considered the pride of the village. Life was good until Magor, his father, did not return from a hunt. Unga-Chuk then went to live with his grandfather and learned to become a great leader in his village.

The people in the village lived very peaceful and happy lives with Unga-Chuk marrying his sweetheart Lees-Wa. Later Unga-Chuk one day saw visions that upset him. The first being three trees silhouetted like people on the horizon. The two trees were to one side of a tree that stood alone. Then Unga-Chuk saw three suns setting (possibly explained today as sundogs). The visions were strange and troubling to the tribe. However, since good fortune followed, the signs were soon forgotten.

A few years later, an evil man in the village named Napatog started to hate Unga-Chuk, becoming jealous of his skills and the fact that he would be the next chief of the village. Napatog planned to murder Unga-Chuk, then he would become the next chief.

Napatog waited until Unga-Chuk took a morning walk in the foggy valley to carry out his plan of murder. He shot and killed Unga-Chuk with an arrow. The day turned bright and sunny except where the body of Unga-Chuk lay. The villagers soon began to worry about this mystery fog. The village soon discovered what had happened and rose up to drive Napatog away. The village was rewarded with a beautiful sunset that let them know that Unga-Chuk made it safely to his final resting place. Unga-Chuk's death brought peace to the village and he removed all evils from the tribes.

The story finishes with a red rose growing in Nesswe Neppe as proof that the blood spilled by Unga-Chuk nourished and made the ground of this land fertile and good.

It is said that on the anniversary of Unga-Chuk's death, when the fog is lifting from the valley, he can be heard still calling for his beloved Lees-Wa.
