= Fox language =

Algonquian language spoken in US and Mexico

Fox
- Meskwaki-Sauk-Kickapoo
- Meshkwahkihaki
- Native to: United States, Mexico
- Region: Central Oklahoma, Northeastern Kansas, Iowa, and Coahuila
- Ethnicity: 760 Meskwaki and Sauk and 820 Kickapoo in the US (2000 census) and 423 Mexican Kickapoo (2010 census)
- Native speakers: 700: 250 Sauk and Fox and 400 Kickapoo in the US (2007–2015); 60 Kickapoo in Mexico (2020 census)
- Language family: Algic: Algonquian; Fox
- Dialects: Fox; Sauk; Kickapoo
- Writing system: Latin, Great Lakes Algonquian syllabics

Language codes
- ISO 639-3: sac (Fox and Sauk)
- Glottolog: foxx1245
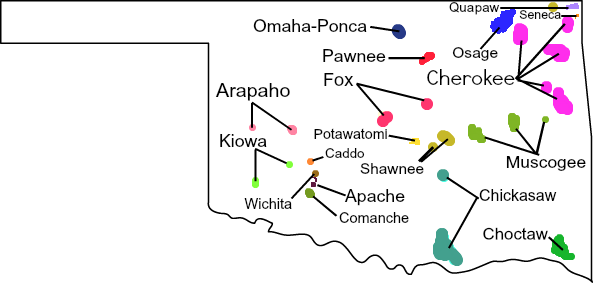
- Map showing the distribution of Oklahoma Indian Languages

- Kickapoo is classified as Severely Endangered by the UNESCO Atlas of the World's Languages in Danger.

Fox, also known as Mesquakie (Meskwaki), Mesquakie-Sauk, Mesquakie-Sauk-Kickapoo, Sauk, or Sauk-Fox, is an indigenous language of North America in the Algonquian language family. The language is spoken in several dialects by the Meskwaki, Sauk, and Kickapoo in various locations in the Midwestern United States and in northern Mexico.

== Dialects ==
The three proposed extant dialects or languages in the family are:

- Fox or Meskwakiatoweni (Meskwaki language)
- Sauk or Thâkiwâtowêweni
- Kickapoo or Kiikaapoa

Mascouten may have been another dialect, though there are few historical records of it.

There is no clear consensus as to whether whether Fox, Sauk, and Kickapoo are three distinct languages or three dialects of the same language. While some academics have declared them "closely related dialects," Goddard states that Meskwaki and Sauk are mutually unintelligible.

== Revitalization ==
Most speakers are elderly or middle-aged, making it highly endangered. The tribal school at the Meskwaki Settlement in Iowa incorporates bilingual education for children. In 2011, the Meskwaki Sewing Project was created, to bring mothers and girls together "with elder women in the Meskwaki Senior Center sewing traditional clothing and learning the Meskwaki language."

Prominent scholars doing research on the language include Ives Goddard, Lucy Thomason of the Smithsonian Institution, and Amy Dahlstrom of the University of Chicago.

== Phonology ==
Until the early 1900s, Fox was a phonologically very conservative language and preserved many features of Proto-Algonquian; records from the decades immediately following 1900 are particularly useful to Algonquianists for this reason. By the 1960s, however, an extensive progression of phonological changes had taken place, including the loss of intervocalic semivowels, the shortening of the resulting vowels in hiatus, the loss of word-final vowels, and the contraction of functional morphemes into allegro forms.

=== Consonants ===
The consonant phonemes of Fox are given in the table below.

		Bilabial	Alveolar	Palatal (-alveolar)	Velar	Glottal
Nasal		m	n			
Plosive/ Affricate	tenuis	p	t	tʃ	k	
Plosive/ Affricate	preasp.	ʰp	ʰt	ʰtʃ	ʰk	
Fricative			s	ʃ		h
Approximant				j	w	

- Other than those involving a consonant plus /j/ or /w/, the only possible consonant cluster is /ʃk/.

=== Vowels ===
The Fox language has eight vowel phonemes:

	Front		Back	
	short	long	short	long
Close	i	iː	o	oː
Open	e	eː	a	aː

== Grammar ==
According to A Concise Dictionary of the Sauk Language by Gordon Whittaker, the language's nouns can be divided into animate and inanimate groups. Animate nouns end in -a (ex: tîtîwa /ˈti:.ti:.wa/, "blue jay (bird)"). To pluralise most animate nouns, the ending is transformed from -a to -aki (ex: tîtîwa -> tîtîwaki). The few exceptions that exist have specific forms, according to the Dictionary.

Inanimate nouns typically end in -i (ex: mâtethi /ˈma:.tet.hi/, "knife"). To pluralise most inanimate nouns, the ending is transformed from -i to -ani (ex: mâtethi -> mâtethani). Like the animate nouns, the few exceptions that exist also have specific forms, according to the Dictionary.

Verbs can be divided into transitive and intransitive; transitive involves two parties (i.e "I give it to you!" / "Kemînêwene!"), while intransitive is one party (i.e "You're alive." / "Kepemâtethi.")

Animate intransitive (using "pemâtethiwa" as an example)
Subject	Verb (Sauk)	Translation
ne(t)- (I/me)	nepemâtethi	I am alive
ke(t)- (you)	kepemâtethi	you are alive
-wa (s/he)	pemâtethiwa	s/he is alive
ne(t)- ... -pena (we [exclusive])	nepemâtethipena	we (exclusive; think "We, but not YOU.") are alive
ke(t)- ... -pena (we [inclusive])	kepemâtethipena	we (inclusive; think "We and you.") are alive
ke(t)- ... -pwa (you [plural])	kepemâtethipwa	you (plural) are alive; you all are alive
-waki (they)	pemâtethiwaki	they are alive

Inanimate intransitive (using "kehkyâhiwa" as an example)
Subject	Verb (Sauk)	Translation
-wi (it)	kehkyêwi	it is old
-wani (they [inanimate])	kehkyâhiwani	they (inanim.) are old

Animate transitive (using "ahkawâpatamwa" as an example)
Subject	Verb (Sauk)	Translation
ke(t)- ... -ene (I -> you)	netahkawâpatene	I take care of you (ahkawâpatamwa can also mean to watch out [for] / look out [for])
ke(t)- ... -enepwa (I -> you [plural])	netahkawâpatenepwa	I take care of you (plural); I take care of you all
ne(t)- ... -âwa (I -> him/her)	netahkawâpatâwa	I take care of him/her
ne(t)- ... -âwaki (I -> them)	netahkawâpatâwaki	I take care of them
ke(t)- ... -i (you -> me)	ketahkawâpati	you take care of me
ke(t)- ... -âwa (you -> him/her)	ketahkawâpatâwa	you take care of him/her
ke(t)- ... -ipena (you -> us)	ketahkawâpatipena	you take care of us
ke(t)- ... -enepena (we -> you)	ketahkawâpatenepena	we take care of you
ne(t)- ... -ekwa (s/he -> me)	netahkawâpatekwa	s/he takes care of me
ke(t)- ... -ekwa (s/he -> you)	ketahkawâpatekwa	s/he takes care of you
-êwa (s/he -> him/her/them)	ahkawâpatêwa	s/he takes care of him/her/them
ne(t)- ... -ekonâna (s/he -> us [exc.])	netahkawâpatekonâna	s/he takes care of us (exc.)
ke(t)- ... -ekonâna (s/he -> us [inc.])	ketahkawâpatekonâna	s/he takes care of us (inc.)
ke(t)- ... -ekowâwa (s/he -> you [plural])	ketahkawâpatekowâwa	s/he takes care of you (plural); s/he takes care of you all
ne(t)- ... -âpena (we [exc.] -> him/her/them)	netahkawâpatâpena	we (exc.) take care of him/her/them
ke(t)- ... -âpena (we [inc.] -> him/her/them)	ketahkawâpatâpena	we (inc.) take care of him/her/them
ke(t)- ... -ipwa (you [plural] -> me)	ketahkawâpatipwa	you (plural) take care of me; you all take care of me
ke(t)- ... -âpwa (you [plural] -> him/her/them)	ketahkawâpatâpwa	you (plural) take care of him/her/them; you all take care of him/her/them
ne(t)- ... -ekôki (they -> me)	netahkawâpatekôki	they take care of me
ke(t)- ... -ekôki (they -> you)	ketahkawâpatekôki	they take care of you
-êwaki (they -> him/her/them)	ahkawâpatêwaki	they take care of him/her/them
ne(t)- ... -ekonânaki (they -> us [exc.])	netahkawâpatekonânaki	they take care of us (exc.)
ke(t)- ... -ekonânaki (they -> us [inc.])	ketahkawâpatekonânaki	they take care of us (inc.)
ke(t)- ... -ekowâwaki (they -> you [plural])	ketahkawâpatekowâwaki	they take care of you (plural); they take care of you all

Inanimate transitive (using "ahkawâpatamwa" as an example)
Subject	Verb (Sauk)	Translation
ne(t)- ... -a (I -> it/them)	netahkawâpata	I take care of it/them (ahkawâpatamwa can also mean to watch out [for] / look out [for])
ke(t)- ... -a (You -> it/them)	ketahkawâpata	You take care of it/them
-amwa (S/He -> it/them)	ahkawâpatamwa	S/He takes care of it/them
ne(t)- ... -âpena (We [exc.] -> it/them)	netahkawâpatâpena	We (exc.) take care of it/them
ke(t)- ... -âpena (We [inc.] -> it/them)	ketahkawâpatâpena	We (inc.) take care of it/them
ke(t)- ... -âpwa (You [plural] -> it/them)	ketahkawâpatâpwa	You [plural] take care of it/them
-âmoki (They -> it/them)	ahkawâpatamwâmoki	They take care of it/them

This conjugation is only for verbs that end in -amwa; all other animate transitive verbs take the same conjugation as the animate intransitive verbs.

== Vocabulary ==
Sauk numerals are as follows:

nekoti	one
nîshwi	two
nethwi	three
nyêwi	four
nyânanwi	five
nekotwâshika	six
nôhika	seven
neshwâshika	eight
shâka	nine
metâthwi	ten

== Writing systems ==
Letter in the Kickapoo language written in Coahuila, Mexico, in the 1950s

Besides the Latin script, Fox has been written in two indigenous scripts.

=== Fox I ===
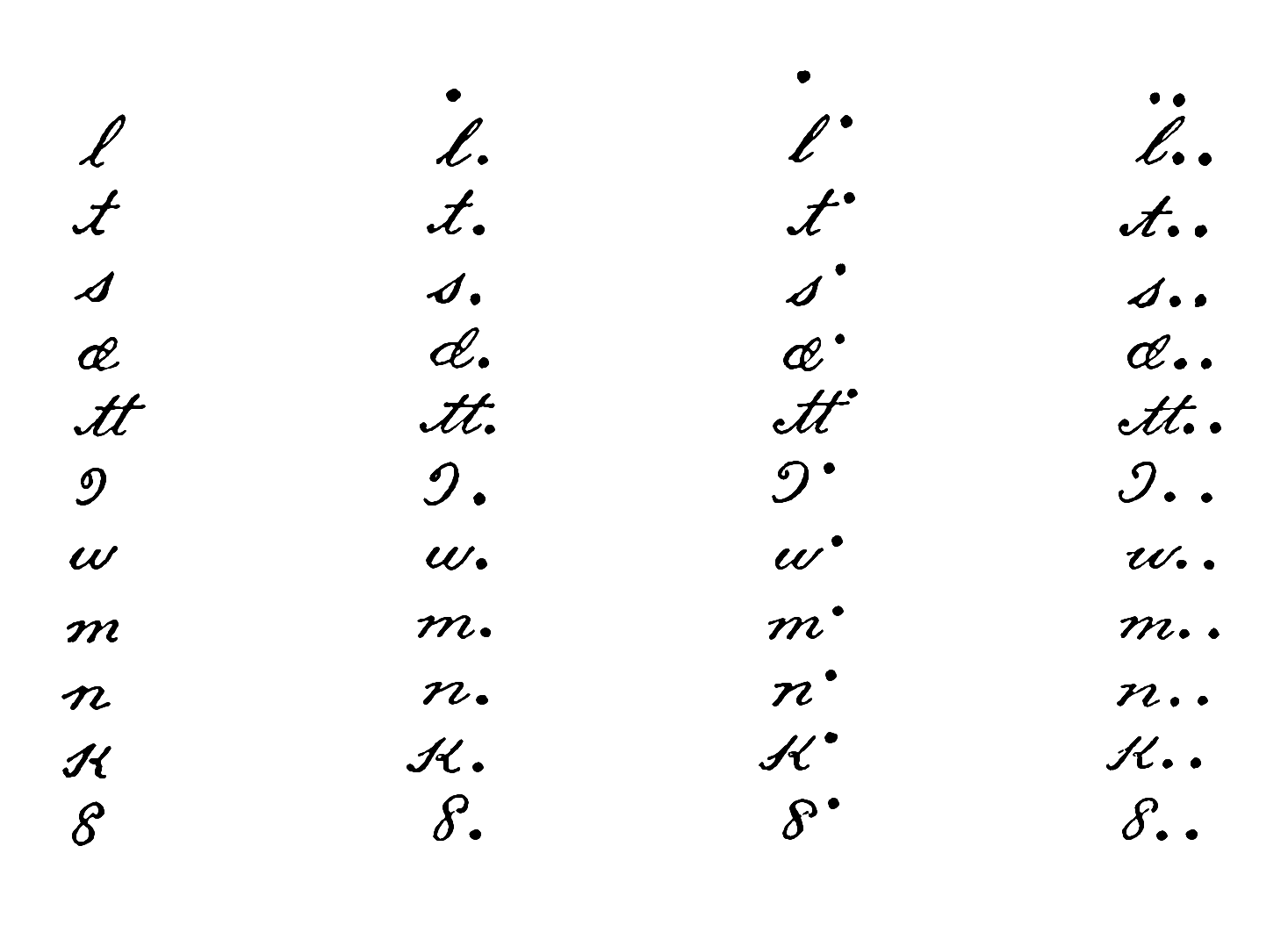
The Fox I script

"Fox I" is an abugida based on the cursive French alphabet (see Great Lakes Algonquian syllabics). Consonants written by themselves are understood to be syllables containing the vowel /a/. They are:

Syllable
𝓁 (Note: Written as a tall loop, similar to a cursive b or l.)	/pa/
𝓉	/ta/
𝓈	/sa/
𝒸𝓁	/ʃa/ (Note: Character ⟨d⟩ for /š/ derives from French ⟨ch⟩.)
𝓉𝓉	/tʃa/ (Note: Character ⟨tt⟩ for /č/ derives from French ⟨tch⟩.)
ℐ (Note: The cursive form of capital I is a more graphically accurate approximation for /ja/; the actual character is a small clockwise loop with a long tail.)	/ya/
𝓌	/wa/
𝓂	/ma/
𝓃	/na/
𝒦	/ka/
𝛿 (Note: The actual character for /gwa/ or /kwa/ is shaped more like a cursive g or a with a long, winding tail that goes in a loop, almost like a figure-8 shape.)	/kwa/ (Note: Character ⟨q⟩ for /kw/ derives from French ⟨q(u)⟩.)

Vowels are written by adding dots to the consonant:

𝓁	/pa/
𝓁.	/pe/
𝓁·	/pi/
𝓁..	/po/

=== Fox II ===
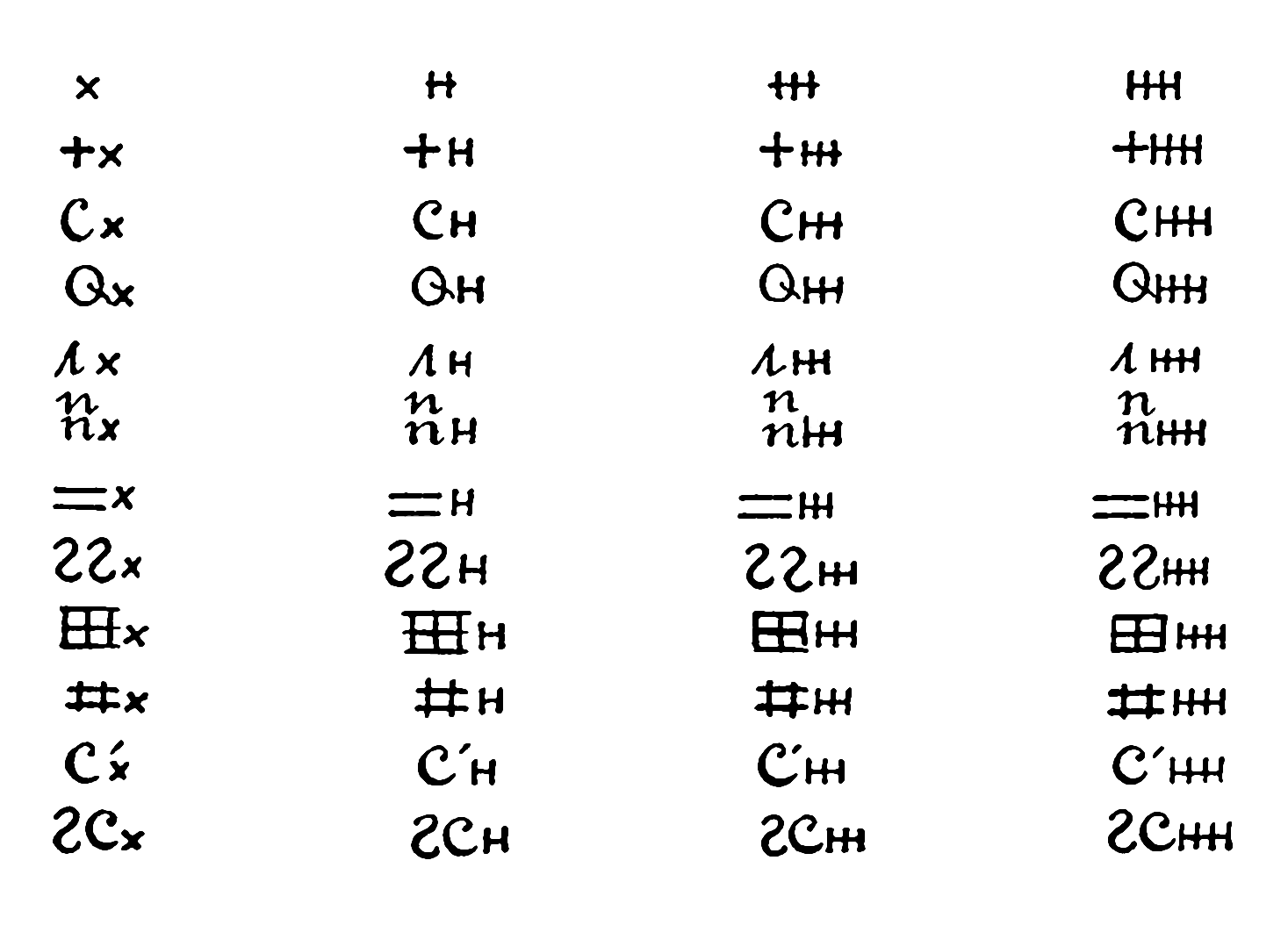
The Fox II script

"Fox II" is a consonant–vowel alphabet. According to Coulmas, /p/ is not written (as /a/ is not written in Fox I). Vowels (or /p/ plus a vowel) are written as cross-hatched tally marks.

Consonants (approximately)
+	/t/
𝒞	/s/
ⵕ	/ʃ/
𝒾	/tʃ/ (Note: Without the dot/tittle)
ñ	/v/ (Note: Actually like one script n stacked on another.)
═	/j/
ƧƧ	/w/
𐌎	/m/
ⵌ	/n/
𝒞ʼ	/k/
Ƨ𝒞	/kw/

Vowels (approximately)
x	/a/
ʜ	/e/ (Note: This is like a small capital H with the cross-bar sticking out on either side.)
ⱶʜ	/i/ (Note: Resembles Chinese 卅 but lower and wider.)
ʜʜ	/o/ (Note: Resembles Chinese 卌, but lower and wider.)

== See also ==
- Sac and Fox Nation
- Sauk language
- Kickapoo language
- Kickapoo whistled speech
