= Algonquian sound laws =

Proto-Algonquian is one of the best-reconstructed proto-languages of the Americas. As it broke up, its daughters, such as Cree, Menominee, Ojibwe and Arapaho, changed the original phonology of Proto-Algonquian and gave rise to new languages. Notable changes include the merger of *θ and *r in most descendant languages, the merger of short *i and *e in Cree and Ojibwe, the far-reaching and unexpected sound shifts of Plains Algonquian languages, and the simplification of original clusters in the Algonquian languages.

== Consonants and clusters ==
Proto-Algonquian is reconstructed as having eleven consonants: *p, *t, *č, *k, *m, *n, *θ (sometimes reconstructed as *ɬ), *s, *š, *h, and *r (sometimes reconstructed as *l); additionally, *ʔ (likely a merger of preconsonantal *p and *k) appeared in clusters. Two semivowels *w and *y also existed in Proto-Algonquian, but are best considered prevocalic allophones of *o and *i respectively. (However, because they or their reflexes are usually treated as full consonants in the daughters, they will be treated as such here.) Between vowels, clusters of up to three consonants were allowed; the mainstream view is that the following clusters were permitted:

PA Consonant Clusters
	p	k	t	č	θ	s	š	r	m
ʔ			*ʔt	*ʔč	*ʔθ	*ʔs	*ʔš	*ʔr	*Hm
h	*hp	*hk	*ht	*hč	*hθ	*hs	*hš	(*hr)	*Hm
N	*mp	*nk	*nt	*nč	*nθ	*ns	*nš	*nr	
č	*čp	*čk							
š	*šp	*šk	(*št)						
θ	*θp	*θk							
s	*sp	*sk							
r		*rk							

Clusters beginning with *s and *r in the table above (as according to Ives Goddard) are reconstructed as beginning with the arbitrary symbols *x and *ç, respectively, by Bloomfield. The cluster written *Hm in the table above has a reflex of p or m in most of the daughter languages, but has a reflex of hm in Munsee Delaware. Additionally, any consonant or cluster of consonants could be followed by the semivowels *w or *y, with *čw and *hy not occurring, and with *t and *θ replaced regularly by *č and *š before *i, *i· and *y. *št and *hr were of limited distribution.

In the following table, the most common reflexes of Proto-Algonquian single consonants (those not members of a cluster) in selected daughter languages are compared. Some unusual outcomes with more complicated conditions are not included (such as the contraction of initial and postconsonantal *we and *ye to o and i in the non-Eastern languages.)

PA	Eastern			Central				Plains		
PA	Massachusett	Delaware	Shawnee	Fox	Menominee	Ojibwe	Cree	Arapaho	Blackfoot	Cheyenne
*p	p	p	p	p	p	b	p	k; č^{1}	p	Ø^{3}; hp^{4}; p
*t	t	t	t	t	t	d	t	t	t, st^{7}, ts^{1}	t; ht^{4}
*č	č	č	č	č	c /č/	j /ǯ/	c	θ	s^{3}, t, st^{7}, ts^{1}	s
*k	k, t^{y 5}	k	k	k	k	g	k	Ø	k, ks^{6}	k; hk^{4}
*m	m	m	m	m	m	m	m	b^{1}; w^{2}	m	m
*n	n	n	n	n	n	n	n	n	n	n
*θ	n	l	l	n	n	n, zh /ž/^{6}	t	θ	t, st^{7}, ts^{1}	t
*s	s	s	θ	s	s	z	s	n^{3}; h	s^{3}, xs	h
*š	s	š	š	š	s	zh /ž/	s	s, x^{2}	s^{3}, t, st^{7}, ts^{1}	š
*h	h	h	h	h	h	', h /ʔ/ ⟨h⟩	h	h	/ʔ/	h
*r	n	l	l	n	n	n, zh /ž/^{6}	y	n	s^{3}, t, st^{7}, ts^{1}	t
*w	w; Ø^{4}	w	w	w	w	w	w	n	w, y^{8}, Ø^{9}	v^{3, 4}
*y	y; Ø^{4}	y	y	y	y	y	y	n	s, y^{10}, Ø^{11}	t^{3}, n

^{1} Before a front vowel (i, i·, e or e·).

^{2} Before a back vowel (a, o, a· or o·).

^{3} Word-initially.

^{4} Between vowels.

^{5} Before PA *ē (occasionally also before *i, *ī).

^{6} Before *i, *i·, or *y.

^{7} After *i(·) or *#e.

^{8} Between a consonant and *i#.

^{9} After a consonant.

^{10} After a consonant and before a back vowel.

^{11} After a consonant and before a front vowel.

The following table gives the most common outcomes of Proto-Algonquian clusters, as well as post-consonantal *w and *y. If <?> appears in a table, the outcome is unattested in the literature.

PA	Eastern			Central				Plains		
PA	Massachusett	Delaware	Shawnee	Fox	Menominee	Ojibwe	Cree	Arapaho	Blackfoot	Cheyenne
*ʔt	ʰt	ht	ʔt	ht	qt /ʔt/	t	st	t^{2}	xt, sst^{4}	ʔt
*ʔč	ʰč	hč	ʔč	hč	qc /ʔč/	ch /č/	sc	θ^{2}	?	ʔs
*ʔθ	š	x	ʔθ	s	qn /ʔn/	s, sh /š/^{3}	st	s^{2}	/ʔ/~y~Ø	ʔh
*ʔs	s, ʰs	s	ʔθ	s	qs /ʔs/	s	s	hʔ	?	ʔh
*ʔš	s, š	x	ʔš	s	qs /ʔs/	sh /š/	s	s^{2}	/ʔ/~y~Ø	ʔ
*ʔr	š, n(?)	hl	ʔθ	s	qn /ʔn/	s, sh /š/^{3}	hy	n^{2}	?	ʔh
*hp	?	hp	?	?	hp	p	hp	k; č^{1}	xp, ssp^{4}	hp
*hk	k	h	ʔk	hk	hk	k	hk	Ø	xk, ssk^{4}	hk
*ht	t	ht	ʔt	ht	ht	t	ht	t	?	ht
*hč	?	hč	ʔč	hč	hc /hč/	ch /č/	hc	?	?	s
*hθ	š	x	ʔθ	s	hn	s, sh /š/^{3}	ht	s	sst	h
*hs	s	s	ʔθ	s	hs	s	s	h	ss	h
*hš	?	x	ʔš	š	hs	sh /š/	hs	s	?	x
(*hr)	š	x	ʔθ	s	hn	s, sh /š/^{3}	hy	?	?	h
*Hm		hm		p	m	m	hp	b, w	xp~ʔp, ssp^{4}	m
*mp	p	mp	p	p	hp	mb	hp	k^{2}; č^{1, 2}	ʔp	hp
*nk	k	nk	t	k	hk	ng	hk	ʔ	ʔʔ	hk
*nt	t	nt	k	t	ht	nd	ht	t^{2}	xt, sst^{4}	ht
*nč	č	nč	č	č	hc /hč/	nj /nǯ/	hc	θ^{2}	ʔt	s
*nθ	?	hl	?	?	hn	n, nzh /nž/^{3}	ht	x^{2}; s^{1, 2}	?	h
*ns	s	ns	?	s	hs	nz	s	hʔ	x~s	h
*nš	s	nš	š	š	ns	nzh /nž/	s	x^{2}; s^{1, 2}	?	x
*nr	n	hl	n	n	hn	n, nzh /nž/^{3}	hy	?	s	h
*čp	?	?	?	?	cp /čp/	p	sp	xk; xč^{1}	ʔp	sp
*čk	?	hk	ʔk	hk	ck /čk/	k	šk	?	?	sk
*šp	šp	sp	šp	hp	sp	shp /šp/	sp	xk; xč^{1}	ssp	ʔp
*šk	sk, šk	sk	šk	šk	sk	shk /šk/	sk	x; s^{1}	xk, ssk^{4}	ʔk
(*št)	?	št	št	?	?	sht /št/	st	?	?	ʔt
*θp	sp	xp	ʔp	hp	hp	p	sp	xk	xp~ssp	ʔp
*θk	sk, šk	xk	ʔk	hk	hk	k	sk	x; s^{1}	xk, ssk^{4}	ʔk
*sp	p	hp	ʔp	hp	hp	p	sp	k^{2}; č^{1, 2}	?	ʔp
*sk	k	hk	ʔk	hk	hk	k	sk	ʔ	?	ʔk
*rk	?	hk	šk	šk	hk	sk	hk	ʔ	ʔk	ʔk

^{1} Before front vowels.

^{2} Lengthens a preceding vowel.

^{3} Before *i, *i·, or *y.

^{4} After *i, *#e, *ya, *ke, or between *e(·) and *s

== Vowels ==
Proto-Algonquian is reconstructed as having four vowels with a length distinction, for a grand total of eight vocalic phonemes: *a *e *i *o *ā *ē *ī *ō (these last four occasionally written with a following dot, *a· *e· *i· *o·.) Additionally, there were some postconsonantal or word-initial sequences (such as *we and *ye) which gave rise to vowels in some, but not all, of the daughter Algonquian languages; these will also be treated here.

PA	Eastern			Central				Plains		
PA	Massachusett	Delaware	Shawnee	Fox	Menominee	Ojibwe	Cree	Arapaho	Blackfoot	Cheyenne
*a	a	a	a	a	a	a	a	o	i, a^{3, 8}, o^{9}	o
*e	ə	ə	i^{1}, e	i^{1}, e	ɛ, e^{3, 5, 6}	i	i	e	i, a^{8}, o^{9}	a
*i	i, ə	ī	i	i	e	i	i	i, u^{2}	i, o^{9}	e
*o	o, ə	ō	o	o	o	o	o	i, u^{2}	o	e
*ā	ã:	ā	ā	ā	ā	ā	ā	ō	a, ā^{7}	ó
*ē	ɑ:~ɔ:	ē	ē	ē	ɛ	ē	ē	ē	i	á
*ī	i:	ī	ī	ī	ē, ī^{4}	ī	ī	ī, ū^{2}	i	é
*ō	o:	ō	ō	ō	ō, ū^{4}	ō	ō	ī, ū^{2}	o	é
*ye	yə	yə	i	i	i	i	i	i	i	e
*we	wə	wə	o	o	o	o	o	i	o	o

^{1} In an initial syllable.

^{2} After a syllable containing o, ō (from PA *a, *ā).

^{3} Word-initially.

^{4} When followed later in the word by i, ī, or a postconsonantal glide w or y, unless there is an intervening ɛ or ɛ̄.

^{5} After a syllable with a long vowel in it, unless followed by a cluster whose first member is h or ʔ.

^{6} After a word-initial consonant, unless followed by h or ʔ.

^{7} After semi-vowels.

^{8} Word-finally.

^{9} Before *kw.
