= Native American languages of Wyoming =

Wyoming, a state in the western United States that straddles the intersection of the Rocky Mountains and the Great Plains, had been a part of the traditional geographic expanse of various Native American tribes: the Shoshone, the Arapaho, the Cheyenne, and the Crow. During the era of Westward Expansion in the late nineteenth and early twentieth centuries, the Crow were pushed north to Montana, where there was already a significant population of their tribe, and the Cheyenne were split between Montana and Oklahoma. Only the Shoshone and Arapaho remained in Wyoming, with some of both sent to the Wind River Indian Reservation, and others of both pushed to other western states and Oklahoma, respectively. As such, in total, there are two Native American languages currently spoken in Wyoming: Shoshone and Arapaho.

Population estimates are based on figures from Ethnologue and U.S. Census data, as given in sub-pages below. The two languages are shown in the table below:

Language	Classification	Number of Speakers	Total Ethnic Population	Tribe(s) Included	Location(s) in Wyoming	Significant External Populations
Shoshone	Uto-Aztecan: Numic: Central Numic	2,000	12,300	Eastern Shoshone	Wind River Indian Reservation	Idaho, Utah, Nevada
Arapaho	Algic: Algonquian: Plains Algonquian: Arapahoan	250	9,000	Northern Arapaho	Wind River Indian Reservation	Oklahoma

== See also ==
- Native Americans in the United States
- Plains Indians
- Indigenous languages of the Americas
- Uto-Aztecan languages
- Algonquian languages
