= Nawathinehena language =

Extinct Algonquian language

Nawathinehena
- Nawathi'nehena, nawaθiʔnehena
- Native to: United States
- Region: Oklahoma
- Ethnicity: Nawathi'neha/Southern Arapaho
- Era: attested 1899
- Language family: Algic: Algonquian; Arapahoan; Nawathinehena

Language codes
- ISO 639-3: nwa
- Glottolog: nawa1259

Nawathinehena is an extinct Algonquian language formerly spoken among the Arapaho. It had a phonological development quite different from either Gros Ventre or Arapaho proper. It has been identified as the former language of the Southern Arapaho, who switched to speaking Arapaho proper in the 19th century. However, the language is not well attested, being documented only in a vocabulary collected in 1899 by Alfred L. Kroeber from the Oklahoma Arapaho.

== Phonology ==
While it shares many important phonological innovations with Arapaho, it presents the merger of *r, *θ and *s with *t as t instead of n as in Arapaho, a sound change reminiscent of Blackfoot and Cheyenne. PA *w changes to m instead of merging with *r, *s and *n as n.

== Vocabulary ==
Some numbers of the Nawathinehena language:

Numbers
Nawathinehena	English
tcäⁿcinaha’	one
nīsähä’	two
nahaha	three
niabaha’	four
niotanähä’	five
neixθioti	six
nīciotaⁿ	seven
nexiotähähäⁿ	eight
cioxtähähäⁿ	nine
maxtoxtanähäⁿ	ten

== Notes ==
=== Works cited ===
- Goddard, Ives (1974). "An Outline of the Historical Phonology of Arapaho and Atsina". International Journal of American Linguistics. 40 (2): 102–16. doi:10.1086/465292. S2CID 144253507.
- Jacques, Guillaume (2013). "The sound change s>n in Arapaho". Folia Linguistica Historica. 34: 43–57. doi:10.1515/flih.2013.002.

=== General references ===
- Mithun, Marianne (1999). The Languages of Native North America. Cambridge Language Surveys. Cambridge: Cambridge University Press.
