= Central Algonquian languages =

Language subgroup

Central Algonquian
- (areal)
- Geographic distribution: North America
- Linguistic classification: Algic: Algonquian; Central Algonquian
- Subdivisions: Ojibwe–Potawatomi; Cree; Fox-Sauk-Kickapoo; Menominee; Miami–Illinois; Shawnee

Language codes
- Glottolog: None cree1271 Cree-Innu-Naskapi east2765 Eastern Great Lakes Algonquian meno1252 Menominee

The Central Algonquian languages are commonly grouped together as a subgroup of the larger Algonquian family, itself a member of the Algic family. Though the grouping is often encountered in the literature, it is an areal grouping, not a genetic grouping. In other words, the languages are grouped together because they were spoken near one another, not because they are more closely related to one another than to other Algonquian languages. Within the Algonquian family, only Eastern Algonquian is a valid genealogical group.

Within the Central Algonquian grouping, Potawatomi and Ojibwe, also known as Chippewa, are closely related and are generally grouped together as an Ojibwa-Potawatomi sub-branch. "Eastern Great Lakes" was first proposed by Richard Rhodes in 1988, and first discussed by Ives Goddard as "Core Central" in 1994. In Goddard's assessment, he divides the "Core Central" into the Ojibwa-Potawatomi and Miami–Illinois group, and the Sauk-Fox-Kickapoo and Shawnee group; the hypothesis for the subgroup was based on lexical and phonological innovations. David J. Costa in his 2003 book The Miami-Illinois Language agrees with Rhodes and Goddard that Central Algonquian has a specific language sub-branch that he refers to as "Eastern Great Lakes" but in his assessment Costa also states "...there seems to be no evidence that Miami-Illinois is closer to Ojibwe-Potawatomi than it is to Sauk-Fox-Kickapoo."

== Family division ==
The languages are listed below along with dialects and subdialects. This classification follows Goddard (1996) and Mithun (1999).

- Central Algonquian
  - Cree–Innu (also known as Cree–Innu–Naskapi)
    - Cree
      - Plains Cree
      - Woods Cree
      - Western Swampy Cree
      - Eastern Swampy Cree and Moose Cree
      - Atikamekw (also known as Attikamek, Attikamekw, Atikamek or Tête de Boule)
    - Innu–Naskapi
      - East Cree (also known as James Bay Cree or Eastern Cree)
        - Northern East Cree
        - Southern East Cree
      - Naskapi
      - Innu (also known as Innu-aimun or Montagnais)
  - Menominee (also known as Menomini)
  - ? Eastern Great Lakes (also known as Core Central)
    - Ojibwe–Potawatomi (also known as Ojibwe–Potawatomi–Ottawa, Anishinaabemowin, or the Anishinaabe language)
      - Ojibwe (also known as Ojibwa, Ojibway, Ojibwe–Ottawa, Ojibwemowin or the Anishinaabe language)
        - Northern
          - Algonquin
          - Oji-Cree (also known as Severn Ojibwe, Anishininiimowin or the Anishinini language)
        - Southern
          - Saulteaux (also known as Nakawēmowin, Plains Ojibwe or Western Ojibwe)
          - Eastern Ojibwe (also known as Mississauga Ojibwa or Jibwemwin)
          - Southwestern Ojibwe (also known as Chippewa, Ojibwe, Ojibwa, Ojibwemowin or Ojibway)
          - Ottawa (also known as Odawa or Daawaamwin)
          - Northern Ojibwe (also known as Northwestern Ojibwe)
          - Nipissing Algonquin (also known simply as Algonquin)
      - Potawatomi
    - Fox (also known as Fox-Sauk-Kickapoo or Mesquakie-Sauk-Kickapoo)
      - Meskwaki (also known as Fox, Mesquakie, or Meshkwahkihaki)
      - Sauk (also known as Sac or Thakiwaki)
      - Kickapoo
      - Mascouten (unattested)
    - Shawnee
    - Miami–Illinois
      - Miami
      - Illinois
      - Peoria
      - Wea

== See also ==
- Proto-Algonquian language
- Algonquian peoples

== Bibliography ==
- Campbell, Lyle (1997). American Indian languages: The historical linguistics of Native America. New York: Oxford University Press. ISBN 0-19-509427-1.
- Goddard, Ives (1994). "The West-to-East Cline in Algonquian Dialectology." In William Cowan, ed., Papers of the 25th Algonquian Conference 187-211. Ottawa: Carleton University.
- ———— (1996). "Introduction". In Ives Goddard, ed., "Languages". Vol. 17 of William Sturtevant, ed., The Handbook of North American Indians. Washington, D.C.: The Smithsonian Institution.
- Mithun, Marianne (1999). The languages of Native North America. Cambridge: Cambridge University Press. ISBN 0-521-23228-7 (hbk); ISBN 0-521-29875-X.
