= Proto-Algonquian language =

Reconstructed ancestor of the Algonquian languages

Proto-Algonquian
- PA
- Reconstruction of: Algonquian languages
- Region: western North America
- Era: 1000–500 BCE
- Reconstructed ancestor: Proto-Algic

Proto-Algonquian (commonly abbreviated PA) is the proto-language from which the various Algonquian languages are descended. It is generally estimated to have been spoken around 2,500 to 3,000 years ago, but there is less agreement on where it was spoken. The Algonquian family, which is a branch of the larger Algic language family, is usually divided into three subgroups: Eastern Algonquian, which is a genetic subgroup spoken in and around New England and the Chesapeake Bay; Central Algonquian, spoken around the Great Lakes in both the United States and Canada; and Plains Algonquian, spoken in the Great Plains of both the United States and Canada. Both Central and Plains Algonquian languages are areal groupings. In the historical linguistics of North America, Proto-Algonquian is one of the best studied and most thoroughly reconstructed proto-languages. It is descended from Proto-Algic.

== History of research ==
Most Algonquian languages are similar enough that their relatedness has been recognized for centuries and was commented on by the early English and French colonists and explorers. For example, in 1787 (over a decade before Sir William Jones' famous speech on Indo-European), the theologian and linguist Jonathan Edwards Jr. deduced that the Algonquian languages of the eastern and central United States were "radically the same" (meaning having a common 'root'), and contrasted them with the neighboring Iroquoian languages. The earliest work on reconstructing the Algonquian proto-language was undertaken by the linguists Truman Michelson and Leonard Bloomfield. In 1925 Bloomfield reconstructed what he called "Primitive Central Algonquian", using what were at the time the four best-attested Algonquian languages: Fox, Ojibwe, Menominee, and Plains Cree. Following his initial reconstructions, investigations of other languages revealed that his "Primitive Central Algonquian" was essentially equivalent to Proto-Algonquian. Bloomfield wrote a refinement and expansion of his reconstruction in 1946, and his two papers remain the starting point for all research and reconstructions of Proto-Algonquian. In the years since there has been an enormous amount of comparative work undertaken on the Algonquian family.

== Urheimat ==
There remains some disagreement over the Algonquian Urheimat (the homeland of a protolanguage). The initial theory, first put forth by Frank T. Siebert, Jr. in 1967 based on examining of the ranges of numerous species of plants and animals for which reliable Algonquian cognates existed, holds that Proto-Algonquian was spoken between Lake Huron's Georgian Bay and Lake Ontario, in Ontario, Canada, and at least as far south as Niagara Falls. Research a generation later suggests that in fact it was spoken farther west than this, perhaps "somewhere immediately west of Lake Superior" or on the Columbia Plateau.

== Phonology ==
=== Vowels ===
	Front		Central		Back	
	short	long	short	long	short	long
Close	*i	*i·				
Mid	*e	*e·			*o	*o·
Open			*a	*a·		

The same inventory of eight vowels was found in Proto-Algic, but Proto-Algonquian did not inherit its inventory directly from Proto-Algic. Rather, several sound changes left pre-Proto-Algonquian without short *i and *o. It is not clear that they had redeveloped by the time of Proto-Algonquian. All instances in which Bloomfield reconstructed *o can now be reconstructed as *we based on evidence from some of the Eastern languages (for example, Bloomfield's *nekotwi "one" is now reconstructed as *nekwetwi based on forms like Munsee nkwúti). There are still a handful of instances where *o can be reconstructed, usually as the result of a morphophonological process of vowel shortening. Goddard concludes that "an independent phoneme *o is of no great antiquity in Proto-Algonquian", but recommends continuing to use it in reconstructions. Likewise, Berman states that "PA *i is probably also of recent origin", derived from earlier (pre-Proto-Algonquian) *ye sequences and morphophonological shortening.

=== Consonants ===
Proto-Algonquian had a smaller number of consonants than Proto-Algic. The reconstructed consonants are as follows (given in the Americanist phonetic notation common in the literature):

	Labial	Alveolar		Palatal (-alveolar)	Velar	Glottal
	Labial	median	lateral (?)	Palatal (-alveolar)	Velar	Glottal
Occlusive	*p	*t		*č	*k	
Fricative		*s	*θ or *ł	*š		*h
Sonorant	*m	*n	*r or *l	*y	*w	

The phoneme given in the table as ⟨r⟩ was reconstructed by Bloomfield as *l, but Goddard has more recently argued that it should be reconstructed as *r, largely because the earliest attestations of the majority of languages show some sort of rhotic as its reflex, which in many languages subsequently changed to a lateral within the historical period. The precise pronunciation of the phoneme written ⟨θ⟩ is unknown. It has merged with the reflex of *r in all Algonquian languages except for Cree and the Arapahoan languages. Leonard Bloomfield originally suggested that it could have been either an interdental fricative or a lateral fricative. One piece of evidence for the interdental fricative is that this is the reflex it has in Arapaho. However, other researchers have argued for its reconstruction as a lateral fricative, */ɬ/, in part because of the aforementioned merger in most languages with the phoneme traditionally reconstructed as *l.

As with *i and *o, it is unclear whether *č was an independent phoneme in Proto-Algonquian. Almost all instances where *č is reconstructed are before *i, *i·, or *y, where it does not contrast with *t (see below), or are cases of diminutive consonant symbolism. However, Goddard recommends continuing to write it in reconstructions, since it seems to have been present in the clusters *čp and *čk; since it can be reconstructed before *a in the term *čapo·nk- "splash"; and since *t does appear before *i· in some reconstructions of the onomatopoeic noun ti·nti·wa "blue jay" (however, see Wiktionary for more).

=== Clusters ===
Reconstruction of the consonant clusters has been relatively difficult, and the paths the clusters take in their evolutions to the daughter languages have been complex. The current view is that the permissible consonant clusters were (first member on the left, second member across the top):

Proto-Algonquian Consonant Clusters
	p	k	t	č	θ	s	š	r	m
ʔ			*ʔt	*ʔč	*ʔθ	*ʔs	*ʔš	*ʔr	*Hm
h	*hp	*hk	*ht	*hč	*hθ	*hs	*hš	(*hr)	*Hm
N	*mp	*nk	*nt	*nč	*nθ	*ns	*nš	*nr	
č	*čp	*čk							
š	*šp	*šk	(*št)						
θ	*θp	*θk							
x	*xp	*xk							
ç	*çp	*çk							

In several cases the actual phonetic identity of the first member of the clusters was unknown, and Bloomfield's choice of symbols to represent them was purely arbitrary. Thus, ⟨x⟩ does not represent *[x], ⟨ç⟩ does not represent *[ç], and ⟨ʔ⟩ does not necessarily represent *[ʔ]. Goddard argues that Bloomfield's arbitrary symbol ⟨x⟩ be reconstructed as *s, and Bloomfield's ⟨ç⟩ be reconstructed as *r. While a glottal stop phoneme is not otherwise reconstructed, given that Bloomfield's ⟨ʔ⟩ in clusters seems to represent the neutralization of *p and *k and its realization in Menominee and Cheyenne is a glottal stop, it probably was indeed phonetically [ʔ]. The cluster written ⟨Hm⟩ shows up as p or m in most of the daughter languages, but as hm in Munsee (for example, PA *wi·kiwa·Hmi "house" becomes Ojibwe wiigiwaam, Fox wîkiyâpi, and Munsee wíikwahm). The first member of the cluster may have been either *h or *ʔ.

The clusters *št and *hr are each reconstructed on the basis of only a single correspondence set (*št in *weštikwa·ni, "his/her head"; and *hr in *re·hre·wa, "s/he breathes") and may not have been part of Proto-Algonquian. David Pentland, for example, argued that Ojibwe oshtigwaan, claimed as the only form requiring the reconstruction of *št, is a borrowing from Cree. However, evidence from Munsee and Blackfoot seem to also point toward *št as a valid separate cluster in PA (Munsee wìilùshtíikan, Blackfoot moʼtokááni, "head, hair").

Finally, all consonants and consonant clusters could be followed by *w or *y (although the sequences *čw and *hy did not occur; and *t and *θ were regularly replaced before *y, for which see below).

=== Phonological processes ===
Several allophonic processes, morphophonemic processes, and phonological constraints can be reconstructed. Among the most significant of these processes was that *t and *θ became *č and *š respectively before *i, *i·, and *y. For example, the initial *went- "from there" (as in *wentenamwa "s/he takes it from there") is realized as *wenč- in the word *wenči·wa "s/he comes from there", since it precedes *i·.

There were several restrictions on phonotactics and the shape of the PA word that can be reconstructed. All words began with a single consonant (other than *h) or vowel, or with a consonant plus *w or *y; there were no sequences of consecutive vowels; and the word always ended in a short vowel. The vowels *i and *o never occurred in initial syllables. A sequence of consonant+semivowel could not be followed by *o or *o·. There was also a restriction which prevented two-syllable nouns from ending in a sequence of short vowel + consonant + short vowel.

In most cases, when the pronominal prefixes *ne- (first person), *ke- (second person), and *we- (third person) were added to a vowel-initial stem, an epenthetic *-t- was inserted between the prefix and the stem. Thus, the prefixes became *net-, *ket-, and *wet- respectively. For example, *ne- + *-ehkwa- = *netehkwa- "my louse". This feature goes back to Proto-Algic (compare Wiyot du- + híkw = dutíkw "my louse"). There were a handful of irregular exceptions to this pattern, however. For example, the prefixes lost their vowels before several kinship terms, as in *ne- + *-o·hkomehsa = *no·hkomehsa "my grandmother."

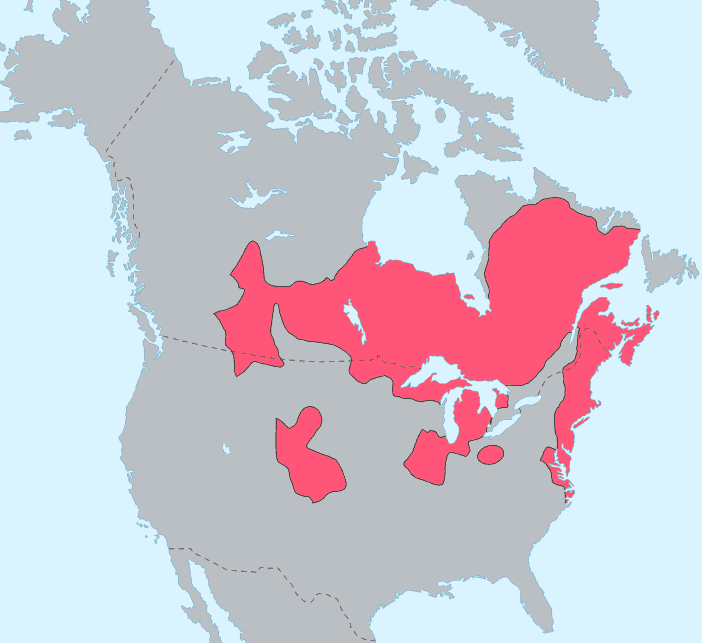
Approximate distribution of the Algonquian languages when first encountered by Europeans

Several rules for internal sandhi in morpheme combinations can be reconstructed. The most basic was the insertion of a "connective i" between two consonants. For example, *po·n- "cease" + *-m "act by speech on an animate object" = *po·nime·wa "s/he stops talking to him/her." In a few idiosyncratic cases, however, this rule did not operate, and instead the consonants were changed in various ways. For instance, the combination θ+p produced when the root *eθ- "thither, thus" was added to the final *-pahto· "run" simplified to *xp: *expahta·wa "s/he runs thither." One regular exception to the "connective i" rule was when the conjunct suffix *-ki was added to a verb stem ending in a consonant, for example *ki·šekat- "be day" + *-ki = *ki·šekaxki "when it is day." Note that Bloomfield here actually reconstructed this word as *ki·šekaθki, but evidence from other Algonquian languages has shown that the cluster should be reconstructed as *xk. When two vowels became contiguous, if one was a long vowel and one was short, the short vowel dropped: *naka·- "stop" + *-en "by hand" = *naka·ne·wa "s/he stops him/her by hand." If both were long, an epenthetic *y was inserted between the two.

== Grammar ==
Proto-Algonquian nouns had an animate/inanimate contrast: nouns representing animate beings (and some traditional items viewed as having spiritual powers) were classed as animate, while all other nouns were inanimate. The plural marker differed in form depending on whether the noun was animate or inanimate: animate nouns took a plural suffix *-aki, while inanimate nouns took a plural suffix *-ari. Another important distinction involved the contrast between nouns marked as proximate and those marked as obviative. Proximate nouns were those deemed most central or important to the discourse, while obviative nouns were those less important to the discourse. When two third person participants appeared in a sentence, one was marked as proximate and the other as obviative, in order to distinguish which one was the subject and which was the object (since verbs inflected for whether they had a proximate or obviative subject and a proximate or obviative object). In a given stretch of discourse, there will not be two proximate or two obviative participants.

There were personal pronouns which distinguished three persons, two numbers (singular and plural), inclusive and exclusive first person plural, and proximate and obviative third persons. Demonstrative pronouns have been more difficult to reconstruct, as many of the daughter languages have innovated a great deal.

PA had four classes of verbs: transitive verbs with an animate object (abbreviated TA), transitive verbs with an inanimate object (TI), intransitive verbs with an animate subject (AI), and intransitive verbs with an inanimate subject (II). Transitive verbs had two paradigms, termed objective and absolute. Objective verbs were used when the object of the verb was not present as an overt noun elsewhere in the sentence, while absolute verbs were used when the object of the verb was marked with an overt noun in the sentence. Objective verbs could also be used when an object was present, and in such cases indicated that the object was definite, as opposed to indefinite.

== See also ==
- Algonquian languages
  - Plains Algonquian languages
  - Central Algonquian languages
  - Eastern Algonquian languages
- Algic languages
- Algonquian sound laws
