= Menominee language =

Algonquian language

Menominee
- omāēqnomenēweqnaesen
- Pronunciation: [omæːʔnomeneːweʔnæsen]
- Native to: United States
- Region: Northeastern Wisconsin
- Ethnicity: 800 Menominee (2000 census)
- Native speakers: 35 (2007); 25 L2 speakers (no date)
- Language family: Algic: Algonquian; Menominee

Official status
- Regulated by: Menominee Language & Culture Commission

Language codes
- ISO 639-3: mez
- Glottolog: meno1252
- ELP: Menominee
- Menominee is classified as Critically Endangered by the UNESCO Atlas of the World's Languages in Danger.

Menominee (/mɪˈnɒmɪniː/ mih-NOM-ih-nee), also spelled Menomini (endonym: omāēqnomenēweqnaesen) is a critically endangered Algonquian language spoken by the Menominee people of what is now northern Wisconsin in the United States. The federally recognized tribe has been working to encourage revival of use of the language by intensive classes locally and partnerships with universities. Most of the fluent speakers are elderly. Many of the people use English as their first language.

The name of the tribe, and the language, derived from Oma͞eqnomenew, comes from the word for 'wild rice'. The tribe has gathered and cultivated this native food as a staple for millennia. The Ojibwa, their neighbors to the north who are one of the Anishinaabe peoples and also speak an Algonquian language, also use this term for them. The language is called omāēqnomenēweqnaesen but also omāēqnomenēweqnaesewen or omāēqnomenēw kīketwan

The main characteristics of Menominee, as compared to other Algonquian languages, are its extensive use of the low front vowel /æ/, its rich negation morphology, and its lexicon. Some scholars (notably Bloomfield and Sapir) have classified it as a Central Algonquian language based on its phonology.

Good sources of information on the Menominee tribe and their language include Leonard Bloomfield's 1928 bilingual text collection, his 1962 grammar (considered a landmark study), and Skinner's earlier anthropological work.

== Usage and revitalization efforts ==
Menominee is a highly endangered language, as there are only a handful of fluent speakers left. According to a 1997 report by the Menominee Historic Preservation Office, 39 people spoke Menominee as their first language, all of whom were elderly; 26 spoke it as their second language; and 65 others had learned some of it for the purpose of understanding the language and/or teaching it to others.

The Menominee Language & Culture Commission was established by the Menominee Nation to promote the continued use of the language. In the 21st century, residents of the Menominee reservation at Keshena have held intensive classes for learners of all ages, and have worked with linguists from the University of Wisconsin–Madison to document the language and to develop curriculum and learning materials. A Menominee dictionary project, led by Monica Macaulay, has resulted in the publication of modern dictionaries of the language in support of revitalization efforts.

In 1977, Menominee High School, founded when "the Indians of the Menominee Reservation separated from the Shawano-Gresham School District to open their own district", began to offer Menominee language, drumming, and tribal dance in addition to its academic program.

Classes in the Menominee language are available locally at preschool, high school and adult levels, and at the College of Menominee Nation and University of Wisconsin–Green Bay.

In 2012, the Catholic Diocese of Green Bay issued an apology to "a seventh-grader who was punished after using her native Menominee language in the classroom" in Shawano, Wisconsin.

As of 2013, there are "six or seven people ... able to be conversational in the language", according to an article on the Menominee Place Names Map, a collaborative project at the University of Wisconsin–Stevens Point.

== Orthography and phonology ==
Below are the basic orthography and phonemes (represented in IPA) of Menominee.

=== Consonants ===
	Labial	Alveolar	Post-alveolar/ Palatal	Velar	Glottal
Nasal	m ⟨m⟩	n ⟨n⟩			
Plosive/Affricate	p ⟨p⟩	t ⟨t⟩	t͡ʃ ⟨c⟩	k ⟨k⟩	ʔ ⟨q⟩
Fricative		s~ʃ ⟨s⟩			h ⟨h⟩
Approximant			j ⟨y⟩	w ⟨w⟩	

- /t/ is postdental.
- The unvoiced sibilant /s/ can range between [s] and [ʃ].
- /h/ and /ʔ/ do not appear initially, except sometimes as the on-glide of a vowel. Final /h/ after /i/ is sometimes dropped and sometimes replaced with /j/, as in pih 'paddle'.

Consonants are palatalized before front vowels and labialized before back vowels.

Menominee does not make contrasts between voiced and voiceless stops and voicing from a following vowel may set in before the opening is complete.

=== Vowels ===
Monophthongs
	Front		Central	Back	
	short	long	short	short	long
Close	i ⟨i⟩	iː ⟨ī⟩		u ⟨u⟩	uː ⟨ū⟩
Mid	ɪ~e ⟨e⟩	eː ⟨ē⟩	(ə ⟨ö⟩)	o ⟨o⟩	oː ⟨ō⟩
Open	ɪ~ɛ~æ ⟨ae⟩	ɛː~æː ⟨a͞e⟩	a ⟨a⟩		aː ⟨ā⟩

Diphthongs
Long	Short
ia ⟨ia⟩	ja ⟨ya⟩
ua ⟨ua⟩	wa ⟨wa⟩

- Long /æː/ or /ɛː/ is labialized if the preceding syllable contains a back vowel or when it is followed by a palatalized consonant. The same is true for /eː/
- Short /æ/ /ɛ/ is particularly open when found before ⟨h⟩ and ⟨q⟩.
- /o/ is consistently lengthened before /w/.
- /ia/ and /ua/ are treated like long vowels in the assignment of stress. They contrast with /ja/ and /wa/. For example, uah ('he uses it') is distinct from wāh ('fish egg'). Final /w/ after /i/ becomes primarily bilabial. The syllable /wa/ can alternate with /o/ for some speakers.
- /ɪ~æ~ɛ/ & /æː~ɛː/, which are usually written ⟨ae a͞e⟩, can also be written as ⟨æ ǣ⟩ particularly in handwritten text

Vowels are slightly nasalized before or after /m/ or /n/.

=== Syllable structure and stress ===
Syllable structure in Menominee is typically VC(C) or C(C)VC(C); syllables do not end in vowels. Any consonant can begin or end a syllable except ⟨h⟩ and ⟨q⟩. The only clusters which can occur at the end of a syllable are ⟨qc⟩ and ⟨qs⟩. The only cluster which can begin a syllable is ⟨kw⟩.

Primary stress occurs on every long vowel or diphthong that is in the next-to-last syllable of a word. Most compounds and inflected forms are treated as single words in assigning stress. Rhetorical stress comes on the last syllable.

=== Pitch ===
In an interrogative sentence which uses a question word, there is a rising and then falling of pitch near the beginning and a drop at the end. In yes–no questions, there is a sharp rise in pitch at the end of the sentence. The modulations of pitch for expressing exclamations, quotations, etc. is generally much more pronounced in Menominee than in English.

== Grammar ==
=== Lexical categories ===
Bloomfield states there are five overarching categories in Menominee: noun, pronoun, negator, verb, and particle. Nouns, pronouns, negators, and verbs all take inflection whereas particles do not carry any morphology.

=== Agreement ===
Agreement morphology in Menominee can be fusional, e.g. animacy and number (nouns), are indicated within the same affix.

==== Animacy ====
All nouns are split into two categories and are inflected for animacy and are classified as either animate or inanimate. Animacy in Menominee is a grammatical construct for noun classification and not a reflection of the noun's status as "living" or "non-living." Therefore, some semantically inherently inanimate objects are grammatically animate.

==== Number ====
All nouns are required to be inflected if they are plural. Nouns which are singular are unmarked.

==== Person marking ====
Menominee has four grammatical persons: first, second, third, and indefinite.

=== Nouns ===
==== Agreement morphology ====
Noun classes are split based on grammatical gender into two categories: animate and inanimate. Additionally, all nouns must be marked for plurality. Plurality agreement are suffixes that attach to noun stems. Singular forms are unmarked (represented by zero morpheme ∅) and plural has two forms, as shown in the table below.

	Inanimate	Animate
Singular	-∅	
Plural	-an	-ak

These suffixes are attached directly to noun stems or to possessed themes. Examples below show singular and plural inflections of both animate and inanimate nouns:

	Stem	Singular	Plural
Inanimate	we:kewam- 'house'	we:kewam-∅ → we:kewam	we:kewam-an → we:kewaman
Inanimate	wa:wanw- 'egg'	wa:wanw-∅ → wa:wan	wa:wanw-an → wa:wanon
Animate	ɛnɛ:niw- 'man'	enɛ:niw-∅ → enɛ:niw	enɛ:niw-ak → enɛ:niwak
Animate	mɛtɛmohs- 'woman'	metɛ:mohs-∅ → metɛ:moh	metɛ:mohs-ak → metɛ:mohsak

There are four personal prefixes used to modify nouns and in personal pronouns:

- 1st person: nɛ-
- 2nd person: kɛ- (also used for inclusive 1st person plural)
- 3rd person: o-
- indefinite: mɛ-

Certain nouns occur only in possessed forms, typically referring to body parts or relatives, such as okiːqsemaw, 'son'; kese:t, 'your (s.) foot'; mese:t, 'someone's foot'. These affixes are used to indicate possession (e.g. neme:h 'my older sister'; neta:qsɛnem, 'my stone'). They are also used in the inflection of verbs to indicate the actor.

The personal pronouns formed by these prefixes are as follows:

	Singular	Plural
1st	nenah- 'I'	nenaq- '(exclusive) we'
1st	nenah- 'I'	kenaq- '(inclusive) we'
2nd	kenah- 'you'	kenuaq- 'you (plural)'
3rd	wenah- 'he/she/it'	wenuaq- 'they'

Nouns and nearly all pronouns are inflected for singular and plural. Some nouns occur only as singulars, typically denoting liquids or other uncountable substances (e.g. kahpeːh, 'coffee'). The singular is often used for a representative meaning, e.g. ɛːsespemaːteset omɛːqnomeneːw, 'the way the Menomini lives'.

Nouns can also be inflected for locality:

- weːkewam, 'house'
- weːkewameh, 'in a house'
- yoːm, 'this'
- yoːs, 'right here'

Diminutives can be formed from any noun by suffixing -aeshs.

Agent nouns (i.e., nouns that mean one who does the action of the verb, such as worker from work, talker from talk, in English) are homonymous with the third person inflected verb. So,

- anohkiːw, 'he works' or 'worker'
- moːhkotaːqsow, 'he whittles' or 'carpenter'

=== Verbs ===
Menominee displays inflectional reference. Nouns, verbs, and objects are inflected to agree in gender, person, and number of their possessor, actor, or transitive verb, respectively.

Intransitive verbs typically occur in two forms: one for animate actors, the other for inanimate actors:

- paːpɛhcen, 'he falls'
- paːpɛhnɛn, 'it falls'

Transitive verbs can be used with either animate or inanimate actors. Transitive verbs contain inflectional reference both to their subject and to the object. One form of the verb exists for animate objects and another for inanimate objects:

- koqnɛw, 'he fears him'
- koqtam, 'he fears it'

Impersonal verbs occur with no identifiable actor and in the singular inflection:

- kɛqsiw, 'it is cold'
- kemeːwan, 'it is raining'

The negator kan typically precedes the verb: kan kemeːwanon, 'it is not raining'. The negator also inflects for certain elements of modal inflection: kasaq kemeːwanon, 'why, it isn't raining anymore!' It can be used alone to answer a yes–no question. The particle poːn is used to negate imperatives: poːn kasɛːhkehseh, 'don't be too late'.

Bloomfield distinguishes five modes of the verb in Menominee, which are reflected in the verb, negator, personal and demonstrative pronouns, and auxiliary verbs:

- Indicative: piːw, 'he comes'

The indicative makes statements. In the first-person plural, it is used as a hortatory (first person plural imperative: kenawmaːciaq, 'let's set out'

- Quotative: piːwen, 'it is said that he comes'
  - The quotative typically ends in -en and is used when the speaker is stating something learned from another person or from a dream or vision. It is the mode used in traditional narrative.
- Interrogative: piːq, 'is he coming?'
  - The interrogative is used for yes–no questions.
- Present: piasah, 'so he is coming'
  - The present mode, typically ending in -esa or -sa, puts an emphasis on the fact that the event is taking place in the present, as opposed to the past or in contrast with expectation.
- Preterit: piapah, 'he did formerly come'
  - The preterit, typically ending in -epa or -pa, puts an emphasis on the fact that the event took place in the past, as opposed to in the present or in contrast with expectation.

== Language family ==
Menominee is one of the Algonquian languages, which are part of the larger family of Algic languages. Goddard (1996) and Mithun (1999) classify it with the Central and Plains Algonquian languages along with languages like Blackfoot, Arapaho, Cheyenne, the Cree languages, and Eastern Great Lakes languages like Ojibwe.

== Works cited ==
- Bloomfield, Leonard (1962). The Menomini language. New Haven: Yale University Press.
