= Jean-André Cuoq =

French philologist

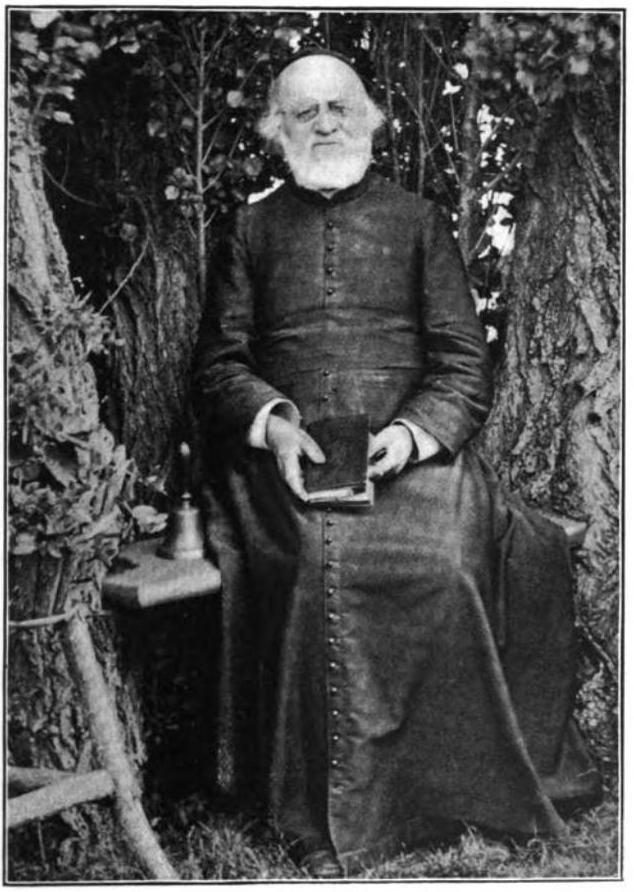
L'Abbé Jean-André Cuoq, c. 1895.

Jean-André Cuoq (1821–1898) was a Roman Catholic priest and a philologist in the Algonquin and Mohawk languages.

== Early life ==
Jean-André Cuoq was born on June 6, 1821, to Jean-Pierre Cuoq and Rosalie Desholme, in Le Puy-en-Velay, France. He entered the Company of Saint-Sulpice in Paris in 1844. He was ordained as a priest in the Order of Saint-Sulpice in December 1845. He was sent to Quebec, Canada, on November 29, 1846. He was then sent to the mission of the Lac des Deux-Montagnes (Oka, Quebec) in 1847 as a missionary to the Nipissings.

== Later life ==
Cuoq remained in Oka for many years as a companion of Fr. Nicolas Dufresne (1789–1863), who was the director of that mission and missionary to the Mohawks. Cuoq at first studied Nipissing, but after Fr. Dufresne was withdrawn from the mission in 1857 and sent to a seminary in Montreal, Cuoq applied himself in studying the Mohawk language. In 1864, Cuoq was sent to Collège de Montréal, where he was charged with a class, remaining there two to three years, until he returned to Lac des Deux-Montagnes, where he remained until 1875. He was then attached to the parochial church of Notre Dame at Montreal, remaining there several years until he returned to the Lac des Deux-Montagnes about 1885. Due to his missionary work he was named by the Algonquins (Nipissings) Nìj-Kwenàtc-anìbìc, meaning "double beautiful leaf" or "second Bellefeuille", and by the Iroquois (Mohawks) Orakwanen-takon, meaning "fixed star," probably because of the immobility of his left eye which had been damaged by an accident in his youth. His numerous works, all published in Montreal, gained him admission to many scientific societies of Europe and America. Cuoq died in Oka, Quebec, 1898. The former Cuoq Township of Bas-Saint-Laurent, now part of Matane Regional County Municipality, Quebec, was named in his honour.

== Published works ==
- Cuoq, J. A. Le Livre de la prière; Recueil de Prière, d'Hymnes et de Cantiques chantés à l'église. (in Algonquin) (Montréal: John Lowell, 1852).
- Cuoq, J. A. Catéchisme et Cantiques. (in Algonquin) (Montréal: John Lowell, 1854).
- Cuoq, J. A. and "Le Ciel." De Riligieuse Narration. Le Livre, ou Histoire de la Religion; Résumé de l'histoire de l'Ancien Testament. (in Algonquin) (Montréal: J. Lowell, 1859).
- Cuoq, J. A. Kaiatonserase ou Vade-mecum ou Chantre Iroquois. (in Mohawk)(Tiotaki [Montréal]: John Lovell, 1860).
- Mathevet, Jean Claude. (J. A. Cuoq and J. Tallet, editors). Vie de Notre-Seigneur. (in Algonquin) (Montréal: J. Valois, 1861).
- Cuoq, J. A. Le Libre des sept Nations, ou Paroissien Iroquois noté en plain-chant, avec quelques Cantiques algonquins. (Montréal: J. Lowell, 1861).
- Cuoq, J. A. Jugement erroné de M. Ernest Renan sur les langues sauvages. (Montréal: Eusèbe Sénécal, 1864)(Reprint: Montréal: Dawson, Brothers J.-B. Roland et Fils, 1869).
- Cuoq, J. A. Ienenrinekenstha Kanesatakeha: ou Processional Iroquois à l'usage de la Mission du Lac des Deux Montagnes. (in Mohawk)(Tiotaki [Montréal]: John Lovell, 1864).
- Cuoq, J. A. Catechisme algonquin avec syllabaire et cantiques: Nìina aïamie kakȣedjindiȣinimasinaigan àte gaïe aïamie nikamonan. (in Algonquin)(Kanactàgeng [Montréal (Lac des Deux Montangnes)]: John Lovell, 1865).
- Cuoq, J. A. Études philologiques sur quelques langues sauvages de l'Amerique. (Montréal: Dawson, Brothers, 1866).
- Cuoq, J. A. "Quels étaient les sauvages que rencontra Jacques Cartier sur les rives du Saint-Laurent?" in Annales de philosophie chrétienne. (September, 1869).
- Cuoq, J. A. Lexique de la langue Iroquoise, avec Notes et Appendices. (Montréal: J Chapleau et fils, 1882).
- Cuoq, J. A. Lexique de la langue Algonquine. (Montréal: J Chapleau et fils, 1886).
- Cuoq, J. A. "Grammaire de la langue Algonquine" in Proceedings and transactions of the Royal Society of Canada: Déliberations et mémoires de la Société royale du Canada. (Ottawa: Royal Society of Canada, Part 1: 1891; Part 2: 1892).
- Cuoq, J. A. "Anòtc Kekòn" in Proceedings and transactions of the Royal Society of Canada: Déliberations et mémoires de la Société royale du Canada. (Ottawa: Royal Society of Canada, 1893).
- Cuoq, J. A. and J. Tallet. Nouveau Manuel algonquin. (Montréal: J. Valois, 1893).
- Cuoq, J. A. Le saint Rosaire. (Montréal: Beauchemin, [n.d.])

He wrote also many other works destined to further the Christianization of Native Americans.
