= Arapahoan languages =

Language

Arapahoan
- Araphoic
- Geographic distribution: United States
- Linguistic classification: Algic: Algonquian; Algonquian proper; Arapahoan
- Subdivisions: Arapaho–Gros Ventre; Nawathinehena

Language codes
- Glottolog: arap1273

The Arapahoan languages are a subgroup of the Plains group of Algonquian languages: Nawathinehena, Arapaho, and Gros Ventre.

Nawathinehena and Gros Ventre are extinct and Arapaho is endangered.

Besawunena, attested only from a word list collected by Kroeber, differs only slightly from Arapaho, but a few of its sound changes resemble those seen in Gros Ventre. It had speakers among the Northern Arapaho as recently as the late 1920s.

Nawathinehena is also attested only from a word list collected by Kroeber, and was the most divergent language of the group.

Another reported Arapahoan variety is the extinct Ha'anahawunena, but there is no documentation of it.

== Classification ==
The Glottolog database classifies the Arapahoan languages as follows:

- Arapahoic
  - Arapaho–Gros Ventre–Besawunena
    - Arapaho
    - Gros Ventre
  - Nawathinehena
