= Algonquian languages =

Subfamily of the Algic languages of North America

Algonquian
- Algonkian
- Geographic distribution: North America
- Ethnicity: Algonquian peoples
- Linguistic classification: Algic: Algonquian
- Proto-language: Proto-Algonquian
- Subdivisions: Arapahoan; Blackfoot; Cheyenne; Cree–Innu–Naskapi; Eastern Algonquian; Menominee; Meskwaki-Sauk-Kickapoo; Miami–Illinois; Ojibwe–Potawatomi; Shawnee
- Writing system: Latin alphabet, Canadian Aboriginal syllabics

Language codes
- ISO 639-2 / 5: alg
- Glottolog: algo1256 Algonquian-Blackfoot algo1257
- Pre-contact distribution of Algonquian languages

The Algonquian languages (/æl.ˈɡɒŋ.k(w)i.ən/ al-GONG-k(w)ee-ən; also Algonkian) are a branch of the Algic language family. The name of the Algonquian language family is distinguished from the orthographically similar Algonquin dialect of the Indigenous Ojibwe language (Chippewa), which is a member of the Algonquian language family. The term Algonquin has been suggested to derive from the Wolastoqey word elakómkwik (pronounced [ɛlæˈɡomoɡwik]), meaning "they are our relatives/allies".

Speakers of Algonquian languages stretch from the east coast of North America to the Rocky Mountains. The proto-language from which all of the languages of the family descend, Proto-Algonquian, was spoken around 2,500 to 3,000 years ago. There is no scholarly consensus about where this language was spoken.

== Family division ==
This subfamily of around 30 languages is divided into three groups according to geography: Plains, Central, and Eastern Algonquian. Of the three, only Eastern Algonquian constitutes a true genetic subgroup.

The languages are listed following the classifications of Goddard (1996) and Mithun (1999). Extinct languages are marked with †, and endangered languages are noted as such. For dialects and subdialects, consult the separate main articles for each of the three divisions.

- Algonquian
  - Plains
    - 1. Blackfoot
    - Arapahoan (including Besawunena †)
      - 2. Arapaho proper
      - 3. † Gros Ventre
      - 4. † Nawathinehena
    - 5. Cheyenne
  - Central
    - 6. Cree–Innu–Naskapi
    - 7. Menominee (severely endangered)
    - Ojibwe–Potawatomi
      - 8. Ojibwe
      - 9. Potawatomi (nearly extinct)
      - 10. Sauk–Fox–Kickapoo (severely endangered)
      - 11. Shawnee (severely endangered)
      - 12. † Miami–Illinois–Peoria
  - Eastern
    - 13. Miꞌkmaq
    - 14. Maliseet-Passamaquoddy
    - Abenaki
      - 15. Western Abenaki (nearly extinct)
      - 16. † Eastern Abenaki
    - 17. (†) Massachusett
    - 18. † Narragansett
    - 19. † Mohegan–Pequot
    - 20. † Quiripi-Naugatuck-Unquachog
    - Delawaran
      - 21. † Mohican
      - Lenape
        - 22. Munsee (nearly extinct)
        - 23. † Unami
    - 24. † Nanticoke
    - 25. † Piscataway (uncertain)
    - 26. † Carolina Algonquian
    - 27. † Powhatan
    - 28. † Etchemin (uncertain – See Eastern Algonquian languages)
    - 29. † Loup (probably about 5 different languages, uncertain)

=== Subgroups ===
Eastern Algonquian is a true genetic subgrouping. The Plains Algonquian and the Central Algonquian groups are not genetic groupings but rather areal groupings. Although these areal groups often do share linguistic features, these commonalities are usually attributed to language contact. Paul Proulx has argued that this traditional view is incorrect, and that Central Algonquian (in which he includes the Plains Algonquian languages) is a genetic subgroup, with Eastern Algonquian consisting of several different subgroups. However, this classification scheme has failed to gain acceptance from other specialists in the Algonquian languages.

Instead, the commonly accepted subgrouping scheme is that proposed by Ives Goddard (1994). The essence of this proposal is that Proto-Algonquian originated with people to the west who then moved east, although Goddard did not attempt to identify a specific western urheimat for Proto-Algonquian in his 1994 paper. By this scenario, Blackfoot was the first language to branch off, which coincides well with its being the most divergent language of Algonquian. In west-to-east order, the subsequent branchings were:

- Arapaho-Gros Ventre, Cree-Montagnais, Menominee, and Cheyenne;
- Then the core Great Lakes languages: (Ojibwe–Potawatomi, Shawnee, Sauk–Fox–Kickapoo, and Miami–Illinois); and
- Finally, Proto-Eastern Algonquian.

This historical reconstruction accords best with the observed levels of divergence within the family, whereby the most divergent languages are found furthest west (since they constitute the earliest branches during eastern migration), and the shallowest subgroupings are found furthest to the east (Eastern Algonquian, and arguably Core Central). This general west-to-east order is compatible with the proposal from J.P. Denny (1991) that Proto-Algonquian people may have moved east from the Plateau region of Idaho and Oregon or the Rocky Mountain-Great Plains boundary of Montana, dropping off subgroups as people migrated. Goddard also points out that there is clear evidence for pre-historical contact between Eastern Algonquian and Cree-Montagnais, as well as between Cheyenne and Arapaho–Gros Ventre. There has long been especially extensive back-and-forth influence between Cree and Ojibwe.

It has been suggested that the "Eastern Great Lakes" languages – what Goddard has called "Core Central", e.g., Ojibwe–Potawatomi, Shawnee, Sauk–Fox–Kickapoo, and Miami-Illinois (but not Cree–Montagnais or Menominee) – may also constitute their own genetic grouping within Algonquian. They share certain intriguing lexical and phonological innovations. However, this theory has not yet been fully fleshed out and is still considered conjectural.

Algonquian is sometimes said to have included the extinct Beothuk language of Newfoundland, whose speakers were both in geographic proximity to Algonquian speakers and who share DNA in common with the Algonquian-speaking Miꞌkmaq. However, linguistic evidence is scarce and poorly recorded, and it is unlikely that reliable evidence of a connection can be found.

== Grammatical features ==
The Algonquian language family is known for its complex polysynthetic morphology and sophisticated verb system. Statements that take many words to say in English can be expressed with a single word: for example, in Menominee, paehtāwāēwesew ("He is heard by higher powers" (paeht, "hear;" āwāē, "spirit;" -wese, passivizer; w, third-person subject)); or in Plains Cree, kāstāhikoyahk ("it frightens us"). These languages have been extensively studied by Leonard Bloomfield, Ives Goddard, and others.

Algonquian nouns have an animate/inanimate contrast: some nouns are classed as animate, while all other nouns are inanimate. There is ongoing debate over whether there is a semantic significance to the categorization of nouns as animate or inanimate, with scholars arguing for it as either a clearly semantic issue, or a purely syntactic issue, along with a variety of arguments in between. More structurally inclined linguistic scholars have argued that since there is no consistent semantic system for determining the animacy of a noun, that it must be a purely linguistic characterization. Anthropological linguists have conversely argued the strong connection between animacy and items viewed as having spiritual importance.

Another important distinction involves the contrast between nouns marked as proximate and those marked as obviative. Proximate nouns are those deemed most central or important to the discourse, while obviative nouns are those less important to the discourse.

There are personal pronouns which distinguish three persons, two numbers (singular and plural), inclusive and exclusive first person plural, and proximate and obviative third persons. Verbs are divided into four classes: transitive verbs with an animate object (abbreviated "TA"), transitive verbs with an inanimate object ("TI"), intransitive verbs with an animate subject ("AI"), and intransitive verbs with an inanimate subject ("II").

A very notable feature of the Algonquian languages is their direct–inverse (also known as hierarchical) morphosyntactic alignment, distinguishing between an unmarked voice where the subject outranks the object in a person hierarchy and a marked voice where the opposite relation obtains.

== Vocabulary ==
=== Loan words ===
Because Algonquian languages were some of the first with which Europeans came into contact in North America, the language family has given many words to English. Many eastern and midwestern U.S. states have names of Algonquian origin (Massachusetts, Connecticut, Illinois, Michigan, Wisconsin, etc.), as do many cities: Milwaukee, Chicago, et al. Ottawa, the capital of Canada, is named after the Algonquian nation, the Odawa people.

For a more detailed treatment of geographical names in three Algonquian languages, see the external link to the book by Trumbull.

== See also ==
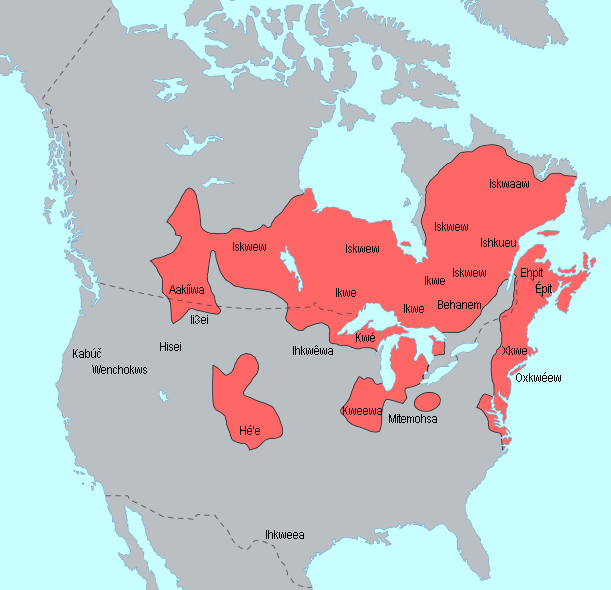
The word 'woman' in the different Algonquian languages

- Algic languages (from Proto-Algic)
- Algonquian Bible
- Algonquian peoples
- Algonquin language – a similarly named language which is a member of the Algonquian language family
- Central Algonquian languages
- Eastern Algonquian languages
- Plains Algonquian languages
- Indigenous languages of the Americas
- Leonard Bloomfield
- Ives Goddard
- H.C. Wolfart
- List of Algonquian personal names

== Bibliography ==
- "Algonquian". Dictionary.com.
- Bloomfield, Leonard (1946). "Algonquian". Linguistic Structures of Native America. Viking Fund Publications in Anthropology. Vol. 6. New York.
- Bright, William (2004). Native American Place Names of the United States. Norman: University of Oklahoma Press.
- Campbell, Lyle (1997). American Indian languages: The historical linguistics of Native America. New York: Oxford University Press. ISBN 0-19-509427-1.
- Denny, J. Peter (1991). "The Algonquian Migration from Plateau to Midwest: Linguistics and Archaeology". In Cowan, William (ed.). Papers of the 22nd Algonquian Conference. 22nd Algonquian Conference. Ottawa: Carleton University. pp. 103–24.
- Goddard, Ives (1978). "Central Algonquian Languages". In Trigger, Bruce G. (ed.). Northeast. Handbook of North American Indians, ed. William C. Sturtevant. Vol. 15. Washington, DC: Smithsonian Institution. pp. 583–87. ISBN 978-0-16-004575-2.
- Goddard, Ives (1979). "Comparative Algonquian". In Campbell, Lyle; Mithun, Marianne (eds.). The Languages of Native North America: Historical and Comparative Assessment. Austin: University of Texas Press. pp. 70–132.
- Goddard, Ives (1994). "The West-to-East Cline in Algonquian Dialectology". In Cowan, William (ed.). Papers of the 25th Algonquian Conference. 25th Algonquian Conference. Ottawa: Carleton University. pp. 187–211.
- Goddard, Ives (1996). "Introduction". In Goddard, Ives (ed.). Languages. Handbook of North American Indians, edited by William C. Sturtevant. Vol. 17. Washington, DC: Smithsonian Institution. ISBN 978-0-87474197-1.
- Kuch, Melanie (2007). "A preliminary analysis of the DNA and diet of the extinct Beothuk: A systematic approach to ancient human DNA" (PDF). American Journal of Physical Anthropology. 132 (4): 594–604. doi:10.1002/ajpa.20536. PMID 17205549. Archived from the original (PDF) on 2011-07-25.
- Mithun, Marianne (1999). The languages of Native North America. Cambridge University Press. ISBN 0-521-23228-7.
- Moondancer; Woman, Strong (2007). A Cultural History of the Native Peoples of Southern New England: Voices from Past and Present. Boulder, Colorado: Bauu Press. ISBN 978-0-9721349-3-4.
- O'Brien, Frank Waabu (2010). Understanding Indian Place Names in Southern New England. Colorado: Bauu Press. ISBN 978-0-9820467-6-0.
- Pentland, David H. (2006). "Algonquian and Ritwan Languages". In Brown, Keith (ed.). Encyclopedia of Languages and Linguistics (2nd ed.). Elsevier. pp. 161–6.
- Proulx, Paul (2003). "The Evidence on Algonquian Genetic Grouping: A Matter of Relative Chronology". Anthropological Linguistics. 45: 201–25.
