= Plains Algonquian languages =

Language subgroup

Plains Algonquian
- Plains Algonkian
- (areal)
- Geographic distribution: Great Plains of the northern United States and southern Canada
- Linguistic classification: Algic: Algonquian; Plains Algonquian
- Subdivisions: Nitsitapi; Cheyenne; Arapahoan group

Language codes
- Glottolog: None chey1247 (Cheyenne) siks1238 (Siksika) arap1273 (Arapahoic)

The Plains Algonquian languages are commonly grouped together as a subgroup of the larger Algonquian family, itself a member of the Algic family. Though the grouping is often encountered in the literature, it is an areal grouping rather than a genetic one. In other words, the languages are grouped together because they were spoken near one another, not because they are more closely related to one another than to any other Algonquian language. Most studies indicate that within the Algonquian family, only Eastern Algonquian constitutes a separate genetic subgroup.

== Family ==
The Plains Algonquian languages are well known for having diverged significantly from Proto-Algonquian (the parent of all Algonquian languages), both phonologically and lexically. For example, Proto-Algonquian *keriwa, "eagle", becomes Cheyenne netse; Proto-Algonquian *weθali, "her husband", becomes Arapaho ííx, *nepyi, "water" becomes Gros Ventre níc, *wa·poswa, "hare" becomes Arapaho nóóku, *maθkwa, "bear" becomes Arapaho wox, and *sakime·wa, "fly" becomes Arapaho noubee. Proto-Algonquian *eθkwe·wa 'woman' becomes Arapaho hisei, Cheyenne hé’e, Gros Ventre iiθe, and Nitsitapi skiima "female animal" and -ohkiimi- "have a wife".

=== Family division ===
Pre-contact distribution of Algonquian languages

The languages are listed below along with dialects and subdialects. This classification follows Goddard (1996, 2001) and Mithun (1999).

- Plains Algonquian
  - Blackfoot (also known as Blackfeet or Siksiká)
  - Arapahoan
    - Arapaho–Atsina
      - Arapaho (also known as Arapahoe or Arapafoe)
      - Gros Ventre (also known as Atsina, Aáni, Ahahnelin, Ahe, A'aninin, A'ane, or A'ananin) †
      - Besawunena †
    - Nawathinehena †
    - Ha’anahawunena †
  - Cheyenne
    - Cheyenne
    - Sutaio (also known as Soʼtaaʼe) †

== See also ==
- Algonquian peoples

== Bibliography ==
- Berman, Howard (2006). "Studies in Blackfoot prehistory". International Journal of American Linguistics, vol. 72, no. 2, 264–284.
- Campbell, Lyle (1997). American Indian languages: The historical linguistics of Native America. New York: Oxford University Press. ISBN 0-19-509427-1.
- Goddard, Ives (1994). "The West-to-East Cline in Algonquian Dialectology." In William Cowan, ed., Papers of the 25th Algonquian Conference 187-211. Ottawa: Carleton University.
- ———— (1996). "Introduction". In Ives Goddard, ed., "Languages". Vol. 17 of William Sturtevant, ed., The Handbook of North American Indians. Washington, D.C.: Smithsonian Institution.
- ———— (2001). "The Algonquian Languages of the Plains". In Raymond J. DeMaille, ed., "Plains". Vol. 13 of William Sturtevant, ed., The Handbook of North American Indians. Washington, D.C.: Smithsonian Institution.
- Mithun, Marianne (1999). The languages of Native North America. Cambridge: Cambridge University Press. ISBN 0-521-23228-7 (hbk); ISBN 0-521-29875-X.
