= Ives Goddard =

American linguist (1941–2025)

- Born: Robert Hale Ives Goddard III; June 12, 1941
- Died: August 6, 2025 (aged 84)
- Known for: Work with Algonquian and Algic languages

Academic background
- Education: Harvard College (A.B.); Harvard University (Ph.D.)
- Doctoral advisor: Karl V. Teeter

Academic work
- Discipline: Linguistics
- Institutions: Smithsonian Institution, Harvard University

Robert Hale Ives Goddard III (June 12, 1941 – August 6, 2025) was an American linguist and curator in the Department of Anthropology of the National Museum of Natural History at the Smithsonian Institution. He is widely considered to have been the leading expert of his time on the Algonquian languages and the larger Algic language family.

== Early life and education ==
Goddard received his A.B. from Harvard College in 1963 and his Ph.D. from Harvard University in 1969. From 1966 to 1969 he was a junior fellow of the Harvard Society of Fellows.

== Career ==
After earning his doctorate, Goddard taught for several years at Harvard as a junior professor.

In 1975, he moved to the Smithsonian Institution. His own field research in linguistics concentrated on the Delaware languages and Meskwaki (Fox). He is also known for work on the Algonquian Massachusett language, and the history of the Cheyenne language. He also published on the history of the Arapahoan branch of Algonquian: its two current lines that are extant are Arapaho and Gros Ventre, spoken by tribal members in the West.

Goddard is a prominent figure in the study of the methodology of historical linguistics. He played a significant role in critiquing crank historical linguistic work.

He was the linguistic and technical editor of the Handbook of North American Indians.

== Death ==
Goddard died from pancreatic cancer on August 6, 2025, in Washington, DC.

== Awards ==
- He received the Kenneth L. Hale Award from the LSA in 2002.
- Goddard and Thomas Love received the Joel Palmer Award in 2005 for their article "Oregon the Beautiful".

== Publications ==
- Kiyana, Alfred. (2022) Masahkamikohkwêwa (Grandmother Earth), Thomason, Lucy G. and Goddard, Ives, editors. Petoskey, Michigan: Mundart Press. ISBN 9798986545004
- Goddard, Ives (2021). A Grammar of Southern Unami Delaware (Lenape). Mundart Press. ISBN 978-0990334439.
- Goddard, Ives; Bragdon, Kathleen Joan (1988). Native Writings in Massachusett. American Philosophical Society. ISBN 087169185X.
- Goddard, I. (1999). Native Languages and Language Families of North America (Rev. and enlarged ed., with additions and corrections, 1999) [Map]. University of Nebraska Press. Then by the Smithsonian Institution.
