= Cheyenne language =

Algonquian language spoken in the United States

Cheyenne
- Tsėhesenėstsestȯtse
- Pronunciation: [tse̥hésene̥stsesto̥tse]
- Native to: United States
- Region: Montana and Oklahoma
- Ethnicity: Cheyenne
- Native speakers: 789 (2021)
- Language family: Algic: Algonquian; Cheyenne
- Dialects: Cheyenne; Sutaio †
- Signed forms: Hand Talk

Language codes
- ISO 639-2: chy
- ISO 639-3: chy
- Glottolog: chey1247
- ELP: Cheyenne

- Cheyenne is classified as Definitely Endangered by the UNESCO Atlas of the World's Languages in Danger.

Cheyenne (Tsėhésenėstsestȯtse, pronounced [tse̥hésene̥stsesto̥tse], informal spelling Tsisinstsistots) is an indigenous language of North America, spoken mainly in present-day Montana and Oklahoma, in the United States. It is a member of the Algonquian language family, and named for the Cheyenne peoples, who are native to the Great Plains of the United States.

Cheyenne is an endangered language. The endangerment is primarily a result of the English being the most spoken language in the world, due to the global influences of the post-British Empire Anglophilic world and the United States.

Like all other Algonquian languages, it has a complex agglutination and polysynthetic morphology. Cheyenne is either the first language, or the second language, for approximately 789 individuals in the United States.

== Classification ==
Cheyenne is one of the Algonquian languages, which is a subcategory of the Algic languages. Specifically, it is a Plains Algonquian language. Although, Plains Algonquian, which also includes Arapaho and Blackfoot, is an areal rather than genetic subgrouping.

== Name ==
Tsétsėhéstȧhese (more commonly as the Tsitsistas; singular: Tsétsėhéstaestse) is the word the Cheyenne called themselves, which translates to "those who are like this". The Suhtai, also called the Só'taeo'o, Só'taétaneo'o, Sutaio (singular: Só'taétane) traveled with the Tsétsêhéstâhese and merged with them after 1832. The Suhtai had slightly different speech and customs from the Tsétsėhéstȧhese.

== Geographic distribution ==
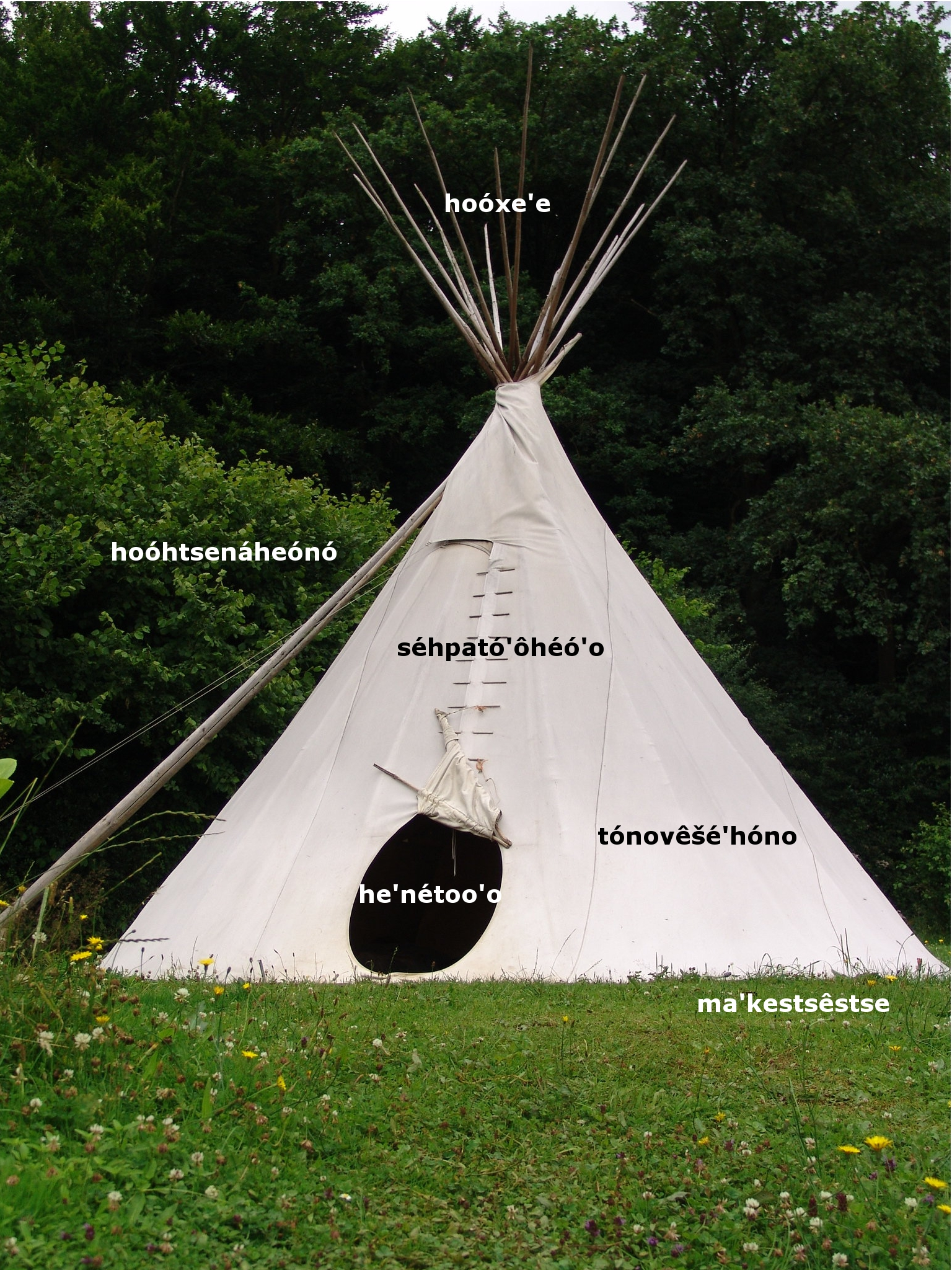
Tipi parts in Cheyenne

Cheyenne is spoken on the Northern Cheyenne Indian Reservation in Montana and in Oklahoma. On the Northern Cheyenne Indian Reservation in March 2013 there were approximately 10,050 enrolled tribal members, of which about 4,939 resided on the reservation; slightly more than a quarter of the population five years or older spoke a language other than English.

=== Current status ===
The Cheyenne language is considered "definitely endangered" in Montana and "critically endangered" in Oklahoma by the UNESCO. In Montana the number of speakers were about 1700 in 2012 according to the UNESCO. In 2021 there were approximately 300 elderly speakers. In 2021 in Oklahoma there were fewer than 20 elderly speakers. There is no current information on any other state in the United States regarding the Cheyenne language.

The 2017 film Hostiles features extensive dialogue in Cheyenne. The film's producers hired experts in the language and culture to ensure authenticity.

== Revitalization efforts and education ==
In 1997, the Cultural Affairs Department of Chief Dull Knife College applied to the Administration for Native Americans for an approximately $50,000 language preservation planning grant. The department wanted to use this money to assess the degree to which Cheyenne was being spoken on the Northern Cheyenne Reservation. Following this, the department wanted to use the compiled data to establish long-term community language goals, and to prepare Chief Dull Knife College to implement a Cheyenne Language Center and curriculum guide. In 2015, the Chief Dull Knife College sponsored the 18th Annual Language Immersion Camp. This event was organized into two weeklong sessions, and its aim was to educate the younger generation on their ancestral language. The first session focused on educating 5–10-year-olds, while the second session focused on 11- to 18-year-olds. Certified Cheyenne language instructors taught daily classes. Ultimately, the camp provided approximately ten temporary jobs for fluent speakers on the impoverished reservation. The state of Montana has passed a law that guarantees support for tribal language preservation for Montana tribes. Classes in the Cheyenne language are available at Chief Dull Knife College in Lame Deer, Montana, at Southwestern Oklahoma State University, and at Watonga High School in Watonga, Oklahoma. There are also holistic approaches to language revitalization taken upon by the Cheyenne people to try and keep their language vital. This is done by recognizing the integrated nature of the Cheyenne language with games, crafts, and ceremony which are integrated in youth and community programs. The language is very often not being taught in the home so instead of just teaching grammar as a revitalization effort, holistic approaches attract more attention from new speakers and educate the new generation and counter language and culture loss.

== Phonology ==
=== Vowels ===
	Front	Central	Back
Mid	e		o
Open		a	

- /e/ is usually realized as [ɪ], but is sometimes lowered to [ɛ].
- Vowels are allophonically devoiced in certain environments; see #Voicing

=== Consonants ===
	Labial	Dental	Post- alveolar	Velar	Glottal
Nasal	m	n			
Plosive	p	t ~ ts		k	ʔ
Fricative	v ~ ʋ	s	ʃ	(x)	h

- /p t k/ are tenuis [p t k].
- /h/ is realized as [s] between /e/ and /t/ and as [ʃ] between /e/ and /k/, e.g.
  - nȧhtona /nahtóna/ 'my daughter'
  - nėstona /nehtóna/ 'your daughter'
  - heške /hehke/ 'his mother'
- /t/ is affricated [ts] before /e/.
- [x] is an allophone of:
  - /ʃ/ adjacent to /a/ or /o/
  - the past tense morpheme h preceding another morpheme which starts with /h/.

=== Orthography ===
The Cheyenne orthography of 14 letters is neither a pure phonemic system nor a phonetic transcription; it is, in the words of linguist Wayne Leman, a "pronunciation orthography". In other words, it is a practical spelling system designed to facilitate proper pronunciation; some allophonic variants, e.g. voiceless vowels, are represented.

IPA
a	e	h	k	ʔ	m	n	o	p	s	ʃ	t	v	x
Grapheme
a	e	h	k	'	m	n	o	p	s	š	t	v	x

- ⟨á, é, ó⟩ – high tone
- ⟨a, e, o⟩ – low tone
- ⟨ȧ, ė, ȯ⟩ – voiceless or whispered

=== Feature system for phonemes ===
The systematic phonemes of Cheyenne are distinguished by seven two-valued features. Scholar Donald G. Frantz defined these features as follows:

- Oral: primary articulation is oral (vs. at the glottis)
- Vocoid (voc): central resonant (oral) continuant
- Syllabic (syl): nuclear to syllable (vs. marginal)
- Closure (clos): stoppage of air flow at point of primary articulation ['non-continuant']
- Nasal (nas): velic is open
- Grave (grv): primary articulation at oral extremity (lips or velum) ['non-coronal' for consonants, 'back' for vowels]
- Diffuse (dif): primary articulation is relatively front ['anterior']

	ʔ	h	a	o	e	m	n	p	k	t	v	s	š	x
oral	−	(+)	(+)	(+)	(+)	(+)	(+)	+	+	+	(+)	(+)	(+)	(+)
voc	(−)	+	(+)	(+)	(+)	(−)	(−)	(−)	(−)	(−)	−	−	−	−
syl	(−)	−	+	+	+	(−)	(−)	(−)	(−)	(−)	(−)	(−)	(−)	(−)
clos	(+)	(−)	(−)	(−)	(−)	(+)	(+)	+	+	+	−	−	−	−
nas	0	(−)	(−)	(−)	(−)	+	+	−	(−)	−	(−)	(−)	(−)	(−)
grv	0		−	+	(−)	+	−	+	+	−	+	−	−	+
dif	0		−	−	+	+	(+)	+	−	(+)	+	+	−	−

0 indicates the value is indeterminable/irrelevant. A blank indicates the value is specifiable, but context is required (even though any value could be inserted because the post-cyclical rules would change the value to the correct one). Parentheses enclose values that are redundant according to the phonological rules; these values simply represent the results of these rules.

=== Voicing ===
Cheyenne has 14 orthographic letters representing 13 phonemes. [x] is written as ⟨x⟩ orthographically but is not a phoneme. This count excludes the results of allophonic devoicing, which are spelled with a dot over vowels. Devoicing naturally occurs in the last vowel of a word or phrase but can also occur in vowels at the penultimate and prepenultimate positions within a word. Non-high [a] and [o] is also usually devoiced preceding h followed by a stop. Phonemic /h/ is absorbed by a preceding voiceless vowel. Examples are given below.

==== Penultimate devoicing ====
- /hohkoʃ/ hohkȯxe 'ax';
- /tétahpetáht/ tsétȧhpétȧhtse 'the one who is big';
- /mótehk/ motšėške 'knife'

Devoicing occurs when certain vowels directly precede the consonants [t], [s], [ʃ], [k], or [x] followed by an [e]. The rule is linked to the rule of e-epenthesis, which states simply that [e] appears in the environment of a consonant and a word boundary.

==== Prepenultimate devoicing ====
- /tahpeno/ tȧhpeno 'flute';
- /kosáné/ kȯsâne 'sheep (pl.)';
- /mahnohtehtovot/ mȧhnȯhtsėstovȯtse 'if you ask him'

A vowel that does not have a high pitch is devoiced if it is followed by a voiceless fricative and not preceded by [h].

==== Special [a] and [o] devoicing ====
- /émóheeohtéo/ émôheeȯhtseo'o 'they are gathering';
- /náohkeho'sóe/ náȯhkėho'soo'e 'I regularly dance';
- /nápóahtenáhnó/ nápôȧhtsenáhno 'I punched him in the mouth'

Non-high [a] and [o] become at least partially devoiced when they are preceded by a voiced vowel and followed by an [h], a consonant, and two or more syllables.

==== Consonant devoicing ====
émane [ɪmaṅɪ] 'He is drinking.'

Before a voiceless segment, a consonant is devoiced.

==== h-absorption ====
- -pėhévoéstomo'he 'kind' + -htse 'imperative suffix' > -pėhévoéstomo'ėstse
- tsé- 'conjunct prefix' + -éna'he 'old' + -tse '3rd pers. suffix' > tsééna'ėstse 'the one who is old'
- né + 'you' + -one'xȧho'he 'burn' + tse 'suffix for some 'you-me' transitive animate forms' > néone'xȧho'ėstse ' you burn me'

The [h] is absorbed if it is preceded or followed by voiceless vowels.

=== Pitch and tone ===
There are several rules that govern pitch use in Cheyenne. Pitch can be ˊ = high, unmarked = low, ˉ = mid, and ˆ = raised high. According to linguist Wayne Leman, some research shows that Cheyenne may have a stress system independent from that of pitch. If this is the case, the stress system's role is very minor in Cheyenne prosody. It would have no grammatical or lexical function, unlike pitch.

==== High-raising ====
A high pitch becomes a raised high when it is not preceded by another high vowel and precedes an underlying word-final high.

- /ʃéʔʃé/ šê'še 'duck';
- /sémón/ sêmo 'boat'

==== Low-to-high raising ====
A low vowel is raised to the high position when it follows a high and is followed by a word final high.

- /méʃené/ méšéne 'ticks';
- /návóomó/ návóómo 'I see him';
- /póesón/ póéso 'cat'

==== Low-to-mid raising ====
A low vowel becomes a mid when it is followed by a word-final high but not directly preceded by a high vowel.

- /kosán/ kōsa 'sheep (sg.)';
- /heʔé/ hē'e 'woman';
- /éhomosé/ éhomōse 'he is cooking'

=== High pushover ===
A high vowel becomes low if it comes after a high and followed by a phonetic low.

- /néháóénáma/ néhâoenama 'we (incl) prayed';
- /néméhótóne/ némêhotone 'we (incl) love him';
- /náméhósanémé/ námêhosanême 'we (excl) love'

==== Word-medial high raising ====
According to Leman, "some verbal prefixes and preverbs go through the process of Word-Medial High-Raising. A high is raised if it follows a high (which is not a trigger for the High Push-Over rule) and precedes a phonetic low. One or more voiceless syllables may come between the two highs. (A devoiced vowel in this process must be underlyingly low, not an underlyingly high vowel which has been devoiced by the High-Pitch Devoicing rule.)"

- /émésehe/ émêsehe 'he is eating';
- /téhnémenétó/ tséhnêmenéto 'when I sang';
- /násáamétohénoto/ násâamétȯhênoto 'I didn't give him to him'

=== Tone ===
Syllables with high pitch (tone) are relatively high pitched and are marked by an acute accent: ⟨á, é, ó⟩. The following pairs of phrases demonstrate pitch contrasts in the Cheyenne language:

- maxháeanáto 'if I am hungry'
- maxháeanato 'if you are hungry'
- hótame 'dog'
- hotāme 'dogs'

As noted by Donald G. Frantz, phonological rules dictate some pitch patterns, as indicated by the frequent shift of accent when suffixes are added (e.g. compare matšėškōme 'raccoon' and mátšėškomeo'o 'raccoons'). In order for the rules to work, certain vowels are assigned inherent accent. For example, the word for 'badger' has a permanent accent position: ma'háhko'e (sg.), ma'háhko'eo'o (pl.)

=== Nonnasal reflexes of Proto-Algonquian *k ===
The research of linguist Paul Proulx provides an explanation for how these reflexes develop in Cheyenne: "First, *n and *h drop and all other consonants give glottal catch before *k. *k then drops except in element-final position. Next, there is an increment before any remaining *k not preceded by a glottal catch: a secondary h (replaced by š after e) ) in words originating in the Cheyenne Proper dialect, and a vowel in those originating in the Sutaio (So'taa'e) dialect. In the latter dialect the *k gives glottal catch in a word-final syllable (after the loss of some final syllables) and drops elsewhere, leaving the vowel increment. Sutaio k clusters are all reduced to glottal catch."

== Grammar ==
Cheyenne is a morphologically polysynthetic language with a sophisticated, agglutinating verb system contrasting a relatively simple noun structure. Many Cheyenne verbs can stand alone in sentences, and can be translated by complete English sentences. Aside from its verb structure, Cheyenne has several grammatical features that are typical of Algonquian languages, including an animate/inanimate noun classification paradigm, an obviative third person and distinction of clusivity in the first person plural pronoun.

=== Order and mode ===
Like all Algonquian languages, Cheyenne shows a highly developed modal paradigm. Algonquianists traditionally describe the inflections of verbs in these languages as being divided into three "orders", with each order further subdivided into a series of "modes", each of which communicates some aspect of modality. The charts below provide examples of verb forms of every order in each mode, after Leman (2011) and Mithun (1999).

==== Independent order ====
This order governs both declarative and interrogative statements. The modes of this order are generally subdivided along lines of evidentiality.

Mode	Example	Translation
Indicative	épėhêvahe	'he is good'
Interrogative	épėhêvȧhehe	'is he good?'
Inferential	mópėhêvȧhehêhe	'he must be good'
Attributive	épėhêvahesėstse	'he is said to be good'
Mediate	éhpehêvahêhoo'o	'long ago he was good'

==== Conjunct order ====
This order governs a variety of dependent clause types. Leman (2011) characterizes this order of verbs as requiring other verbal elements in order to establish complete meaning. Verbs in the conjunct order are marked with a mode-specific prefix and a suffix marking person, number and animacy.

Mode	Example	Translation
Indicative	tséhpėhêvaese	'when he was good'
Subjunctive	mȧhpėhévaestse	'when he is good' (unrealized)
Iterative	ho'pėhévȧhesėstse	'whenever he is good'
Subjunctive Iterative	ohpėhévȧhesėstse	'when he is generally good'
Participle	tséhpėhêvaestse	'the one who is good'
Interrogative	éópėhêvaestse	'whether he is good'
Obligative	ahpėhêvȧhesėstse	'he ought to be good'
Optative	momóxepėhévaestse	'I wish he would be good'
Negative inferential	móho'nópėhévaestse	'he must not be good'

==== Imperative order ====
The third order governs commands. Cheyenne, in common with several other North American languages, distinguishes two types of imperative mood, one indicating immediate action, and the other indicating delayed action.

Mode	Example	Translation
Immediate	méseestse	'eat!'
Delayed	méseheo'o	'eat later!'
Hortative	mésėheha	'let him eat!'

=== Verb morphology ===
The Cheyenne verb system is very complex and verb constructions are central to the morphosyntax of the language, to the point that even adjectives and even some nouns are largely substantive in nature. Verbs change according to a number of factors, such as modality, person and transitivity, as well as the animacy of the referent, each of these categories being indicated by the addition of an affix to the basic verb stem. There are also several instrumental, locative and adverbial affixes that add further information to the larger verb construction. This can result in very long, complex verbs that are able to stand alone as entire sentences in their own right. All Cheyenne verbs have a rigid templatic structure. The affixes are placed according to the following paradigm:

person – (tense) – (directional) – (preverb) – ROOT – (medial) – final

==== Pronominal affixes ====
Cheyenne represents the participants of an expression not as separate pronoun words but as affixes on the verb. There are three basic pronominal prefixes in Cheyenne:

- ná- first person
- né- second person
- é- third person

These three basic prefixes can be combined with various suffixes to express all of Cheyenne's pronominal distinctions. For example, the prefix ná- can be combined on a verb with the suffix -me to express the first person plural exclusive.

==== Tense ====
Tense in Cheyenne is expressed by the addition of a specific tense morpheme between the pronominal prefix and the verb stem. Verbs do not always contain tense information, and an unmarked present tense verb can be used to express both present and "recent" past tense in conversation. Thus, návóómo could mean either 'I see him' or 'I saw him (recently)' depending on the context.

Far past tense is expressed by the morpheme /-h-/, which changes to /-x-/, /-s-/, /-š-/ or /-'-/ before the -h, -t, -k and a vowel, respectively. Thus:

- návóómo 'I see him'
- náhvóómo 'I saw him'

Similarly, the future tense is expressed by the morpheme /-hte/, which changes to -htse after the ná- pronominal, -stse after ne- and -tse in the third-person, with the third-person prefix dropped altogether.

==== Directional affixes ====
These prefixes address whether the action of the verb is moving "toward" or "away from" some entity, usually the speaker.

- -nėh- toward
- -nex- toward (before -h)
- -ne'- toward (before a vowel)
- -nes- toward (before -t)
- -ta- away from

==== Preverbs ====
Following Algonquianist terminology, Leman (2011) describes "preverbs", morphemes which add adjectival or adverbial information to the verb stem. Multiple preverbs can be combined within one verb complex. The following list represents only a small sample.

- -emóose- secretly
- -nésta- previously
- -sé'hove- suddenly
- -áhane- extremely
- -táve- slightly
- -ohke- regularly
- -pȧháve- good, well
- -ma'xe- much, a lot
- -hé- for the purpose of
- -ha'ke- slowly, softly
- -hoove- mistakenly

==== Medial affixes ====
This large group of suffixes provide information about something associated with the root, usually communicating that the action is done with or to a body part. Thus: énėše'xahtse ('he-wash-mouth') = 'he gargled'. Following is a sample of medial suffixes:

- -ahtse mouth
- -éné face
- -na'evá arm
- -vétová body
- -he'oná hand
- -hahtá foot

Medial suffixes can also be used with nouns to create compound words or to coin entirely new words from existing morphemes, as in:

ka'énė-hôtame [short-face-dog] = 'bulldog'

==== Final affixes ====
Cheyenne verbs take different object agreement endings depending upon the animacy of the subject and the transitivity of the verb itself. Intransitive verbs take endings depending upon the animacy of their subject, whereas transitive verbs take endings that depend upon the animacy of their object. All verbs can therefore be broadly categorized into one of four classes: Animate Intransitive (AI), Inanimate Instransitive (II), Transitive Animate (TA) and Transitive Inanimate (TI). Following are the most common object agreement markers for each verb class.

- -e Animate Intransitive (AI)
- -ó Inanimate Intransitive (II)
- -o Transitive Animate (TA)
- -á/-é Transitive Inanimate (TI)

==== Negation ====
Verbs are negated by the addition of the infix -sâa- immediately after the pronominal affix. This morpheme changes to sáa- in the absence of a pronominal affix, as occurs in the imperative and in some future tense constructions.

=== Nouns ===
Nouns are classified according to animacy. They change according to grammatical number (singular and plural) but are not distinguished according to gender or definiteness.

==== Obviation ====
When two third persons are referred to by the same verb, the object of the sentence becomes obviated, what Algonquianists refer to as a "fourth person". It is essentially an "out of focus" third person. As with possessive obviation above, the presence of a fourth person triggers morphological changes in both the verb and noun. If the obviated entity is an animate noun, it will be marked with an obviative suffix, typically -o or -óho. For example:

- návóómo hetane 'I saw a man'
- he'e évôomóho hetanóho 'The woman saw a man'

Verbs register the presence of obviated participants whether or not they are present as nouns. These forms could be likened to a kind of passive voice, although Esteban (2012) argues that since Cheyenne is a "reference-dominated language where case marking and word order are governed by the necessity to code pragmatic roles", a passive-like construction is assumed. This phenomenon is an example of typical Algonquian "person hierarchy", in which animacy and first personhood take precedence over other forms.

==== Number ====
Both animate and inanimate nouns are pluralized by the addition of suffixes. These suffixes are irregular and can change slightly according to a complex system of phonological rules.

- -(h)o, -(n)é Inanimate plural
- -(n)ȯtse Animate plural

==== Possession ====
Possession is denoted by a special set of pronominal suffixes. Following is a list of the most common possession prefixes, although rarely some words take different prefixes.

- na- first person
- ne- second person
- he- third person

Generally, possessive prefixes take a low pitch on the following vowel.

When a third person animate noun is possessed by another third person, the noun becomes obviated and takes a different form. Much of the time, this obviated form is identical to the noun's regular plural form, with only a few exceptions. This introduces ambiguity in that it is not always possible to tell whether an obviated noun is singular or plural.

== Historical development ==
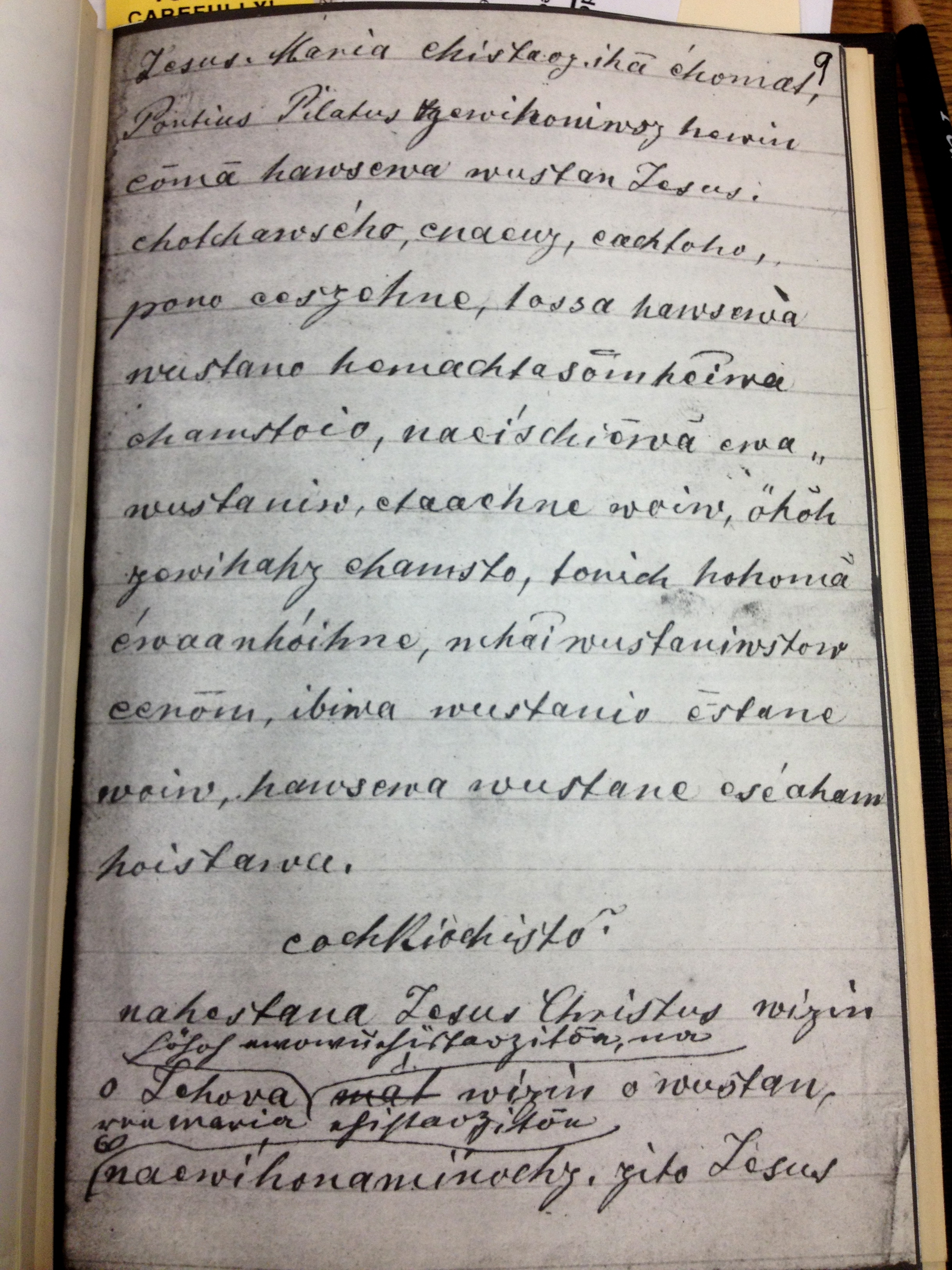
Cheyenne catechism page 9

Like all the Algonquian languages, Cheyenne developed from a reconstructed ancestor referred to as Proto-Algonquian (often abbreviated "PA"). The sound changes on the road from PA to modern Cheyenne are complex, as exhibited by the development of the PA word *erenyiwa 'man' into Cheyenne hetane:

- First, the PA suffix *-wa drops (*erenyi)
- The geminate vowel sequence *-yi- simplifies to /i/ (semivowels were phonemically vowels in PA; when PA */i/ or */o/ appeared before another vowel, it became non-syllabic) (*ereni)
- PA */r/ changes to /t/ (*eteni)
- /h/ is added before word-initial vowels (*heteni)
- Due to a vowel chain-shift, the vowels in the word wind up as /e/, /a/ and /e/ (PA */e/ sometimes corresponds to Cheyenne /e/ and sometimes to Cheyenne /a/; PA */i/ almost always corresponds to Cheyenne /e/, however) (hetane).

PA *θk has the Sutaio reflex ' in e-nete'e 'she tells lies', but the Cheyenne-Proper reflex 'k in hetone'ke 'tree-bark'. According to linguist Paul Proulx, this gave off the appearance that "speakers of both Cheyenne dialects—perhaps mixed bands—were involved in the Arapaho contact that led to this unusual reflex of PA *k.".

== Lexicon ==
Some Cheyenne words (with the Proto-Algonquian reconstructions where known):

- ame 'grease' (from PA *pemyi)
- he'e 'his liver' (from PA *weθkweni)
- hē'e 'woman' (from PA *eθkwe·wa)
- hetane 'man' (from PA *erenyiwa)
- matana 'milk' (from PA *meθenyi)

== Translation history ==
Early work was done on the Cheyenne language by Rodolphe Charles Petter, a Mennonite missionary based in Lame Deer, Montana, from 1916. Petter published a mammoth dictionary of Cheyenne in 1915.

=== Current translations ===
Currently there are many online resources that allow for the instant translation from any language to the Cheyenne language. There are online vocabulary lists, pronunciation guides, dictionaries, etc. Along with these resources, there are numbers of published books regarding the history of the language that also explain its grammar. These resources can be found online or in libraries that carry these published books.

The latest edition of an online Cheyenne dictionary is accessible from cheyennelanguage.org.

== Bibliography ==
- Corral Esteban, Avelino (2012). "Does There Exist Passive Voice in Lakhota and Cheyenne?". Revista de Lingüística y Lenguas Aplicadas. 7: 77–96. doi:10.4995/rlyla.2012.1126. hdl:10251/16758.
- Fisher, Louise; Pine, Leroy Sr.; Sanchez, Marie; Leman, Wayne (2004). Cheyenne Dictionary. Lame Deer, MT: Chief Dull Knife College.
- Frantz, Donald G. (1972a). "Cheyenne Distinctive Features and Phonological Rules". International Journal of American Linguistics. 38 (1): 6–13. doi:10.1086/465178. JSTOR 1264497. S2CID 144308038.
- Frantz, Donald G. (1972b). "The Origin of Cheyenne Pitch Accent". International Journal of American Linguistics. 38 (4): 223–225. doi:10.1086/465218. JSTOR 1264297. S2CID 143834373.
- Goddard, Ives (2000). Nichols, John D. (ed.). "The historical origins of Cheyenne inflections" (PDF). Papers of the Algonquian Conference. 31. Winnnipeg: University of Manitoba: 78–129. hdl:10088/31967.
- Leman, Wayne (1979). Cheyenne Grammar Notes. Lame Deer, MT: Northern Cheyenne Bilingual Education Program. OCLC 5355398.
- Leman, Wayne (October 1981). "Cheyenne Pitch Rules". International Journal of American Linguistics. 47 (4): 283–309. doi:10.1086/465700. JSTOR 1265058. S2CID 145668413.
- Leman, Wayne (2011). A Reference Grammar of the Cheyenne Language (4th ed.). Lulu Press. ISBN 978-1-304-42524-9.
- Mithun, Marianne (1999). The Languages of Native North America. Cambridge University Press.
- Murray, Sarah E. (2012). "Two Imperatives in Cheyenne: Some Preliminary Distinctions". Papers of the Algonquian Conference. 44. State University of New York Press: 242–256.
- Petter, Rodolphe (1905). Sketch of the Cheyenne Grammar. Lancaster, PA: American Anthropological Association.
- Petter, Rodolphe (1915). English-Cheyenne Dictionary. Kettle Falls, WA: Rodolphe Petter.
- Proulx, Paul (1982-01-01). "Proto-Algonquian *k in Cheyenne". International Journal of American Linguistics. 48 (4): 467–471. doi:10.1086/465756. JSTOR 1264849. S2CID 143457331.

Indigenous languages of the Americas with Wikipedia
Item	Label/en	native label	Code	distribution map	number of speakers, writers, or signers	UNESCO language status	Ethnologue language status	?itemwiki
Q36806	Southern Quechua	qu:Urin Qichwa qu:Qhichwa qu:Qichwa	qu		6000000	2 vulnerable		Quechua Wikipedia
Q35876	Guarani	gn:Avañe'ẽ	gn		4850000	1 safe	1 National	Guarani Wikipedia
Q4627	Aymara	ay:Aymar aru	ay		4000000	2 vulnerable		Aymara Wikipedia
Q13300	Nahuatl	nah:Nawatlahtolli nah:nawatl nah:mexkatl	nah		1925620	2 vulnerable		Nahuatl Wikipedia
Q891085	Wayuu	guc:Wayuunaiki	guc		300000	2 vulnerable	5 Developing	Wayuu Wikipedia
Q33730	Mapudungun	arn:Mapudungun	arn		300000	3 definitely endangered	6b Threatened	Mapuche Wikipedia
Q13310	Navajo	nv:Diné bizaad nv:Diné	nv		169369	2 vulnerable	6b Threatened	Navajo Wikipedia
Q25355	Greenlandic	kl:Kalaallisut	kl		56200	2 vulnerable	1 National	Greenlandic Wikipedia
Q29921	Inuktitut	ike-cans:ᐃᓄᒃᑎᑐᑦ iu:Inuktitut	iu		39770	2 vulnerable		Inuktitut Wikipedia
Q33388	Cherokee	chr:ᏣᎳᎩ ᎧᏬᏂᎯᏍᏗ chr:ᏣᎳᎩ	chr		12300	4 severely endangered	8a Moribund	Cherokee Wikipedia
Q33390	Cree	cr:ᐃᔨᔨᐤ ᐊᔨᒧᐎᓐ' cr:nēhiyawēwin	cr		10875; 8040			Cree Wikipedia
Q32979	Choctaw	cho:Chahta anumpa cho:Chahta	cho		9200	2 vulnerable	6b Threatened	Choctaw Wikipedia
Q56590	Atikamekw	atj:Atikamekw Nehiromowin atj:Atikamekw	atj		6160	2 vulnerable	5 Developing	Atikamekw Wikipedia
Q27183	Iñupiaq	ik:Iñupiatun	ik		5580	4 severely endangered		Inupiat Wikipedia
Q523014	Muscogee	mus:Mvskoke	mus		4300	3 definitely endangered	7 Shifting	Muscogee Wikipedia
Q33265	Cheyenne	chy:Tsêhesenêstsestôtse	chy		2400	3 definitely endangered	8a Moribund	Cheyenne Wikipedia
