= Arapaho language =

Plains Algonquian language of North America

Arapaho
- Hinónoʼeitíít
- Native to: United States
- Region: Wind River Indian Reservation, Wyoming; Oklahoma
- Ethnicity: 5,940 Arapaho
- Native speakers: 1,100 (2015)
- Language family: Algic: Algonquian; Arapahoan; Arapho–Gros Ventre; Arapaho
- Dialects: Besawunena †; Hanahawunena †
- Signed forms: Hand Talk

Language codes
- ISO 639-2: arp
- ISO 639-3: arp
- Glottolog: arap1274
- ELP: Arapaho
- Arapaho is classified as Severely Endangered in Wyoming and Extinct in Oklahoma by the UNESCO Atlas of the World's Languages in Danger.

- Person: Hinono'eino
- People: Hinono'eiteen
- Language: Hinónoʼeitíít, Bee3osohoot
- Country: Hinono'eino' Biito'owu'

Arapaho (endonym: Hinónoʼeitíít), also spelled Arapahoe, is one of the Plains Algonquian languages, closely related to Gros Ventre and other Arapahoan languages. It is spoken by the Arapaho of Wyoming and Oklahoma. Speakers of Arapaho primarily live on the Wind River Indian Reservation in Wyoming, though some have affiliation with the Cheyenne living in western Oklahoma.

== Classification ==
Arapaho is an Algonquian language of the Algic family.

== History ==
By the 1850s, Arapaho bands formed two tribes: the Northern Arapaho and Southern Arapaho. Since 1878 the Northern Arapaho have lived with the Eastern Shoshone on the Wind River Reservation in Wyoming and are federally recognized as the Arapahoe Tribe of the Wind River Reservation. The Southern Arapaho live with the Southern Cheyenne in Oklahoma. Together their members are enrolled as the federally recognized Cheyenne and Arapaho Tribes.

After World War II, the Northern Arapaho tribe tended to use English, not Arapaho, when raising their children. However, Arapaho speakers within the tribe still primarily speak Arapaho amongst each other. The Northern Arapaho additionally have had relatively less intermingling with other tribes and non-Native Americans compared to the Southern Arapaho, who live amongst a predominantly non-Native American population.

== Current status ==
The exact number of Arapaho speakers is not precisely known; however it has been estimated that the language currently retains between 250 and 1,000 active users. Arapaho has limited development outside of the home; however, it is used in some films and portions of the Bible were translated into the language in 1903. According to one source, under 300 people over the age of 50 speak the language in Wyoming, and in Oklahoma the language is used by "only a handful of people [...] all near eighty or older". As of 1996, there were approximately 1,000 speakers among the Northern Arapaho. As of 2008, the authors of a newly published grammar estimated that there were slightly over 250 fluent speakers, plus "quite a few near-fluent passive understanders". In 2008, it was reported that a school had been opened to teach the language to children. Arapaho language camps were held in Summer 2015 at Wind River Tribal College and in St. Stephens, Wyoming. Currently, the language may be acquired by children, for a population estimate as recent as 2007 lists an increase to 1,000 speakers and notes that the language is in use in schools, bilingual education efforts begun on Wind River Reservation in the 1980s and the Arapaho Language Lodge, a successful immersion program, was established in 1993. "The Arapaho Project" is an effort made by the Arapaho people to promote and restore their traditional language and culture. Despite hope for the language, its relatively few active users and the fact that it has seen recent population decreases render Arapaho an endangered language. Ethnologue deems it "moribund".

== Dialects ==
Besawunena, only attested from a wordlist collected by Kroeber, differs only slightly from Arapaho, though a few of its sound changes resemble those seen in Gros Ventre. It had speakers among the Northern Arapaho as recently as the late 1920s.

== Phonology ==
Among the sound changes in the evolution from Proto-Algonquian to Arapaho are the loss of Proto-Algonquian *k, followed by *p becoming either /k/ or /tʃ/; the two Proto-Algonquian semivowels merging to either /n/ or /j/; the change from *s to /n/ in word-initial position, and *m becoming /b/ or /w/ depending on the following vowel. Arapaho is unusual among Algonquian languages in retaining the contrast between the reconstructed phonemes *r and *θ (generally as /n/ and /θ/, respectively). These and other changes serve to give Arapaho a phonological system very divergent from that of Proto-Algonquian and other Algonquian languages, and even from languages spoken in the adjacent Great Basin. Some examples comparing Arapaho words with their cognates in Proto-Algonquian can illustrate this:

Proto-Algonquian	Arapaho	Translation
*erenyiwa	hinén	'man'
*waꞏposwa	nóːku	'hare'
*nepyi	nétʃ	'water'
*weθkweni	hís	'(his) liver'
*mexkaꞏči	wóʔoːθ	'leg'
*siꞏpiꞏwi	níːtʃíː	'river'
*sakimeꞏwa	nóúbeː	'mosquito' > 'fly'
*akweHmi	hóú	'blanket, robe'
*kaꞏkaꞏkiwa	hóuu	'raven' > 'crow'
*aθemwa	héθ	'dog'

=== Vowels ===
Phonetically, Arapaho words cannot begin with a vowel; so where the underlying phonemic form of a word begins with a vowel, a prothetic [h] is added.

Arapaho has a series of four short vowels /i e o u/ (pronounced [ɪ ɛ ɔ ʊ]) and four long vowels /iː eː oː uː/ (written ⟨ii ee oo uu⟩ and pronounced [iː ɛː ɔː uː]). Notably, Arapaho lacks phonemic low vowels. The difference in length is phonemically distinctive: compare hísiʼ, 'tick' with híísiʼ, 'day', and hócoo, 'steak' with hóócoo, 'devil'. /i/ and /u/ are mostly in complementary distribution, as, with very few exceptions, the former does not occur after velar consonants, and the latter only occurs after them. There are some exceptions as in the free variants kokíy ~ kokúy, 'gun'; kookiyón ~ kookuyón, 'for no reason'; and bííʼoxíyoo ~ bííʼoxúyoo, 'Found in the Grass' (a mythological character). There is only one minimal pair to illustrate the contrast in distribution: núhuʼ, 'this' versus níhiʼ-, 'X was done with Y', in which níhiʼ- only occurs in bound form.

In addition, there are four diphthongs, /ei ou oe ie/, and several triphthongs, /eii oee ouu/ as well as extended sequences of vowels such as /eee/ with stress on either the first or the last vowel in the combination.

Short
	Front	Back
Near-close	ɪ ⟨i⟩	ʊ ⟨u⟩
Open-mid	ɛ ⟨e⟩	ɔ ⟨o⟩

Long
	Front	Back
Close	iː ⟨ii⟩	uː ⟨uu⟩
Open-mid	ɛː ⟨ee⟩	ɔː ⟨oo⟩

=== Consonants ===
The consonant inventory of Arapaho is given in the table below.

	Labial	Dental	Alveolar	Palatal	Velar	Glottal
Occlusive	b ⟨b⟩		t ⟨t⟩	t͡ʃ ⟨c⟩	k ⟨k⟩	ʔ ⟨ʼ⟩
Fricative		θ ⟨3⟩	s ⟨s⟩		x ⟨x⟩	h ⟨h⟩
Sonorant			n ⟨n⟩	j ⟨y⟩	w ⟨w⟩	

=== Allophony ===
- /b/ is devoiced [p] before other consonants and word-finally.
- /t tʃ k/ are tenuis [t tʃ k] in most environments, but are aspirated [tʰ tʃʰ kʰ] before other consonants and word-finally, or when preceding a syllable-final sequence of short vowel + /h/. In this same environment /b/ is devoiced and aspirated [pʰ]. For example:
  - the prefix cih- is pronounced [tʃʰɪh];
  - the prefix tih- is pronounced [tʰɪh];
  - the word héétbihʼínkúútiinoo 'I will turn out the lights' is pronounced héét[b̥ʰ]ihʼínkúútiinoo.

=== Syllable structures ===
Syllables tend to have the structure CV((h)C). In general, consonant clusters in Arapaho can only be two consonants long. Consonant clusters do not occur word initially, and /hC/ is the only one that occurs word finally. The only consonant cluster that is "base generated" (phonemic) is /hC/. At the "surface" (phonetically), other clusters arise by phonological processes including vowel syncope, or by juxtaposition of morphemes.

However, vowel-initial onset-less syllables can occur, due to partitioning of vowel clusters. An example of partitioning a cluster of three identical vowels into syllables is ní.ii.non, 'tepee'. The vowel cluster is not always split into short vowel followed by long vowel; the location of the partition depends on Arapaho's complex pitch accent system. For example, another word with a sequence of three vowels, but with a different partitioning of vowels into syllables is hóo.ó. 'bed'.

However, sometimes the vowel cluster does not divide and the whole cluster becomes the nucleus of the syllable. One example is hi.héio, 'his/her aunt (obviative)'.

=== Prosody ===
Arapaho is a pitch accent language. There are two phonemic tones: high (marked with an acute accent) and "normal" (unmarked). The contrast can be illustrated with the pair hónoosóóʼ, 'it is fancy' and honoosóóʼ, 'it is raining'. Long vowels and vowel sequences can carry a contour tone from high to low, as in hou3íne-, 'to hang' (where the first syllable has a normal tone) versus hóu3íne-, "to float" (where the first syllable has a high+normal, or falling, tone). Although tonal contrasts are distinctive in Arapaho, minimal pairs such as those listed above are rare.

== Orthography ==
Arapaho alphabet
IPA
b	tʃ	ɛ	h	ɪ	k	n	ɔ	s	θ	t	ʊ	w	j	ʔ
Grapheme
b	c	e	h	i	k	n	o	s	3	t	u	w	y	’

== Morphology ==
Arapaho is highly synthetic; verbs in particular take a large number of grammatical and semantic morphemes.

=== Inflectional ===
==== Nouns ====
===== Animacy =====
Nouns in Arapaho come in two classes: animate and inanimate. Which category a noun belongs to is part of the lexicon. Being animate does not necessitate "aliveness" (but aliveness does mean animate): doors, planets, ghosts, etc. are considered animate. Some nouns can also be both animate and inanimate, but in these situations, the animate version is more "active" (e.g., a log is inanimate, but a rolling log is animate).

===== Obviation =====
Animate nouns can be made obviative or proximate.

When the underlying noun is consonant final, two general patterns can occur. One pattern occurs for the class of nouns that have /ii/ or /uu/ (depending on vowel harmony) as their plural marker. These nouns reuse the plural marker to mark obviative singular and both obviative and proximate plural. For example, /iwoxuuh/, a stem meaning 'elk,' is hiwóxuu in the proximate singular, but becomes hiwóxuuh-uu in obviative singular, proximate plural, and obviative plural.

The other pattern occurs for most other consonant final noun stems and is summarized in the table below. C denotes the final consonant and the bracketed [C] denotes either consonant mutation of C or deletion of some number of stem-final phonemes. /siisiik/ is 'duck'.

Type	Proximate	Obviative
Singular	[C] (siisííc)	C (siisíík)
Plural	C-o' (siisíík-o’)	C-o (siisíík-o)

For vowel-final stems, the general pattern is a variation of the first consonant final pattern. Namely, a single marker is used to mark all plural forms and the obviative singular form. For example, /ote/, a stem meaning 'sheep, bighorn sheep,' becomes hóte-’ in proximate singular but hóte-ii in both plural forms and the obviative singular.

==== Verbs ====
===== Verb categorization =====
Verbs are divided into classes depending on the transitivity and animacy of their argument(s). Transitivity of a verb affects how many arguments are affixed to the verb. Notice in the examples below the usage of the transitive form requires the addition of INAN, the inanimate marker for the object (the shoes). Verbal inflection also depends on "orders" like imperative.

Intransitive, Animate Subject (AI)

hootóonéénoo wo’óhno.
otoonee-noo wo’ohn-o
IC.buy(AI)-1S shoe-PL
'I am buying shoes.'/'I am shopping for shoes.'

Transitive, Inanimate Object (TI)

hootoonóótowoo wo’óhno.
otoonoot-o-woo wo’ohn-o
IC.buy(TI)-INAN-1S shoe-PL
'I am buying [these] shoes.'

===== Initial change =====
Initial change (IC) can mark tense and aspect (in particular, "present tense and ongoing aspect or present perfect tense and aspect") under affirmative and conjunct orders. Differing phonological changes occur depending on the first vowel of the stem. If the vowel is short, it is lengthened. For example, be’éé- 'to be red' becomes bee’éé’ 'it is red'. Otherwise, an infix is placed before the first vowel. The infix is either /en/ or /on/ and is determined based on harmony with the long vowel. For example, hoowúsee- ('to walk downward') becomes honoowúseenoo ('I am walking downward').

If the first vowel is short and is followed by an /h/, some speakers treat the /h/ as a vowel and use the infix /en/ or /on/ to mark initial change. Other speakers treat the /h/ as a consonant and perform the vowel lengthening process instead.

An irregular form of initial change affects some vowel-initial preverbs by appending an /n/ before the first vowel, rather than the ordinary /h/ that would be prepended to avoid a vowel-initial word. For example, the imperfective /ii/ morpheme becomes nii- instead of the expected hii- when prefixing verbs that would undergo initial change.

===== Agreement =====
In sentences with an explicit noun phrase, separate from the verb, the verb agrees with the noun in terms of animacy, number, and whether the noun is proximate or obviative. The grammatical category, including person, of the noun also needs to agree with the verb. Note that the categories of subject and object do not affect agreement inflection. As an example of animacy agreement, the intransitive verb for 'to fall' has a form that takes an inanimate subject, nihtéésceníse' (PAST-on top-fall(II)-0S) and a form that takes an animate subject, nihtéés'cenísi.

nihtééscenísi’.
nih-teesi-cenisi-’
{PAST-on top-fall(AI)-3}
'It fell on [her].'

If a verb has a single noun argument that is composed of two different types of noun, most speakers default to the obviative (over proximate) and inanimate (over animate) forms to refer to the composite noun argument in case of conflict. This can be seen in the example below where 'walk' takes an argument that is composed of a composite proximate and obviative noun. Both nouns are animate, but there is conflict regarding proximate or obviative. The verb thus defaults to the obviative plural (4PL).

nési noh híbetebihów ceebíseení3i.
ne-si[h] noh i-betebihew-o cebisee-ni3i
1S-uncle(PROX) and 3S-wife-OBV IC.walk(AI)-4PL
'My uncle and his wife are walking by.'

===== Preverbs =====
Like all Algonquian languages, Arapaho has a rich array of preverbs expressing various meanings, in particular manner or aspect. It has one of the richest systems of periodic tense among the world's languages, and the only known system encoding four seasons in the verb morphology. hibernal cecin- 'during winter', vernal benii’ow- 'during the spring', estival biicen- 'during the summer' and autumnal toyoun-'during the fall' (Cowell and Moss 2006:217-218, Jacques 2023:545).

=== Derivational ===
==== Nouns ====
Arapaho has a number of derivational affixes and processes. Some operate on nouns to form verb-like clauses. For example, the morpheme /tohúút/ can prefix a noun to ask 'what kind of <noun>'. A specific example is hoséíno’ ('meat') when prefixed becomes tohúút-oséíno’ ('What kind of meat is this?')

==== Verbs ====
Derivational morphology on verbs can be grouped into abstract and concrete. Abstract morphemes mark transitivity and the animacy of subject/object for the verb. For example, the basic root /be'/ 'red' can be marked with abstract morphemes as follows

1. /be'-ee/ 'to be red', intransitive and takes an inanimate subject
2. /be'-eihi/ 'to be red', intransitive and takes an animate subject

Concrete morphemes tend to add three types of meanings to the verb.

1. patients and undergoers; attach particularly common nouns after a verb with a transitive meaning to give it an object, resulting in an intransitive verb
  - Example: to add /-oox-/ 'wood' as an object, transform it to /-ooxu-/ before appending to verb such as /no’ooxu-/ ('haul wood here') and /cowooxu-/ ('haul wood along')
2. topics concerning nouns that lack volition; examples include body parts, weather and nature, sensations
  - Example: the underlying noun be-sonon ('neck') becomes /-isono-/ before attaching to a verb such as /enisono-/ ('have a long neck')
3. methods of achieving action; examples include tools, means of transportation, non-manmade forces such as wind
  - Example: /-see/ ('walking') can be added to create an AI (animate subject, intransitive) verb such as no’usee- ('to arrive on foot') and oowusee- ('to descend on foot')

==== Reduplication ====
Reduplication is prefixal and is formed by taking the first consonant (if there is one) and the first vowel and then adding /:n/, where the colon indicates that the preceding vowel is elongated. The /n/ is deleted in the presence of a subsequent consonant. For example, cebísee- ('to walk past') after reduplication becomes cée[n]cebísee- ('to walk back and forth past').

There are multiple usages of reduplication in Arapaho including pluralizing implied, secondary, and inanimate objects of (di)transitive verbs; indicating repeating and habitual action (extend the space and time a verb occurs in general), and intensifying. One example of marking repeating action is as follows

tonooto’óótowoo.
toon-to’oot-owoo
IC.REDUP-hit(TI)-1S
'I am hitting it (over and over).'

There can be multiple reduplications in compound words, where each reduplication can have an independent effect. Some verbs appear to be only in a reduplicated form; these verbs tend to describe repeating, iterative action.

== Syntax ==
Arapaho has no canonical word order. Some sentences/clauses consist of only the verb like below.

hoowéentóótiin.
ihoowu-entootiin-i
{NEG-be present(AI.PART)-II.IMPERS}
'No one is home.'

=== Single noun phrase ===
When a sentence contains a verb and a single noun phrase, the noun phrase can either precede or follow the verb. Preposing the noun phrase, however, gives it more importance and salience. Some instances where noun phrases are preposed include introducing a new referent (or reintroducing one that was inactive) and creating contrast.

V-NP order

hení’bebíistiit kohyóhoé.
i’i-bebiisitii-t kohuyohoen-i
IC.INSTR(PREVERB)-fix(AI)-3S glue-SG
'He is fixing it with glue.'

NP-V order (additional context: a new referent, "stone monuments", is being introduced)

3í’eyóóno’ nihbí’eenéntóó3i’.
3i’eyoon-o’ nih-bi’i-eenentoo-3i’
{stone monument-PL} {PAST-only-REDUP.be located(AI)-3PL}
'There were just some stone monuments located there.' [O:Woman Captive, 4]

=== Two noun phrases ===
For a basic sentence with a single verb that takes two noun phrases as arguments, all orderings are possible, but having the verb final is less common.

==== Noun phrase hierarchy ====
A hierarchy exists in determining which noun phrase goes in which position. In the listing below, the first in the pair is treated as "higher" in the hierarchy and tends therefore to be the leftmost NP.

- subject (object)
- proximate (obviative)
- actor (undergoer)
- marked object (unmarked object)
- animate (inanimate)

Subject-verb-object order

he’ííteihí3i heebéhnótnoohóót niitehéíbetíít.
e’iiteihi3i eebeh-notinoohoot niiteheibetiiton-i
someone {POTENT-look for(TI)} help(AI.PART)-SG
'Someone might be looking for help.' [O:Scouts, 64]

Verb-subject-(implied) object order

hé’ih’iixóoxookuséénino núhu’ hó3ii nííne’ééno híí3einóón.
e’ih-ii-xooxookusee-nino nuhu’ o3-ii niine’ee-no ii3einoon-[in]
{NPAST-IMPERF-REDUP.go through(AI)-4PL} this arrow-PL {here is-PL.OBV?} buffalo-OBV.PL
'Their arrows went right through the buffalos.' [O:Scouts, 60]

==== Saliency ====
Saliency determines whether a noun phrase can precede its corresponding verb. Noun phrases are deemed salient if they are referring to something new, something that is being reintroduced, something contrastive, or something that is being emphasized.

Preposed NP (here, the noun phrase meaning 'where the attack was taking place' precedes the verb 'see' to create emphasis)

héetbisíítooni’ nóonoohóotóú’u téí’yoonóh’o’ híseino’.
eetoh-bisiitooni-’ noonoohoot-o’u te’iyoonehe’-o’ isein-o’
where-attack.PART.IMPERS-0S see.REDUP(TI)-3PL child-PL woman-PL
'Women and children watched where the attack was taking place.' [O:Scouts, 70]

Both NPs preceding Verb (uncommon) (additional context: occurs under "contrastive focus")

hoo3óó’o’ téce’ii nih’éí’inóú’u.
oo3oo’o’ tece’-ii nih-e’in-o’u
some night-PL PAST-know(TI)-3PL
'Some knew the nighttime' [O:Eagles, 93]

=== Syntax of noun/verb phrases ===
==== Modifying nouns ====
Generally, noun modifiers occur before the noun. These modifiers additionally tend to occur in a particular order relative each other. For example, in the example below, note that the presentative 'here is' occurs before the demonstrative 'this'

’oh howóó niiyóúno nihíí núhu’ nihíí yóókoxuu.
’oh owoo niiyou-no nihii nuhu’ nihii yookox-ii
but also {here is-PL} well this well willow-PL
'And then there are these, well . . . these, well . . . willows.' [O:Apache Captive, 7]

==== Particles and verb stems ====
Some particles are more closely linked to verbs; these particles generally precede the verb and are often neighboring the corresponding verb.

Particle expressing potential

nooxéíhi’ heesówobéíht.
nooxeihi’ esowobeihi-t
maybe {IC.be sick(AI)-3S}
'Maybe he’s sick.'

Particle expressing recent past

téébe nihno’úseet.
teebe nih-no’usee-t
{just now} PAST-arrive(AI)-3S
'He just now arrived.'

==== Adverbials ====
Adverbials are a type of particle. Unlike other particles in Arapaho, however, they are not a closed class and are instead derived from or composed of other morphemes. One purpose of adverbial construction is to emphasize a morpheme by extracting it from a verb and having it stand alone. Another purpose is to convey meaning outside of what can normally be attached to a verb.

Adverbials are constructed by appending /iihi'/ (which can become /uuhu'/ after vowel harmony) to the end of the root.

A common usage of adverbials is to modify verbs. Adverbials can also act like prepositions and modify noun phrases; such adverbials can occur before or after the noun phrase and are thus exceptions to the rule that nominal modifiers prepose the noun (see example below).

"nih’iicebéso’onóóno’ sósoní’ii néeyóu hoh’éni’ niihííhi’" nih’íí3i’.
nih-ii-cebeso’on-oono’ sosoni’-ii neeyou ohe’en-i’ niih-iihi’ nih-ii-3i’
PAST-IMPERF-chase(TA)-12/3 Shoshone-PL {there it is} mountain-LOC along-ADV PAST-say(AI)-3PL
'“We were chasing the Shoshones along the mountain there,” they said.' [O:Shade Trees, 15]

== Sample text ==
Article 1 of the Universal Declaration of Human Rights in Arapaho:

Beisiihi' hineeniteeno' tohcebii'oo3i' beehni'iine'etii3i', beehnii3inou'u nuhu' neneehiisou'u niihenehiitoono noh bobooteenetiit. Heetnookohuusniini'iheti3i' wootii hiniito'eino hookoh niini'kokoh'u3ecoo3i' noh hee'eihi3i'.

Article 1 of the Universal Declaration of Human Rights in English:

All human beings are born free and equal in dignity and rights. They are endowed with reason and conscience and should act towards one another in a spirit of brotherhood.

== Bibliography ==
- Campbell, Lyle (1997). American Indian Languages: The Historical Linguistics of Native America. Oxford: Oxford University Press. ISBN 0-19-514050-8.
- Conathan, Lisa (2006). "English-Arapaho dictionary (draft)". The Arapaho Language: Documentation and Revitalization Project. University of California at Berkeley.
- Cowell, Andrew; Moss, Alonzo Sr. (2008a). The Arapaho Language. University Press of Colorado. ISBN 978-0-87081-901-8.
- Cowell, Andrew; Moss, Alonzo Sr. (2008b). The Arapaho language. Moss, Alonzo Sr. Boulder: University Press of Colorado. ISBN 9780870819940. OCLC 506069183.
- Cowell, Andrew; Moss, Alonzo Sr. (24 August 2005). Arapaho Historical Traditions: Hinono'einoo3itoono. Univ. of Manitoba Press. ISBN 978-0-88755-312-7. OCLC 940673249.
- Frosch, Dan (16 October 2008). "Its Native Tongue Facing Extinction, Arapaho Tribe Teaches the Young". New York Times.
- Goddard, Ives (1974). "An Outline of the Historical Phonology of Arapaho and Atsina". International Journal of American Linguistics. 40 (2): 102–16. doi:10.1086/465292. S2CID 144253507.
- Goddard, Ives (1990). "Algonquian Linguistic Change and Reconstruction". In Philip Baldi (ed.). Linguistic Change and Reconstruction Methodology. Trends in Linguistics, Studies and Monographs 45. Berlin: Mouton de Gruyter. pp. 99–114.
- Goddard, Ives (2001). "The Algonquian Languages of the Plains". Handbook of North American Indians. Vol. 13. Washington: the Smithsonian Institution. pp. 71–79.
- Greymorning, Steven (2001). "Reflections on the Arapaho Language Project". In Ken Hale; Leanne Hinton (eds.). The Green Book of Language Revitalization in Practice. San Diego, California: Academic Press.
- Hale, Ken (2001). "The Arapaho Language". In Ken Hale; Leanne Hinton (eds.). The Green Book of Language Revitalization in Practice. San Diego, California: Academic Press.
- Kroeber, Alfred Louis (1917). Arapaho dialects. University of California Press.
- Kruse, Babs (1982). Arapaho alphabet. Arapaho language. Vol. 3. Wyoming Indian High School.
- Salzmann, Zdeněk and The Northern Arapaho Tribe and Anderson, Jeffrey. 1998."Dictionary of the Northern Arapaho Language". Archived from the original on 14 February 2012.
