= Puccoon =

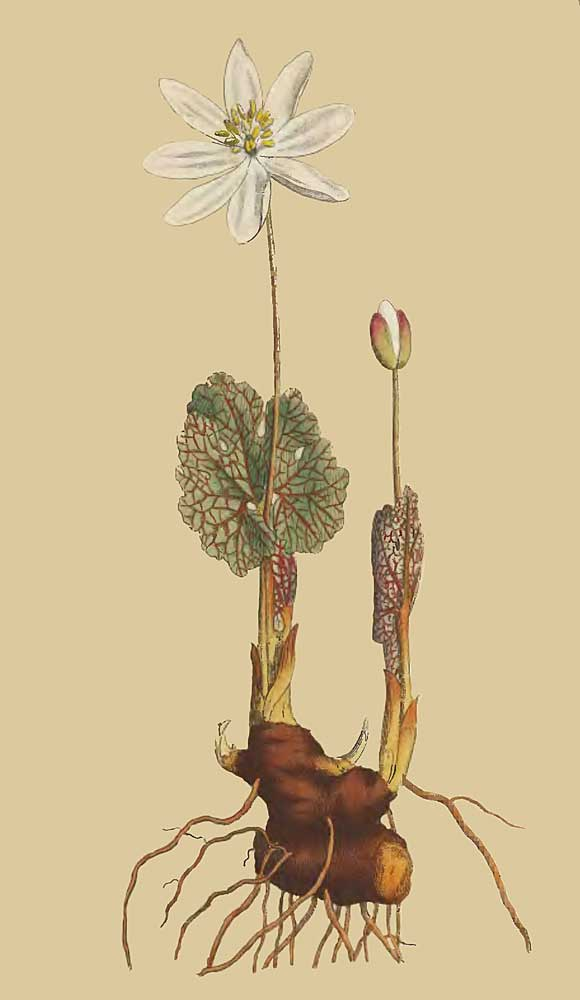
Sanguinaria canadensis. Canada Puccoon, or Bloodwort. From Project Gutenberg's The Botanical Magazine, Vol. V, by William Curtis.

Puccoon /pəˈkuːn/ is a common name that refers to any of several plants formerly used by certain Native Americans for dyes. The dyes were made from the plants' roots.

The name is derived from the Powhatan word poughkone ("red dye").

== Types ==
- Puccoon - Lithospermum ruderale
- Hoary puccoon - Lithospermum canescens
- Narrow-leaved puccoon, fringed puccoon - Lithospermum incisum
- Golden puccoon - Lithospermum caroliniense
  - Hairy puccoon - Lithospermum carolinense var. croceum
- Red puccoon root, Canada puccoon - Sanguinaria canadensis
- Yellow puccoon - Hydrastis canadensis (also called goldenseal)

== See also ==
- Pokeweed
- List of English words from indigenous languages of the Americas#Words from Algonquian languages
