= List of English words from Indigenous languages of the Americas =

This is a list of English language words borrowed from Indigenous languages of the Americas, either directly or through intermediate European languages such as Spanish or French. It does not cover names of ethnic groups or place names derived from Indigenous languages.

Most words of Native American/First Nations language origin are the common names for indigenous flora and fauna, or describe items of Native American or First Nations life and culture. Some few are names applied in honor of Native Americans or First Nations peoples or due to a vague similarity to the original object of the word. For instance, sequoias are named in honor of the Cherokee leader Sequoyah, who lived 2,000 miles (3,200 km) east of that tree's range, while the kinkajou of South America was given a name from the unrelated North American wolverine.

== Words from Algonquian languages ==
Since Native Americans and First Nations peoples speaking a language of the Algonquian group were generally the first to meet English explorers and settlers along the Eastern Seaboard, many words from these languages made their way into English.

In addition, many place names in North America are of Algonquian origin, for example: Mississippi (cf. Miami-Illinois: mihsisiipiiwi and Ojibwe: misiziibi, "great river," referring to the Mississippi River) and Michigan (cf. Miami-Illinois: meehcakamiwi, Ojibwe: Mishigami, "great sea," referring to Lake Michigan). Canadian provinces and U.S. states, districts, counties and municipalities bear Algonquian names, such as Québec, Ottawa, Saskatchewan, Nantucket, Massachusetts, Naugatuck, Connecticut, Wyoming, District of Keewatin, Outagamie County, Wisconsin and Chicago, Illinois, or Algonquian-derived names, such as Algoma.

Furthermore, some indigenous peoples of the Americas groups are known better by their Algonquian exonyms, rather than by their endonym, such as the Eskimo (see below), Winnebago (perhaps from Potawatomi: winpyéko, lit. '(people of the) dirty water'), Sioux (ultimately from Ottawa: naadowesiwag), Assiniboine (Ojibwe: asiniibwaan, lit. 'stone Sioux') and Chipewyan (Cree: čīpwayān, lit. '(those who have) pointed skins or hides').

Apishamore (definition)
From a word in an Algonquian language meaning "something to lie down upon" (cf. Ojibwe apishimon).
Atamasco lily (definition)
Earlier "attamusca", from Powhatan.
Babiche (definition)
From Míkmaq ápapíj (from ápapi, "cord, thread", Proto-Algonquian *aʔrapa·pyi, from *aʔrapy-, "net" + *-a·by-, "string".
Caribou (definition)
From Míkmaq qalipu, "snow-shoveler" (from qalipi, "shovel snow", Proto-Algonquian *maka·ripi-).
Caucus (definition)
The etymology is disputed: two possible sources are an Algonquian word for "counsel", 'cau´-cau-as´u'; or the Algonquian cawaassough, meaning an advisor, talker, or orator.
Chinkapin (definition)
From Powhatan chechinquamins, reconstituted as */t͡ʃiːht͡ʃiːnkweːmins/, the plural form.
Chipmunk (definition)
Originally "chitmunk," from Odawa jidmoonh /t͡ʃɪtmő/ (cf. Ojibwe ajidamoo(nh)), "American red squirrel".
Cisco (definition)
Originally "siscowet," from Ojibwe language bemidewiskaawed "greasy-bodied [fish]".
Cockarouse (definition)
From Powhatan, meaning a leader in certain Native American groups.
Eskimo (definition)
From Old Montagnais aiachkimeou ([aːjast͡ʃimeːw]; modern ayassimēw), meaning "snowshoe-netter" (many times incorrectly claimed to be from an Ojibwe word meaning "eaters of raw [meat]"), and originally used to refer to the Mikmaq.
Hickory (definition)
From Powhatan <pocohiquara>, "milky drink made with hickory nuts".
Hominy (definition)
From Powhatan <uskatahomen>/<usketchaumun>, literally "that which is treated", in this case "that which is ground/beaten".
Husky (definition)
Ultimately from a variant form of the word "Eskimo" (see above).
Kinkajou (definition)
From an Algonquian word meaning "wolverine" (cf. Algonquin kwingwaage, Ojibwe gwiingwa'aage), through French quincajou.
Kinnikinnick (definition)
From Unami Delaware /kələkːəˈnikːan/, "mixture" (cf. Ojibwe giniginige "to mix something animate with something inanimate"), from Proto-Algonquian *kereken-, "mix (it) with something different by hand".
Mackinaw (definition)
From michilmackinac, from Menomini mishilimaqkināhkw, "be large like a snapping turtle", or from Ojibwe mishi-makinaak, "large snapping turtle" with French -ile-, "island".
Moccasin (definition)
From an Algonquian language, perhaps Powhatan <mockasin>, reconstituted as */mahkesen/(cf. Ojibwe makizin, Míkmaq mɨkusun, from Proto-Algonquian *maxkeseni).
Moose (definition)
From Eastern Abenaki moz, reinforced by cognates from other Algonquian languages (e.g. Massachusett/Narragansett moos, Ojibwe moo(n)z, Lenape mus 'elk'), from Proto-Algonquian *mo·swa.
Mugwump (definition)
From "mugquomp", a shortening of Massachusett <muggumquomp>, "war chief" (Proto-Algonquian *memekwa·pe·wa, from *memekw-, "swift" + *-a·pe·, "man").
Mummichog (definition)
From Narragansett moamitteaug, which means “going in crowds.”
Muskellunge (definition)
Ultimately from Ojibwe maashkinoozhe, "ugly pike" (cf. ginoozhe, "pike").
Muskeg (definition)
From Cree maskēk, "swamp" (Proto-Algonquian *maškye·kwi).
Muskrat (definition)
A folk-etymologized reshaping of earlier "musquash", from Massachusett (cf. Western Abenaki mòskwas), apparently from Proto-Algonquian *mo·šk, "bob (at the surface of the water)" + *-exkwe·-, "head" + a derivational ending).
Opossum (definition)
From Powhatan <apasum>/<opussum>/<aposoum>, "white dog-like animal", reconstituted as */aːpassem/ (cf. Proto-Algonquian *waːp-aʔθemwa, "white dog").
Papoose (definition)
From Narragansett <papoòs> or Massachusett <pappouse>, "baby".
Pecan (definition)
From Illinois pakani (cf. Ojibwe bagaan), "nut", from Proto-Algonquian *paka·ni.
Pemmican (definition)
From Cree pimihkān, from pimihkēw, "to make grease" (Proto-Algonquian *pemihke·wa, from *pemy-, "grease" + -ehke·, "to make").
Persimmon (definition)
From Powhatan <pessemins>/<pushemins>, reconstituted as */pessiːmin/. While the final element reflects Proto-Algonquian *-min, "fruit, berry", the initial is unknown.
Pipsissewa (definition)
From Abenaki kpipskwáhsawe, "flower of the woods".
Pokeweed (definition)
Probably from "puccoon" (see below) + "weed".
Pone (definition)
From Powhatan <poan>/<appoans>, "something roasted" (reconstituted as */apoːn/) (cf. Ojibwe abwaan), from Proto-Algonquian *apwa·n.
Powwow (definition)
From Narragansett powwaw, "shaman" (Proto-Algonquian *pawe·wa, "to dream, to have a vision").
Puccoon (definition)
From Powhatan <poughkone>, reconstituted as */pakkan/ (cf. Unami Delaware [pɛːkɔːn], 'red dye; the plant from which dye is made').
Pung
A low box-like sleigh designed for one horse. Shortened form of "tom-pung" (from the same etymon as "toboggan") from an Algonquian language of Southern New England.
Punkie (definition)
Via Dutch, from Munsee [ponkwəs] (Proto-Algonquian *penkwehsa, from *penkw-, "dust, ashes" + *-ehs, a diminutive suffix).
Quahog (definition)
From Narragansett <poquaûhock>.
Quonset hut (definition)
From an Algonquian language of southern New England, possibly meaning "small long place" (with <qunni->, "long" + <-s->, diminutive + <-et>, locative).
Raccoon (definition)
From Powhatan <arahkun>/<aroughcun>, tentatively reconstituted as */aːreːhkan/.
Sachem (definition)
From an Algonquian language of southern New England, cf. Narragansett <sâchim> (Proto-Eastern Algonquian *sākimāw, "chief").
Sagamore (definition)
From Eastern Abenaki sakəma (cf. Narragansett <sâchim>), "chief", from Proto-Eastern Algonquian *sākimāw.
Scup (definition)
Shortened from scuppaug, which is from Narragansett mishcùppaûog.
Shoepac (definition)
From Unami Delaware [t͡ʃipahkɔ] "shoes" (singular [t͡ʃiːpːakw]), altered on analogy with English "shoe".
Skunk (definition)
From Massachusett <squnck> (Proto-Algonquian *šeka·kwa, from *šek-, "to urinate" + *-a·kw, "fox").
Squash (fruit) (definition)
From Narragansett <askútasquash>.
Squaw (definition)
From Massachusett <squa> (cf. Cree iskwē, Ojibwe ikwe), "woman", from Proto-Algonquian *eθkwe·wa.
Succotash (definition)
From Narragansett <msíckquatash>, "boiled whole kernels of corn" (Proto-Algonquian *mesi·nkwete·wari, singular *mesi·nkwete·, from *mes-, "whole" + *-i·nkw-, "eye [=kernel]" + -ete·, "to cook").
Tabagie (definition)
From Algonquin tabaguia.
Tautog (definition)
From Narragansett tautaũog.
Terrapin (definition)
Originally "torope," from an Eastern Algonquian language, perhaps Powhatan (reconstituted as */toːrepeːw/) (cf. Munsee Delaware /toːlpeːw/), from Proto-Eastern Algonquian *tōrəpēw.
Toboggan (definition)
From Míkmaq topaqan or Maliseet-Passamaquoddy /tʰaˈpakən/ (Proto-Algonquian *weta·pye·kani, from *wet-, "to drag" + *-a·pye·-, "cordlike object" + *-kan, "instrument for").
Tomahawk (definition)
From Powhatan <tamahaac> (Proto-Algonquian *temaha·kani, from *temah-, "to cut" + *-a·kan, "instrument for").
Totem (definition)
From Ojibwe nindoodem, "my totem" or odoodeman, "his totem," referring to a kin group.
Tuckahoe (definition)
From Powhatan <tockawhoughe>/<tockwhough>/<taccaho>, "root used for bread", reconstituted as */takwahahk/ (perhaps from Proto-Algonquian *takwah-, "pound (it)/reduce (it) to flour").
Tullibee (definition)
From Old Ojibwe */otoːlipiː/ (modern odoonibii).
Wampum (definition)
Earlier "wampumpeag", from Massachusett, and meaning "white strings [of beads]" (cf. Maliseet: wapapiyik, Eastern Abenaki wápapəyak, Ojibwe waabaabiinyag), from Proto-Algonquian *wa·p-, "white" + *-a·py-, "string-like object" + *-aki, plural.
Wanigan (definition)
From Ojibwa waanikaan, "storage pit".
Wapiti (elk) (definition)
From Shawnee waapiti, "white rump" (cf. Ojibwe waabidiy), from Proto-Algonquian *wa·petwiya, from *wa·p-, "white" + *-etwiy, "rump".
Wickiup (definition)
From Fox wiikiyaapi, from the same Proto-Algonquian etymon as "wigwam" (see below).
Wigwam (definition)
From Eastern Abenaki wìkəwam (cf. Ojibwe wiigiwaam), from Proto-Algonquian *wi·kiwa·Hmi.
Woodchuck (definition)
Reshaped on analogy with "wood" and "chuck", from an Algonquian language of southern New England (cf. Narragansett <ockqutchaun>, "woodchuck").

== Words from Nahuatl ==
Unless otherwise specified, Dictionnaire de la langue nahuatl classique is among the sources used for each etymology

Words of Nahuatl origin have entered many European languages. Mainly they have done so via Spanish. Most words of Nahuatl origin end in a form of the Nahuatl "absolutive suffix" (-tl, -tli, or -li, or the Spanish adaptation -te), which marked unpossessed nouns.

Achiote (definition)
from āchiotl [aːˈt͡ʃiot͡ɬ]
Atlatl (definition)
from ahtlatl [ˈaʔt͡ɬat͡ɬ]
Atole (definition)
from atōlli [ˈaːtoːlli]
Avocado (definition)
from āhuacatl, 'avocado' or 'testicle' [aːˈwakat͡ɬ], via Spanish aguacate and later avocado (influenced by early Spanish abogado 'lawyer')
Axolotl (definition)
āxōlōtl [aːˈʃoːloːt͡ɬ], via Spanish, ultimately from ā-, 'water' + xōlōtl, 'male servant'
Aztec (definition)
from aztecatl 'coming from Aztlan', via Spanish Azteca
Cacao (definition) and Cocoa (definition)
from cacahuatl [kaˈkawat͡ɬ]
Chayote (definition)
from chayohtli [t͡ʃaˈjoʔt͡ɬi]
Chia (definition)
from chiyan [ˈt͡ʃi.jan]
Chicle (definition)
from tzictli [ˈt͡sikt͡ɬi]
Chili (definition)
from chīlli [ˈt͡ʃiːlːi]
Chipotle (definition)
from chilpoctli 'smoked chili', from chili + poctli 'smoke'
Chocolate (definition)
Often said to be from Nahuatl xocolātl or chocolātl, which would be derived from xococ 'bitter' and ātl 'water' (with an irregular change of x to ch). However, the form xocolātl is not directly attested, and chocolatl does not appear in Nahuatl until the mid-18th century. Some researchers have recently proposed that the chocol- element was originally chicol-, and referred to a special wooden stick used to prepare chocolate.
Copal (definition)
from copalli
Coyote (definition)
from coyōtl via Spanish
Elote (definition)
from ēlōtl ('fresh ear of corn') via Spanish
Epazote (definition)
from epazōtl
Guacamole (definition)
from āhuacamōlli, from āhuaca-, 'avocado', and mōlli, 'sauce', via Mexican Spanish
Hoatzin (definition)
from huāctzin
Jicama (definition)
from xicamatl
Mesquite (definition)
from mizquitl [ˈmiskit͡ɬ], via Spanish mezquite
Mezcal (definition)
from mexcalli [meʃˈkalːi] metl [met͡ɬ] and ixcalli [iʃˈkalːi] which mean 'oven cooked agave.'
Mole (definition)
from mōlli [ˈmoːlːi], 'sauce'
Nixtamalization (definition)
from nixtamalli
Nopal (definition)
from nohpalli [noʔˈpalːi], 'prickly pear cactus', via American Spanish
Ocelot (definition)
from ocēlōtl [oːˈseːloːt͡ɬ] 'jaguar', via French
Ocotillo (definition)
from ocotl 'pine, torch made of pine', via Mexican Spanish ocote + diminutive -illo
Peyote (definition)
from peyōtl [ˈpejoːt͡ɬ]. Nahuatl probably borrowed the root peyō- from another language, but the source is not known.
Pinole (definition)
from pinolli, via Spanish
Quetzal (definition)
from quetzalli [keˈt͡salːi], 'quetzal feather'.
Sapodilla (definition)
from tzapocuahuitl
Sapota (definition)
from tzapotl [ˈt͡sapot͡ɬ]
Shack (definition)
possibly from xahcalli [ʃaʔˈkalːi], 'grass hut', by way of Mexican Spanish.
Sotol (definition)
from tzotolli
Tamale (definition)
from tamalli [taˈmalːi], via Spanish tamal. The Spanish plural is tamales, and the English derives from a false singular tamale.
Tequila
from téquitl 'work' + tlan 'place'
Tlacoyo (definition)
from tlahtlaōyoh [t͡ɬɑʔt͡ɬɑˈoːjoʔ]
Tomato (definition)
from tomatl [ˈtomat͡ɬ], via Spanish tomate. The change from tomate to tomato was likely influenced by the spelling of potato
Tule (definition)
from tōllin [ˈtoːlːin], 'reed, bulrush'

== Words from Quechua ==
Unless otherwise specified, Words in English from Amerindian Languages is among the sources used for each etymology

A number of words from Quechua have entered English, mostly via Spanish, adopting Hispanicized spellings.

Ayahuasca (definition)
from aya "corpse" and waska "rope", via Spanish ayahuasca
Cachua (definition)
from qhachwa
Chinchilla (definition)
possibly from Quechua. May be from Spanish chinche
Chuño (definition)
from ch'uñu
Coca (definition)
from kuka, via Spanish coca
Cocaine (definition)
from kuka (see above), probably via French cocaïne
Condor (definition)
from kuntur, via Spanish cóndor
Gran Chaco (definition)
from chaku, "hunt"
Guanaco (definition)
from wanaku
Guano (definition)
from wanu via Spanish guano
Inca (definition)
from Inka "lord, king"
Jerky (definition)
from ch'arki, via Spanish charquí
Lagniappe (definition)
from yapay, "add, addition", via Spanish la yapa (with the definite article la).
Lima (definition)
from rimay, "speak" (from the name of the city, named for the Rimaq river ("speaking river"))
Llama (definition)
from llama, via Spanish
Lucuma (definition)
from lukuma, via Spanish
Mashua (definition)
from maswa
Pampa (definition)
from pampa, "a large plain", via Spanish
Pisco (definition)
from pisqu, "bird"
Puma (definition)
from puma, via Spanish
Quinine (definition)
from kinakina, via Spanish quina
Quinoa (definition)
from kinwa, via Spanish quinoa
Quipu (definition)
from khipu, via Spanish quipo
Soroche (definition)
from suruqchi or suruqch'i, "Altitude sickness"
Vicuña (definition)
from wik'uña, via Spanish vicuña
Viscacha (definition)
from wisk'acha, via Spanish vizcacha

== Words from Eskaleut languages ==
Anorak (definition)
from Greenlandic Inuit annoraaq
Chimo (definition)
from the Inuktitut word saimo (ᓴᐃᒧ Inuktitut pronunciation: [sa.iˈmo], a word of greeting, farewell, and toast before drinking. Used as a greeting and cheer by the Canadian Military Engineers, and more widely in some parts of Southern Ontario and Western Canada, particularly in Saskatoon, Saskatchewan
Igloo (definition)
from Inuktitut iglu (ᐃᒡᓗ Inuktitut pronunciation: [iɣˈlu])
Ilanaaq (definition)
Inuktitut ilanaaq (ᐃᓚᓈᒃ Inuktitut pronunciation: [ilanaːk]), "friend". Name of the logo for the 2010 Winter Olympics
Inuksuk (definition)
from Inuktitut inuksuk (ᐃᓄᒃᓱᒃ Inuktitut pronunciation: [inukˈsuk])
Kayak (definition)
from Inuktitut qajaq (ᖃᔭᖅ Inuktitut pronunciation: [qaˈjaq])
Malamute (definition)
from Inupiaq Malimiut, the name of an Inupiaq subgroup
Mukluk (definition)
from Yupik maklak ([makɬak]), "bearded seal"
Nanook (definition)
from Inuktitut word for polar bear Nanuq (ᓇᓄᒃ Inuktitut pronunciation: [naˈnuq]), "polar bear", made famous in English due to a 1922 documentary Nanook of the North, featuring a man with this name.
Nunatak (definition)
from Greenlandic Inuit nunataq
Tiktaalik (definition)
from Inuktitut tiktaalik (ᑎᒃᑖᓕᒃ Inuktitut pronunciation: [tiktaːlik]), "large freshwater fish"
Umiaq (definition)

== Words from Arawakan languages ==
Anole (definition)
from an Arawakan language, or possibly Cariban, via French anolis.
Barbecue (definition)
from an Arawakan language of Haiti barbakoa, "framework of sticks", via Spanish barbacoa.
Buccaneer (definition)
from an Arawakan language buccan, "a wooden frame on which Taínos and Caribs slowly roasted or smoked meat", via French boucane.
Cacique or cassique (definition)
from Taíno cacike or Arawak kassequa "chieftain"
Caiman (definition)
from a Ta-Maipurean language, "water spirit" (cf. Garifuna [aɡaiumã]), though possibly ultimately of African origin.
Canoe (definition)
from Taíno via Spanish canoa.
Cassava (definition)
from Taíno caçabi, "manioc meal", via Spanish or Portuguese.
Cay (definition)
from Taíno, via Spanish cayo.
Guaiac (definition)
from Taíno guayacan via Spanish and Latin.
Guava (definition)
from an Arawakan language, by way of Spanish guayaba.
Hammock (definition)
from Taíno, via Spanish hamaca.
Hurricane (definition)
from Taíno hurakán, via Spanish.
Iguana (definition)
from an Arawakan language iwana.
Macana (definition)
from Taíno macana via Spanish.
Maize (definition)
from Taíno mahís, via Spanish.
Mangrove (definition)
from Taíno, via Spanish mangle or Portuguese mangue.
Papaya (definition)
from Taíno.
Potato (definition)
from Taíno or Haitian Carib batata 'sweet potato', via Spanish patata.
Savanna (definition)
from Taíno zabana, via Spanish.
Tobacco (definition)
probably from an Arawakan language, via Spanish: tabaco.
Yuca (definition)
from Taíno, via Spanish.

== Words from Tupi-Guaraní ==
Acai (definition)
from Tupi *ɨβasaí, via Brazilian Portuguese assaí, uaçaí, açaí.
Ani (definition)
from Tupi *anúʔí.
Agouti (definition)
from Tupi–Guaraní akutí, via Portuguese aguti through French.
Cashew (definition)
from Tupí acaîu, via Portuguese caju.
Capybara (definition)
from Guaraní kapibári 'the grass eater ' via Portuguese capivara through French.
Catupiry (definition)
from Guaraní katupyry via Brazilian Portuguese.
Cayenne (definition)
from Tupí kyinha via French.
Cougar (definition)
ultimately corrupted from Guaraní guaçu ara.
Jaguar (definition)
from Tupinambá via Portuguese jaguar through French /jaˈwar-/,.
Jaguarundi (definition)
from Guaraní via Portuguese.
Maraca (definition)
from Tupí maraka via Portuguese.
Macaw (definition)
via Portuguese Macau from Tupi macavuana, which may be the name of a type of palm tree the fruit of which the birds eat.
Manioc (definition)
from Tupinambá via Portuguese man(d)ioca through French /maniˈʔok-/.
Petunia (definition)
from Tupí petun 'smoke' via Portuguese.
Piranha (definition)
from Tupí pirã́ja, pirã́nʸa, from pirá 'fish' + ã́ja, ã́nʸa 'tooth', via Portuguese.
Seriema (definition)
from Tupinambá siriema 'the crested one' via Portuguese
Tapioca (definition)
from Tupinambá /tɨpɨˈʔok-a/ 'juice squeezed out', from tipi 'residue, dregs' + og, ok 'to squeeze out', via Portuguese.
Tapir (definition)
from Tupinambá via Portuguese tapir through French /tapiˈʔir-/.
Tegu (definition)
from Tupinambá teiú-guaçú 'big lizard' via Portuguese teiú
Toucan (definition)
from Tupinambá via Portuguese tucano through French /tuˈkan-/, via Portuguese and French.

== Words from other indigenous languages of the Americas ==
Abalone (definition)
from Rumsen awlun and Ohlone aluan, via Spanish abulón.
Alpaca (definition)
from Aymara allpaka, via Spanish.
Appaloosa (definition)
Either named for the Palouse River, whose name comes from Sahaptin palú:s, "what is standing up in the water"; or for Opelousas, Louisiana, which may come from Choctaw api losa, "black body".
Barracuda (definition)
from Spanish, perhaps originally from Carib.
Bayou (definition)
from early Choctaw bayuk, "creek, river", via French.
Camas (definition)
from Nez Perce qémʼes.
Cannibal (definition)
via Spanish Caníbalis, from a Cariban language, meaning "person, Indian", (Proto-Cariban *karípona), based on the Spaniards' belief that the Caribs ate human flesh.
Catalpa (definition)
from Creek katałpa "head-wing", with (i)ká, "head" + (i)táłpa, "wing".
Cenote (definition)
from Yucatec Maya dzonot or ts'onot meaning "well".
Cheechako (definition)
from Chinook Jargon chee + chako, "new come". Chee comes from Lower Chinook čxi, "straightaway", and for chako cf. Nuuchahnulth čokwaa, "come!"
Chicha
via Spanish from Guna chichab, "maize" or from Nahuatl chichiatl, "fermented water."
Chinook (definition)
from Lower Chehalis tsʼinúk, the name of a village, via Chinook Trade Jargon.
Chuckwalla (definition)
from Cahuilla čáxwal.
Coho (definition)
from Halkomelem k̉ʷə́xʷəθ ([kʷʼəxʷəθ]).
Coontie (definition)
from Creek conti hetaka.
Coypu (definition)
from Mapudungun coipu, via American Spanish coipú.
Degu (definition)
from Mapudungun deuñ, via Spanish.
Divi-divi (definition)
from Cumanagoto.
Dory (definition)
from Miskito dóri, dúri.
Eulachon (definition)
from a Cree adaptation of Chinook Trade Jargon ulâkân, itself a borrowing of Clatsap u-tlalxwə(n), "brook trout".
Gaucho (definition)
via Spanish, probably from a South American indigenous language, cf. Araucanian cauchu 'wanderer'.
Geoduck (definition)
from Lushootseed (Nisqually) gʷídəq.
Guan (definition)
from Guna kwama.
High muckamuck (definition)
from Chinook Jargon [ˈmʌkəmʌk], "eat, food, drink", of unknown origin.
Hogan (definition)
from Navajo hooghan.
Hooch (definition)
a shortening of "Hoochinoo", the name of a Tlingit village, from Tlingit xutsnuuwú, "brown bear fort".
Kachina (definition)
from Hopi katsína, "spirit being".
Jojoba (definition)
via Spanish, from some Uto-Aztecan language, cf. O'odham hohowai and Yaqui hohoovam.
Kiva (definition)
from Hopi kíva (containing ki-, "house").
Kokanee (definition)
perhaps from Twana kəknǽxw.
Manatee (definition)
via Spanish manatí, from a word in a Cariban language meaning "(woman's) breast".
Ohunka
from Lakota "false", "untrue".
Peccary (definition)
from Galilbi Carib pakira.
Piki (definition)
from Hopi.
Pogonip (definition)
from Shoshone /pakɨnappɨ/ ([paˈɣɨnappɨ̥]), "fog".
Poncho (definition)
from Mapudungun pontho "woolen fabric", via Spanish.
Potlatch (definition)
from Nuuchahnulth (Nootka) p̉aƛp̉ač ([pʼatɬpʼat͡ʃ], reduplication of p̉a, "to make ceremonial gifts in potlatch", with the iterative suffix -č) via Chinook Jargon.
Salal (definition)
from Chinook Trade Jargon [səˈlæl], from Lower Chinook salál.
Saguaro (definition)
via Spanish, from some indigenous language, possibly Opata.
Sasquatch (definition)
From Halkomelem [ˈsæsqʼəts].
Sego (definition)
from Ute-Southern Paiute /siˈkuʔa/ ([siˈɣuʔa]).
Sequoia (definition)
from a Cherokee personal name, <Sikwayi>, with no further known etymology.
Sockeye (definition)
from Halkomelem /ˈsθəqəʔj/.
Skookum (definition)
from Chinook Jargon [ˈskukəm], "powerful, supernaturally dangerous", from Lower Chehalis skʷəkʷə́m, "devil, anything evil, spirit monster".
Tamarin (definition)
from a Cariban language, via French.
Tipi (definition)
from Lakota thípi, "house".
Tupelo (definition)
Perhaps from Creek ’topilwa, "swamp-tree", from íto, "tree" + opílwa, "swamp".
Wapatoo (definition)
from Chinook Jargon [ˈwapato], "arrowroot, wild potato", from Upper Chinook [wa]-, a noun prefix + [pato], which comes from Kalapuyan [pdóʔ], "wild potato".
Wakinyan (definition)
from Lakota wa, "people/things" + kiŋyaŋ, "to fly".
Yaupon (definition)
from Catawba yąpą, from yą, "wood/tree" + pą, "leaf".

== See also ==
- List of place names of Indigenous origin in the Americas
  - List of place names of Indigenous origin in Canada
  - List of place names of Indigenous origin in the United States
    - List of place names of Indigenous origin in New England
- List of Spanish words of Indigenous American origin
- List of Spanish words of Nahuatl origin

== Bibliography ==
- Bright, William (2004). Native American Place Names of the United States. Norman: University of Oklahoma Press
- Campbell, Lyle (1997). American Indian Languages: The Historical Linguistics of Native America. Oxford: Oxford University Press
- Flexner, Stuart Berg and Leonore Crary Hauck, eds. (1987). The Random House Dictionary of the English Language [RHD], 2nd ed. (unabridged). New York: Random House.
- Siebert, Frank T. (1975). "Resurrecting Virginia Algonquian from the Dead: The Reconstituted and Historical Phonology of Powhatan". In Studies in Southeastern Indian Languages, ed. James M. Crawford, pp. 285–453. Athens: University of Georgia Press
