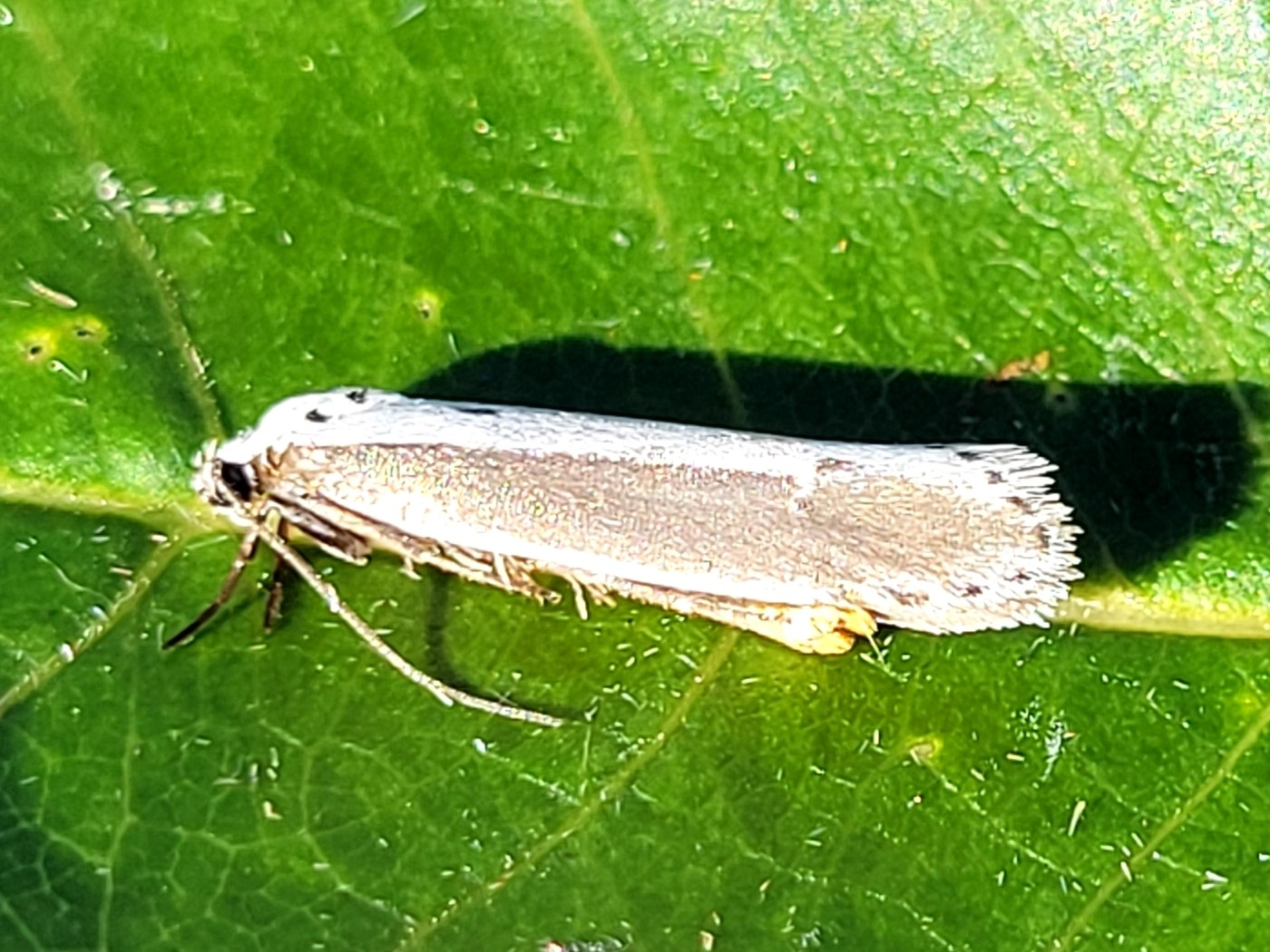

Scientific classification
- Domain: Eukaryota
- Kingdom: Animalia
- Phylum: Arthropoda
- Class: Insecta
- Order: Lepidoptera
- Family: Depressariidae
- Genus: Ethmia
- Species: E. albicostella

Binomial name
- Ethmia albicostella (Beutenmuller, 1889)

Synonyms
- Psecadia albicostella Beutenmuller, 1889

= Ethmia albicostella =

Species of moth

Ethmia albicostella is a species of moth in the family Depressariidae. It is a widespread species in the Rocky Mountains and Sierra Madre Occidental of Mexico, ranging from southern Manitoba, Saskatchewan, and Montana through the southern Rocky Mountain states at moderately high elevations and mountains of western Mexico at least south to Durango.

The length of the forewings is 10.5–13.2 mm (0.41–0.52 in). The ground color of the forewings is divided by a straight longitudinal line. The costal half is dark to pale brownish gray, darkest at the dividing line, blending to whitish at the costa. The dorsal area is white, lightly tinged with grayish and marked by a single small, oblong, dark spot at the basal one-fourth. The ground color of the hindwings is pale brownish, but slightly darker apically. Adults are on wing from mid June to early August.

The larvae feed on Lithospermum species.
