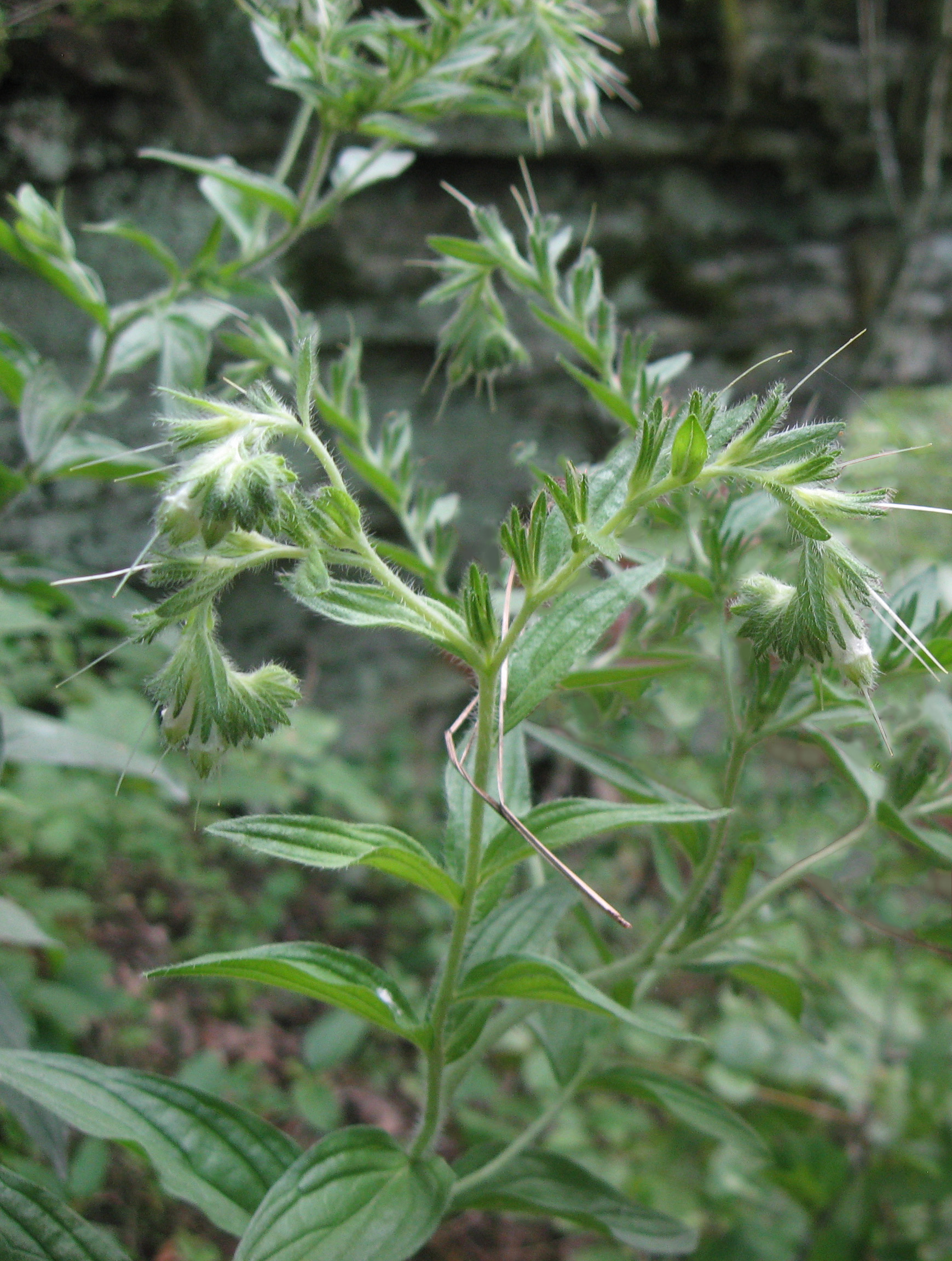

Scientific classification
- Kingdom: Plantae
- Clade: Embryophytes
- Clade: Tracheophytes
- Clade: Spermatophytes
- Clade: Angiosperms
- Clade: Eudicots
- Clade: Asterids
- Order: Boraginales
- Family: Boraginaceae
- Genus: Lithospermum
- Species: L. parviflorum

Binomial name
- Lithospermum parviflorum Weakley, Witsell, & D. Estes

Synonyms
- Onosmodium hispidissimum Mackenzie

= Lithospermum parviflorum =

Species of flowering plant in the borage family

Lithospermum parviflorum, commonly called Eastern Prairie Marbleseed, is a species of flowering plant in the forget-me-not family. It is native to the eastern North America.

This species is a robust perennial. It produces a cyme of cream colored flowers in late spring and early summer.

Although widespread, this species is spotty and uncommon throughout much of its range. Its preferred habitat, somewhat dry calcareous woodlands, barrens, and glades, has been heavily impacted by agriculture and other land-use changes. The only area this species is considered secure in is the Ridge and Valley region of Virginia and West Virginia. In Kentucky, this species has disappeared from many previously known localities since the 1980s. In Missouri, it has been known to be in decline since the 1950s.

It can be distinguished from the similar looking Lithospermum bejariense by having shorter corollas (6–10 mm) and nutlets that form a collar around the base. It can be distinguished from the cedar glade endemic Lithospermum molle by having leaves with erect pustular-based hairs. Some rare collections from southern Kentucky appear to be intermediate with Lithospermum molle.
