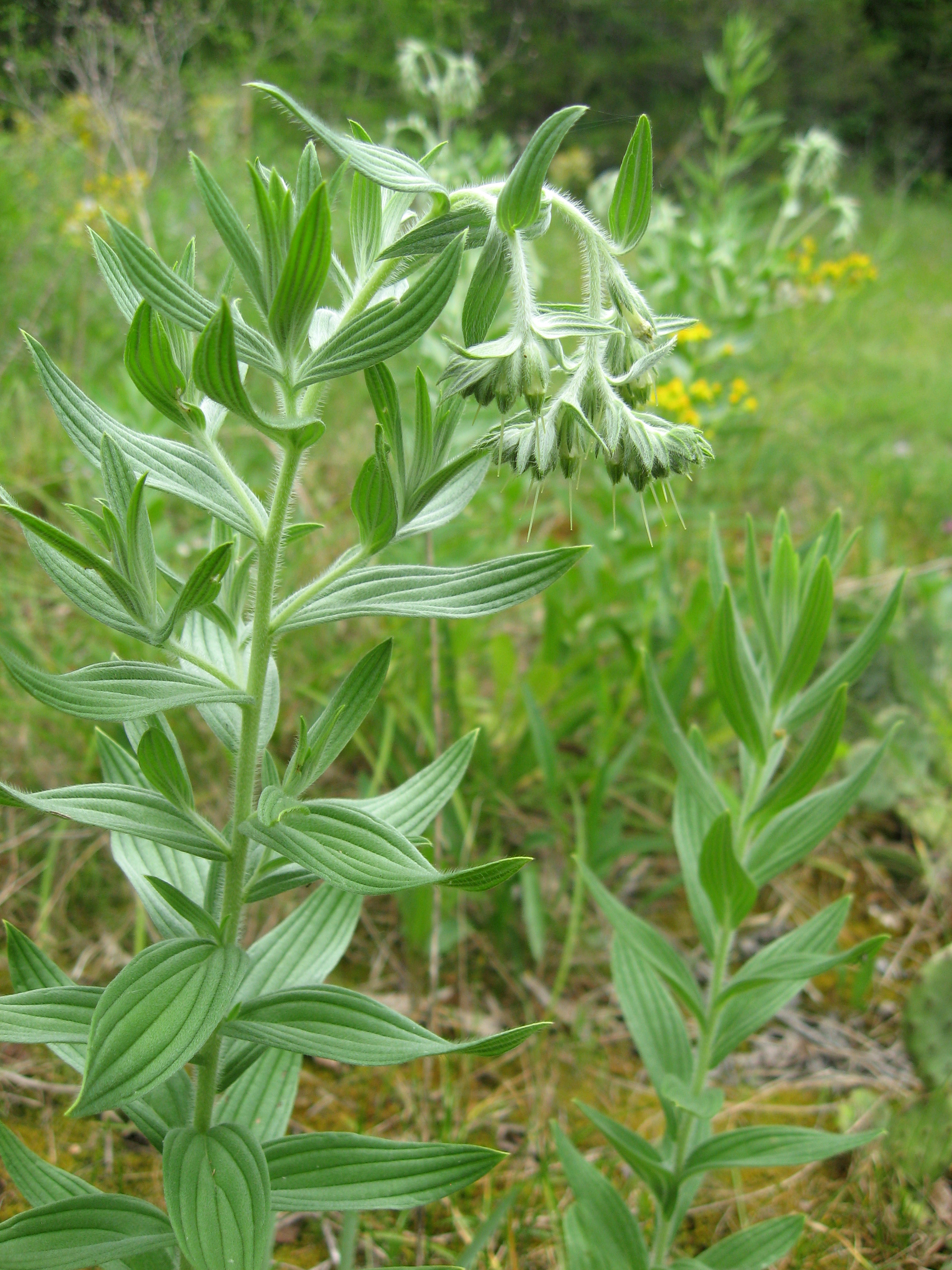

Conservation status
- Vulnerable (NatureServe)

Scientific classification
- Kingdom: Plantae
- Clade: Embryophytes
- Clade: Tracheophytes
- Clade: Spermatophytes
- Clade: Angiosperms
- Clade: Eudicots
- Clade: Asterids
- Order: Boraginales
- Family: Boraginaceae
- Genus: Lithospermum
- Species: L. molle

Binomial name
- Lithospermum molle (Michx.) Muhl.

Synonyms
- Onosmodium molle

= Lithospermum molle =

Species of flowering plant in the borage family

Lithospermum molle, the softhair marbleseed, is a species of flowering plant in the forget-me-not family. This species is a narrow endemic, native primarily to the Nashville Basin of Tennessee, where it is found in limestone prairies near cedar glades. There are disjunct populations in similar habitats in the Ozark Mountains of Missouri, in northwest Alabama, in Logan and Warren County, Kentucky as well as other small areas of Tennessee. Outside of Tennessee, it is very rare and perhaps no longer exists in Alabama and Kentucky due to habitat destruction. Because of its highly restricted geographic range, this species is considered vulnerable.

This species has been long confused with Lithospermum bejariense, Lithospermum parviflorum, and Lithospermum virginianum, and its true geographic range and morphological distinctiveness are only recently being clarified.
