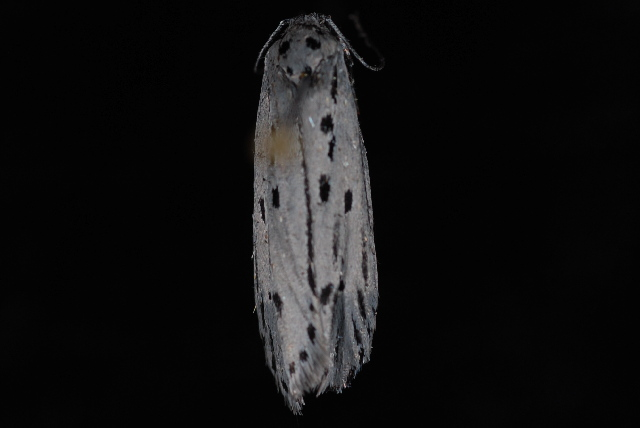

Scientific classification
- Kingdom: Animalia
- Phylum: Arthropoda
- Clade: Pancrustacea
- Class: Insecta
- Order: Lepidoptera
- Family: Depressariidae
- Genus: Ethmia
- Species: E. monticola

Binomial name
- Ethmia monticola (Walsingham, 1880)

Synonyms
- Psecadia monticola Walsingham, 1880; Psecadia fuscipedella Walsingham, 1888; Ethmia fuscipedella

= Ethmia monticola =

Species of moth

Ethmia monticola, the gray ethmia moth, is a moth in the family Depressariidae. It is found in North America from British Columbia and Alberta to California and Arizona, east at least to North Dakota and Colorado.

The length of the forewings is 10.8–15.3 mm (0.43–0.60 in). The ground color of the forewings is pale to dark slate gray. The markings are black, conspicuous and variable. The ground color of the hindwings is pale to dark gray. Adults are on wing from May to July.

The larvae of subspecies fuscipedella feed on Lithospermum canescens and Lithospermum gmelini. They live in a slight web.

== Subspecies ==
- Ethmia monticola monticola (widespread in boreal western North America from Alberta, west through southern British Columbia and most of Washington, south through western Montana and Wyoming into northern Utah, Idaho and the mountains of California)
- Ethmia monticola emmeli Powell, 1973 (southern Rocky Mountains and adjoining mountain ranges)
- Ethmia monticola fuscipedella (Walsingham, 1888) (widespread in eastern North America, from New York, southern Ontario and southern Manitoba, south to Kansas and south-central New Mexico)
