= Ethmia mirusella =

Scientific classification
- Kingdom: Animalia
- Phylum: Arthropoda
- Clade: Pancrustacea
- Class: Insecta
- Order: Lepidoptera
- Family: Depressariidae
- Genus: Ethmia
- Species: E. mirusella

Binomial name
- Ethmia mirusella (Chambers, 1874)

Synonyms
- Anesychia mirusella Chambers, 1874

Species of moth

Ethmia mirusella is a moth in the family Depressariidae. It is found in the United States from Kansas and Oklahoma to central and western Texas.

The length of the forewings is 7.8–9.2 mm (0.31–0.36 in). The ground color of the forewings is white, the pattern divided by a longitudinal, straight line. The area costad in the cell is dark brown, shading to pale brownish and whitish toward the costa, the latter is brown only at the base. The costal area beyond the cell is mostly white. The ground color of the hindwings is white, at times very lightly tinged with grayish brown towards the distal margins. Adults are on wing in March and from May to September in two generations per year.

The larvae feed on Lithospermum species.
