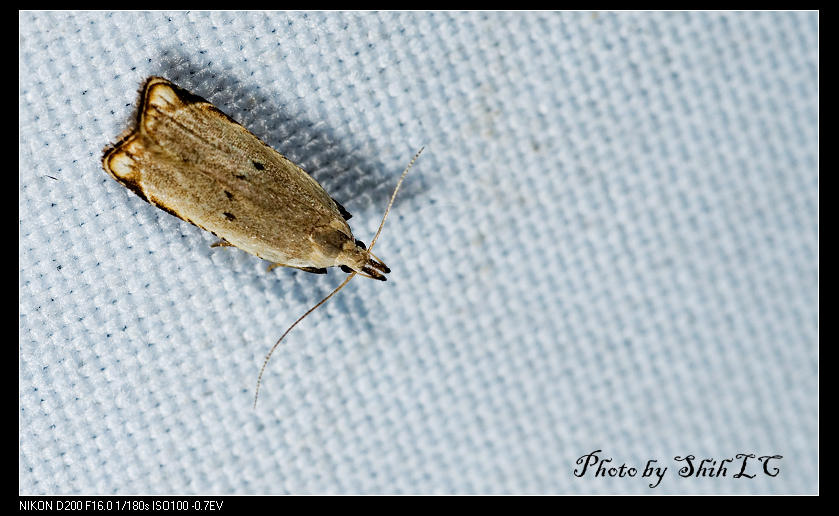

Scientific classification
- Kingdom: Animalia
- Phylum: Arthropoda
- Class: Insecta
- Order: Lepidoptera
- Family: Gelechiidae
- Genus: Dichomeris
- Species: D. autometra

Binomial name
- Dichomeris autometra (Meyrick, 1934)

Synonyms
- Cymotricha autometra Meyrick, in Caradja & Meyrick, 1934

= Dichomeris autometra =

Species of moth

Dichomeris autometra is a moth of the family Gelechiidae. It was described by Edward Meyrick in 1934. It is known from Taiwan and Sichuan, China.

The wingspan is 6-6.3 mm.

The larvae feed on Lithospermum species.
