= Frank Siebert =

American pathologist and linguist (1912–1998)

- Born: Frank Thomas Siebert, Jr. April 2, 1912; Louisville, Kentucky, U.S.
- Died: January 23, 1998 (aged 85); Bangor, Maine, U.S.
- Burial place: West Laurel Hill Cemetery, Bala Cynwyd, Pennsylvania
- Education: Haverford College (B.S.); University of Pennsylvania Medical School (M.D.)
- Occupation: Pathologist
- Spouse: Marion Paterson (m. 1956; div. 1964)
- Children: 2

Frank Thomas Siebert Jr. (April 2, 1912 – January 23, 1998) was an American pathologist who became a leading authority on Algonquian languages, including Penobscot, for which he compiled a dictionary.

== Early life ==
Siebert was born in Louisville, Kentucky, on April 2, 1912, and spent the first five years of his life in Nashville, Tennessee. In 1917, his family moved first to Philadelphia and then to Merion Station, Pennsylvania, where he grew up.

He attended Haverford College, studying chemistry and graduating in 1934. He first met Penobscot communities in 1932 when he was nineteen years old.

== Professional career ==
Siebert started as a medical pathologist before leaving medicine to focus on linguistics. He studied medicine at the medical school of the University of Pennsylvania graduating in 1938. Apart from his medical studies at Penn, he attended the linguistic talks and seminars given by Franz Boas at Columbia and Edward Sapir at Yale, while working to attain his M.D. degree at Penn. He was further influenced by anthropologist Frank Speck in his interest in Native American languages.

In 1936, he was mentored by Mary R. Haas of Berkeley, when they traveled together to Maine for two and a half weeks to document Penobscot language and music. There, Hass developed an annotation and documentation system for documenting Penobscot pitches and musical traditions.

He subsequently worked on projects to reconstitute Virginia Algonquian (Powhatan) based on previously collected William Strachey transcriptions from the early seventeenth century. He developed a phonological system for the language, including a "91 etymological vocabulary that spells out 263 English glosses" as well as a subclassification of early Eastern Algonquian, and naming at least fifty dialects. In “The Original home of the Proto-Algonquian people,” Siebert explored vocabularies for flora and fauna, and also made arguments for Algonquian people's place of origin. He worked to document Penobscot language, producing a two-volume draft Penobscot dictionary in 1984 (1,235 pages with nearly 15,000 entries).

In 1969, he became a Guggenheim fellow.

In 1980, he received a grant from the National Endowment for the Humanities for the creation of a Penobscot dictionary, a project that he had been working on since at least 1968.

Ives Goddard of the Smithsonian Institution called Siebert "clearly the most brilliant and most competent avocational linguist working on Native American languages that there has ever been, hands down." Karl Teeter, commenting on Siebert, called him "the dean of Algonquian linguistics".

== Personal life ==
In 1956, he married Marion Paterson, with whom he had two daughters. The marriage broke down in 1961, and divorce followed in 1964.

He was described as an eccentric and recluse. He collected rare books.

== Death ==
Siebert died in Bangor, Maine, on January 23, 1998, at the age of 85, after suffering for several years from cancer of the urinary tract and ensuing complications. He was buried with his mother and father at West Laurel Hill Cemetery in Bala Cynwyd, Pennsylvania.

Following his death, his collection of books and antiquarian items was sold at Sotheby's for $12.5 million, which was split between his two daughters. His dictionary and field-work materials were bequeathed to the American Philosophical Society.
