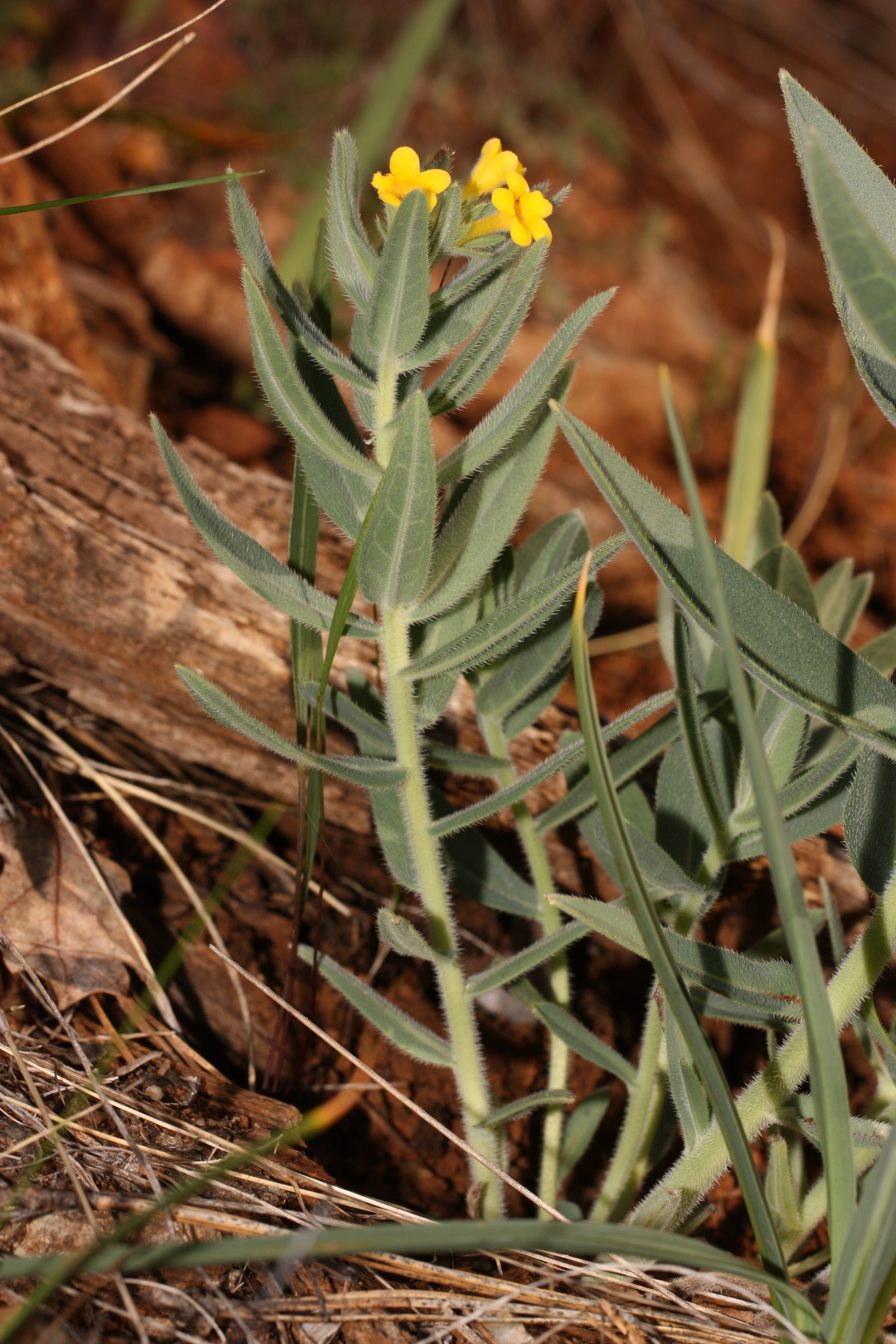

Scientific classification
- Kingdom: Plantae
- Clade: Tracheophytes
- Clade: Angiosperms
- Clade: Eudicots
- Clade: Asterids
- Order: Boraginales
- Family: Boraginaceae
- Genus: Lithospermum
- Species: L. californicum

Binomial name
- Lithospermum californicum A.Gray

= Lithospermum californicum =

Species of flowering plant in the borage family Boraginaceae

Lithospermum californicum is a species of flowering plant in the borage family known by the common name California stoneseed. It is native to southern Oregon and northern California, where it can be found in many types of mountain habitat, such as forest, woodland, and chaparral, sometimes on serpentine soils.

== Description ==
It is a hairy perennial herb growing from a taproot and woody caudex. It produces a clump of branching, spreading stems up to about 40 centimeters long. The stems are lined with widely lance-shaped, lightly hairy leaves up to 5 centimeters long. The flowers appear near the ends of the stem branches, each with a calyx of narrow, pointed sepals. The corolla is bright golden yellow and nearly a centimeter wide at the mouth.
