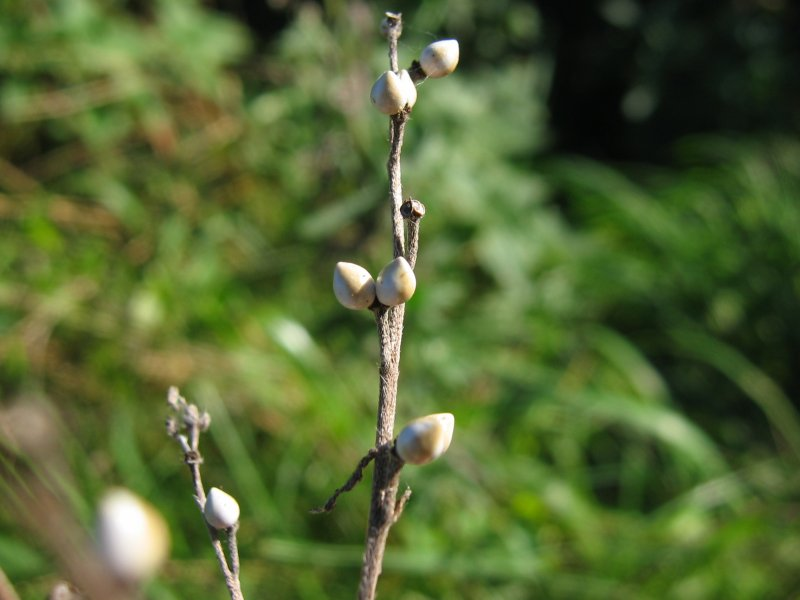

Scientific classification
- Kingdom: Plantae
- Clade: Embryophytes
- Clade: Tracheophytes
- Clade: Spermatophytes
- Clade: Angiosperms
- Clade: Eudicots
- Clade: Asterids
- Order: Boraginales
- Family: Boraginaceae
- Genus: Lithospermum
- Species: L. officinale

Binomial name
- Lithospermum officinale L.

= Lithospermum officinale =

Species of flowering plant in the borage family

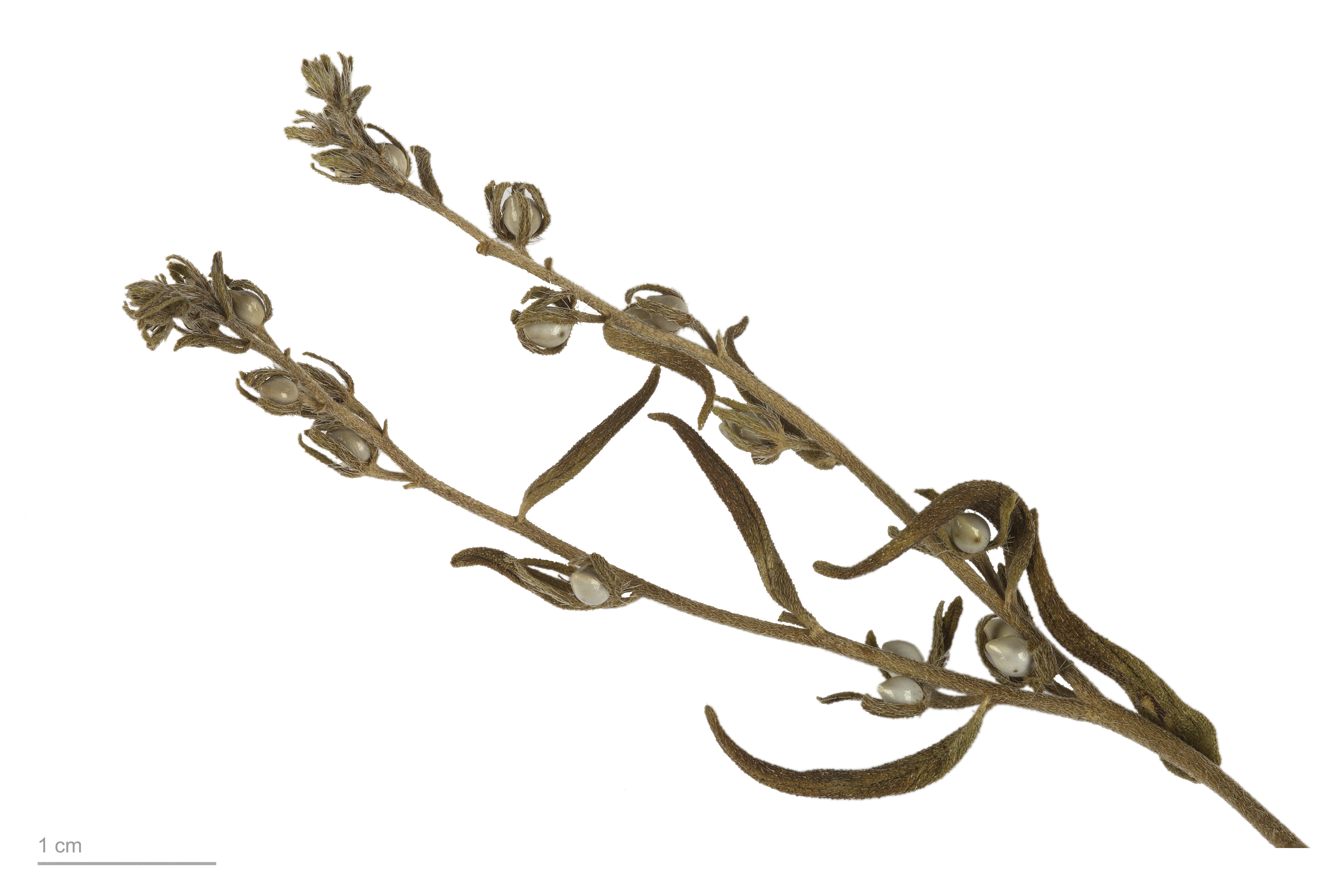
Lithospermum officinale

Lithospermum officinale, or common gromwell or European stoneseed, is a flowering plant species in the family Boraginaceae, native to Eurasia. It is the host plant for caterpillars of the monophagous moth Ethmia dodecea.

== Description ==
Common gromwell is an erect, downy perennial plant growing up to 60–80 cm (24–31 in) tall. The unstalked, lanceolate leaves grow up to 10 cm (3.9 in) long and are strongly marked with lateral veins below.

The greenish white, funnel-shaped flowers, appearing June–July, measure 3–4 mm across and are borne in short, dense cymose clusters within the leaf axils. When in fruit, the inflorescences form a V-shaped, elongated spray. The fruits comprise 4 shiny white nutlets that measure 3–4 mm long and persist well into winter.

== Habitat and distribution ==
The plant is very widely distributed throughout Europe and Asia. It is locally common in the UK, where it is much rarer in the north and west of the country. The favoured habitat includes grassland, scrubland, and open woodland, usually on base-rich and calcareous soils.

== In culture and human use ==
All parts of the plant have been traditionally used as a natural medicinal remedy for various ailments. In India for example, the leaves were once used as a sedative, while the seeds have been administered as a diuretic, lithotritic, febrifuge, anti-gout, anti-ovulary and anti-toxic agent as well as an anti-inflammatory for diseases of the urinary tract and for promoting digestion. A herbal tea made from the root and stem, or a decoction of the roots and twigs was once given in the form of a syrup to remedy smallpox and measles. The tea also served as an antipruritic.

Archaeological findings from a gravesite in Poland unearthed a plaster poultice containing the nutlets of L. officinale. The plant has been found to be a potent natural anti-inflammatory and effective agent for healing burn wounds when applied topically, which explains the presence of this species in the poultice discovered.

L. officinale also appears to have held important cosmetic and ornamental value. For example, the roots were once used for colouring fibres and to produce makeup dye. Elsewhere, the well-preserved, intact fruits were found glued onto two wooden tubs found in the Yanghai Tombs of Xinjiang, China, from about 2,500 years ago. These nutlets probably had decorative worth. Their lustrous, porcelain-like appearance as well as their hardness also made them suitable and popular for use as beads in Bulgaria and central Europe as far back as the Neolithic period.
