= Lithospermum azuayense =

Scientific classification
- Kingdom: Plantae
- Clade: Embryophytes
- Clade: Tracheophytes
- Clade: Spermatophytes
- Clade: Angiosperms
- Clade: Eudicots
- Clade: Asterids
- Order: Boraginales
- Family: Boraginaceae
- Genus: Lithospermum
- Species: L. azuayense

Binomial name
- Lithospermum azuayense Weigend & Nürk, 2010

Species of flowering plant in the borage family

Lithospermum azuayense is a flowering plant of the family Boraginaceae found in Ecuador.
