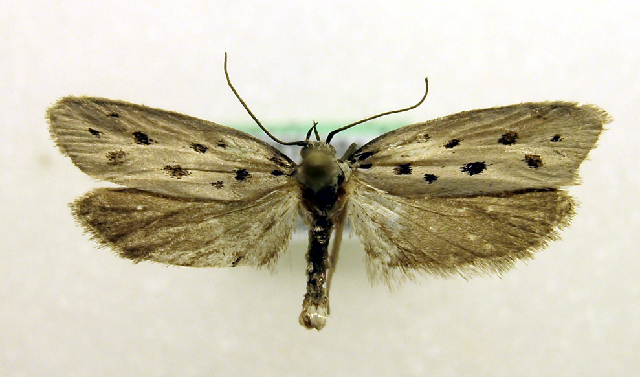

Scientific classification
- Kingdom: Animalia
- Phylum: Arthropoda
- Clade: Pancrustacea
- Class: Insecta
- Order: Lepidoptera
- Family: Depressariidae
- Genus: Ethmia
- Species: E. dodecea

Binomial name
- Ethmia dodecea (Haworth, [1828])

Synonyms
- Erminea decemguttella (Hübner, [1810]); Erminea dodecea Haworth, [1828] Melanoleuca dodecca (lapsus); Melanoleuca dodecea (Haworth, [1828]); Melanoleuca dodocea (lapsus); Psecadia dezemguttella (lapsus); Tinea decemguttella Hübner, [1810]: Ethmia decemgutella (lapsus)

= Ethmia dodecea =

Species of moth

Ethmia dodecea is a moth of the family Depressariidae. It is found in Europe, Asia Minor, Iran, the south-western, southern and eastern European parts of Russia, the Caucasus, Transcaucasia, western Kazakhstan and Siberia.

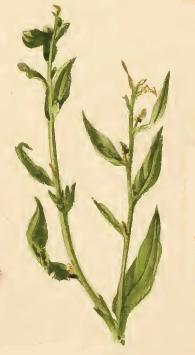
A sprig of Lithospermum officinale eaten by larva

Larva

Its wingspan is 17–21 mm (0.67–0.83 in). The moth flies from May to August depending on the location.

The larvae feed on Lithospermum officinale.
