= Ohunka =

Type of history of the Sioux

Ohunka (Lakota: false, untrue, plural ohunkakan) is a traditional Sioux evening story. They usually feature mythological characters like Iktomi or Iya together with humans. The storyteller's skill required the combination of episodes and keeping the audience interested. Some ohunkakan were collected by Zitkala-Sa in her Old Indian Legends.
