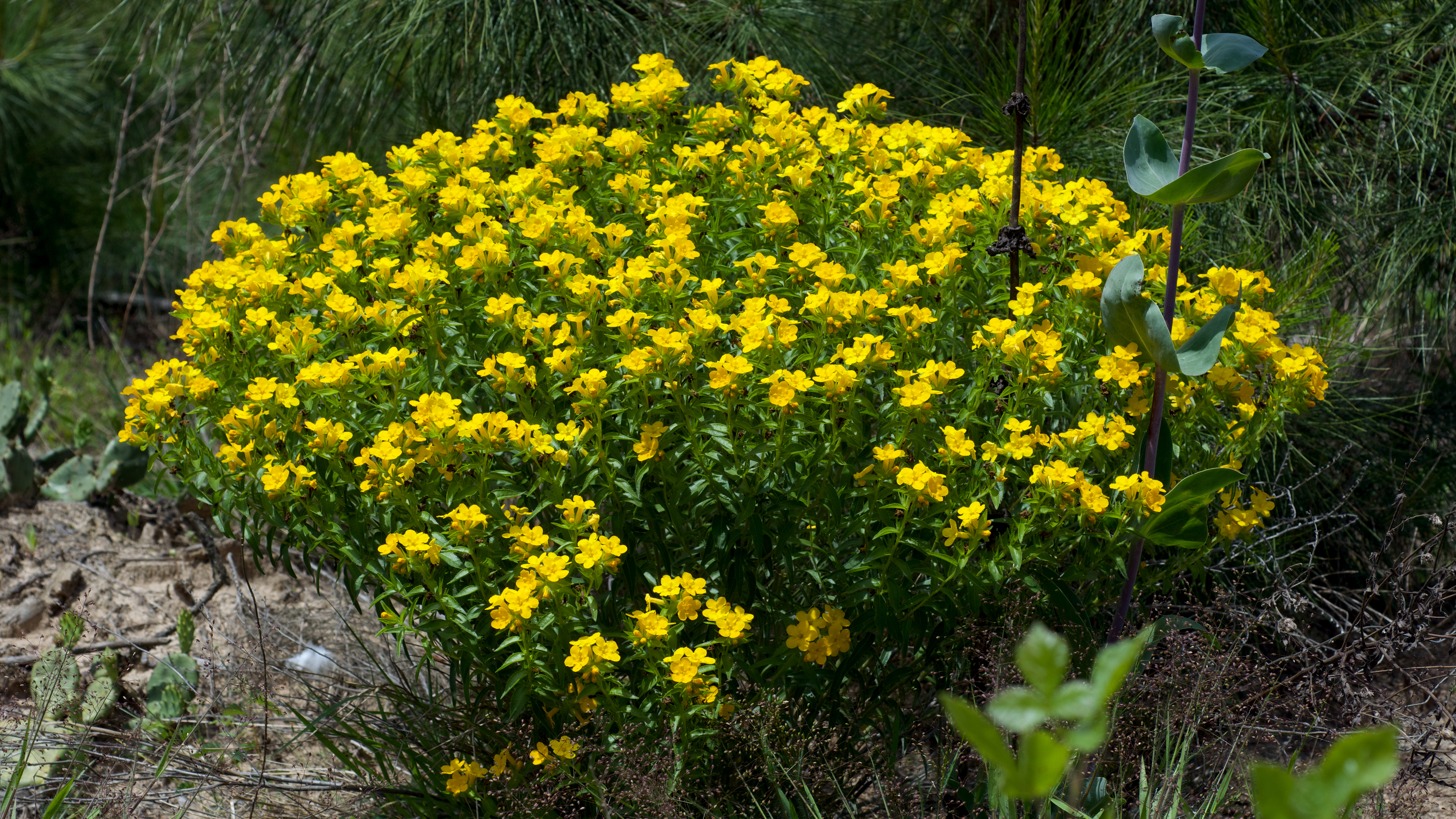
- In Nevada County, Arkansas

Conservation status
- Apparently Secure (NatureServe)

Scientific classification
- Kingdom: Plantae
- Clade: Embryophytes
- Clade: Tracheophytes
- Clade: Spermatophytes
- Clade: Angiosperms
- Clade: Eudicots
- Clade: Asterids
- Order: Boraginales
- Family: Boraginaceae
- Genus: Lithospermum
- Species: L. caroliniense

Binomial name
- Lithospermum caroliniense (Walter ex J.F. Gmel.) MacMill.

= Lithospermum caroliniense =

North American species of flowering plant in the borage family

Lithospermum caroliniense, commonly known as the hairy puccoon or Carolina puccoon or Plains puccoon, is a flowering plant found in the Midwestern United States and Canadian provinces surrounding the Great Lakes. The plant grows in sandhills, pine barrens, and dry, sandy woods.

== Description ==
Dr. Robert W. Poole and Dr. Patricia Gentili describe the hairy puccoon as follows:

Flowers large (up to 1 inch in diameter) yellow-orange with 5 petals and basal parts of petals fused into a long corolla tube. Stamens hidden in corolla tube. Flowers arranged in a flat-topped cluster or weakly curled, short sprays. Stem and leaves coarsely hairy. Leaves broadest in the middle, tapering at either end, and outer margin smooth. Plant 1 to 2.5 feet in height.

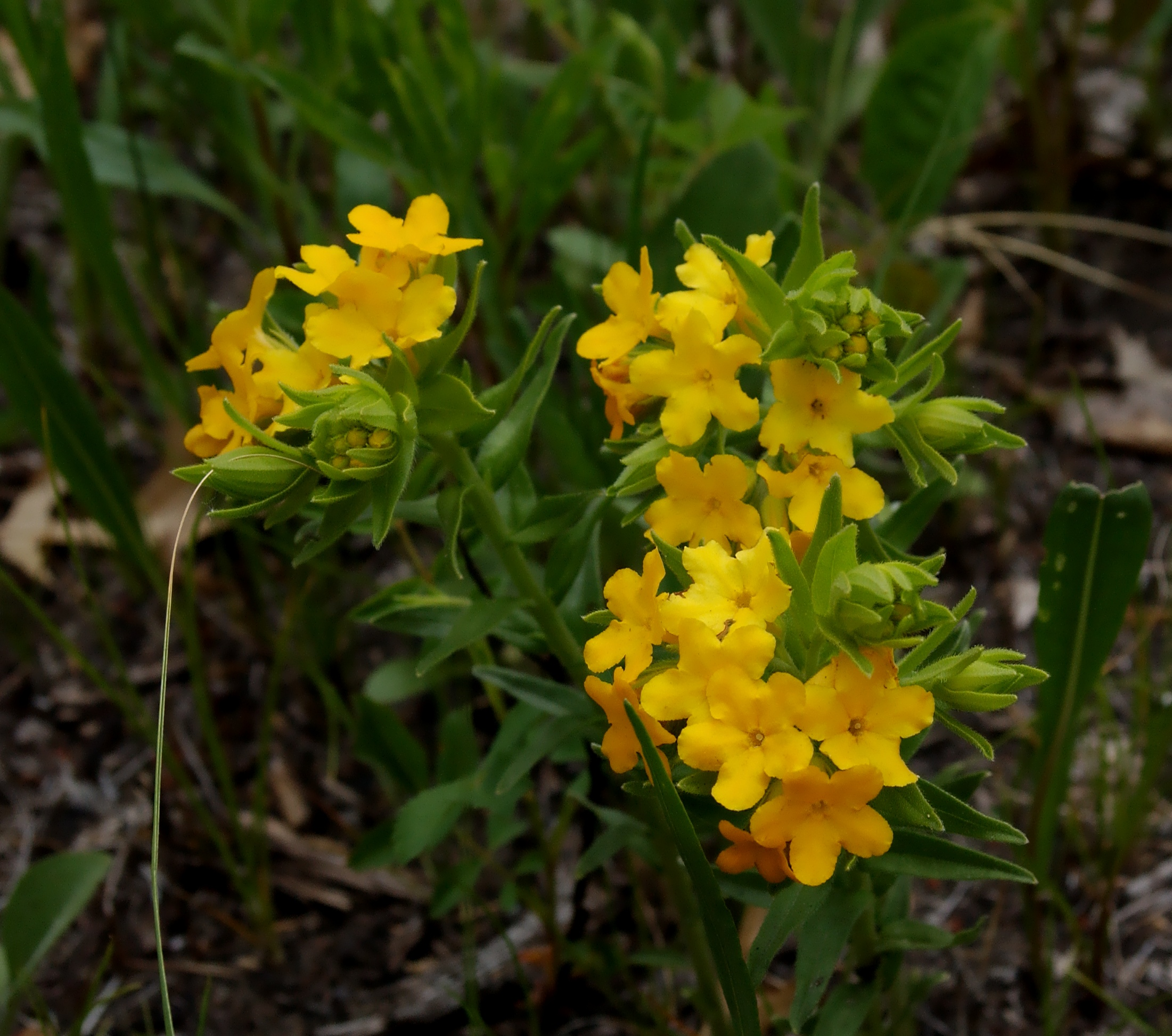
Flowers of hairy puccoon at Illinois Beach State Park

== Cultivation and uses ==
To cultivate Lithospermum caroliniense a warm sunny position in a moderately fertile well-drained lime-free sandy soil is needed.

A red dye is obtained from the dried or pulverized roots. The powdered root has also been used in the treatment of chest wounds.
