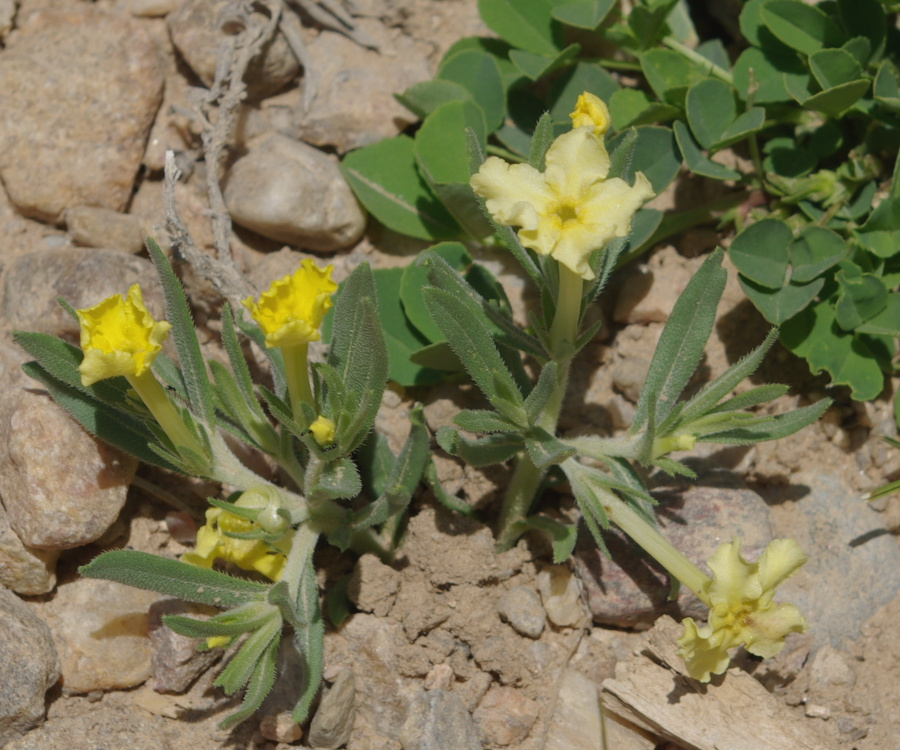

Conservation status
- Secure (NatureServe)

Scientific classification
- Kingdom: Plantae
- Clade: Embryophytes
- Clade: Tracheophytes
- Clade: Spermatophytes
- Clade: Angiosperms
- Clade: Eudicots
- Clade: Asterids
- Order: Boraginales
- Family: Boraginaceae
- Genus: Lithospermum
- Species: L. incisum

Binomial name
- Lithospermum incisum Lehm.

Synonyms
- List: Batschia longiflora Pursh; Cyphorima longiflora Raf.; Lithospermum longiflorum (Pursh) Spreng.; Pentalophus longiflorus (Pursh) DC.; Batschia decumbens Nutt.; Cyphorima angustifolia Nieuwl.; Cyphorima decumbens (Nutt.) Raf.; Cyphorima linearifolia Lunell; Cyphorima mandanensis (Spreng.) Lunell; Heliotropium helianthemoides Shuttlew. ex A.DC.; Lithospermum albicans Greene; Lithospermum angustifolium Michx.; Lithospermum asperum A.Nelson; Lithospermum breviflorum Engelm. & A.Gray; Lithospermum breviflorum var. punctulatum Engelm.; Lithospermum ciliolatum Greene; Lithospermum decumbens (Nutt.) Torr.; Lithospermum helianthemoides Shuttlew. ex DC.; Lithospermum linearifolium Goldie; Lithospermum longiflorum var. mirabile Brand; Lithospermum mandanense Spreng.; Lithospermum multiflorum S.Watson; Lithospermum oblongum Greene; Pentalophus mandanensis (Spreng.) DC.

= Lithospermum incisum =

Species of flowering plant in the borage family

Lithospermum incisum is a species of flowering plant in the borage family. It is known by several common names, including fringed gromwell, fringed puccoon, narrowleaf stoneseed, narrowleaf puccoon, and plains stoneseed.

== Description ==
It is a hairy perennial herb growing from a narrow brown to black taproot and woody caudex. It produces a cluster of stems up to about 30 centimetres (12 in) long. The stems are lined with narrow, pointed leaves up to 6.5 cm (2 1/2 in) long.

Blooming from May to July, the slender, trumpet-shaped flowers are pale to bright yellow or gold. They may approach 4 cm (1 1/2 in) long, while the corolla face is 1 to 2 cm wide, its lobes sometimes ruffled. The smaller cleistogamous (closed) flowers are the main producers of seed. The fruit comprises four nutlets, each some 3 millimetres (1/8 in) long.

== Distribution and habitat ==
It is native to much of central and western Canada and the United States, where it can be found in dry open areas and foothills and pinyon–juniper woodland.

== Cultivation ==
Fringed gromwell reacts badly to being transplanted while actively growing, the leaves often turning black. It is less damaged if transplanted when dormant, taking as much of the pencil sized roots as possible. They grow best in very sandy, well draining soils, though they do grow in soils with some loam or clay.

== Uses ==
Used medicinally by Native Americans, the ground leaves roots and stems were rubbed on the limbs to reduce paralysis. Among the Zuni people, a salve of the powdered root applied ceremonially to swelling of any body part. A poultice of root is used and decoction of the plant is taken for swelling and sore throat. The powdered root mixed with bum branch resin and used for abrasions and skin infections. An infusion of the root is taken for stomachache and kidney problems.

The leaves are bound to arrow shafts, close to the point, obscured by sinew wrapping and used in wartime.
