= Powhatan language =

Indigenous language of Tidewater Virginia

Powhatan
- Kikitowämak
- Native to: Virginia
- Region: Tidewater Virginia
- Ethnicity: Powhatan
- Extinct: 1785-1790s
- Revival: 21st century
- Language family: Algic: Algonquian; Eastern; Powhatan
- Writing system: Latin

Language codes
- ISO 639-3: pim
- Glottolog: powh1243

Powhatan or Virginia Algonquian is an Eastern Algonquian language part of the Algonquian language family. It was formerly spoken by the Powhatan people of tidewater Virginia.

The sole documentary evidence for this language is two short wordlists recorded around the time of first European contact. William Strachey recorded about 500 words and Captain John Smith recorded only about 50 words. Smith also reported the existence of a pidgin form of Powhatan, but virtually nothing is known of it. Strachey's material was collected sometime between 1610 and 1611, and probably written up from his notes in 1612 and 1613, after he had returned to England. It was never published in his lifetime, although he made a second copy in 1618. The second copy was published in 1849, and the first in 1955. Smith's material was collected between 1607 and 1609 and published in 1612 and again in 1624. There is no indication of the location where he collected his material. Like many Algonquian languages, Powhatan did not have a writing system, so all that is left are the writings from the 17th century and the piecing together that can be done using related Algonquian languages.

Following 1970s linguistic research by Frank Thomas Siebert, Jr., some of the language has been reconstructed with assistance from better-documented Algonquian languages, and attempts are being made to revive it.

Although the language went dormant, the tribes today are working with the newer generation on learning it.

== Classification ==
Powhatan is an Algic language. It is closely related to Unami, Munsee, Nanticoke, Massachusett, and other Eastern Algonquian languages, is more distantly related to Ojibwe, Cree, Cheyenne, Blackfoot, and other Algonquian languages, and is most distantly related to Wiyot and Yurok.

=== Historical phonological changes ===
Based on his work to reconstruct Powhatan, Siebert was able to compare the changes that the language might have made compared to Proto-Algonquian and Proto-Eastern Algonquian. Here are three of the most basic changes his research pinpointed:

- All syllabic phonemes are the same in between Proto-Eastern Algonquian and Powhatan and the only change between those two and Proto-Algonquian is that word initial /ɛ/ became an /a/ in Powhatan and Proto-Eastern Algonquian. Ex: PA */ɛšpeːwi/ "it is high" → aspēw [ʌsˈpeːw].
- Word final vowels are deleted if they are preceded by a consonant between Proto-Algonquian and Powhatan. Ex: PA */myeːneθki/ "earthwork" → mēnesk [ˈmeːnesk].
- Powhatan drops the difference between /s/ and /š/ that is found in Proto-Algonquian. Similarly, PA /l/ becomes a /ɾ/ in Powhatan, unless it in a word final position of a particle or inflectional morphemes, where it is deleted. Furthermore PA /θ/ becomes a /t/. Ex: PA */šiːˀšiːpa/ "duck" → siyssiyp [ˈsiːssiːp]; PA */leːkawi/ "sand" → rēkaw [ˈɾeːkʌw]; PA */aθemwehša/ "little dog" → atemoss [ʌˈtɛmʊss].

== History ==
=== Pre-colonial history ===
The Powhatan language formed from a split from other Eastern Algonquian languages, and southward moving groups replaced earlier cultures in the area as the language became more distinct. There is no certainty as to whether or not Carolina Algonquian was a distinct language from Powhatan, as there is little attestation for most languages in the region. For example, the Machapunga of North Carolina are originally from Virginia.

=== European contact ===
The first Europeans to encounter the Powhatan were the Spanish. They gave this region the name Ajacán, and they may have sailed up the Potomac River; however, Spanish colonization ultimately failed in this area.

English colonists arrived in 1607 with Captain John Smith, and established the settlement of Jamestown. Smith recorded only about 50 words in Powhatan, but William Strachey, a writer and fellow colonist, managed to record about 500 words. Because at this time Powhatan was still the dominant language, and because during the early years the English colonists were dependent on the Powhatan for food, the colonists had to learn the newly encountered language.

The English language started borrowing many words from Powhatan; the language has been credited with being the source of more English loans than any other indigenous language. Most such words were likely borrowed very early, probably before conflict arose between the Powhatan and the colonists in 1622.

Among these words are: chinquapin (Castanea pumila), chum (as in chumming), hickory, hominy, matchcoat, moccasin, muskrat, opossum, persimmon, pokeweed, pone (as in corn pone), raccoon, terrapin, tomahawk, and wicopy.

As English colonists continued to expand into Powhatan territory, the reverse began to happen: Powhatan people now had to learn English. In his Notes on the State of Virginia (1782), Thomas Jefferson mentioned there being some 12 pure-blooded Pamunkey, of which "the older ones preserve their language in a small degree, which are the last vestiges of the Powhatan language". It had likely vanished by 1790.

=== Modern era ===
In recent decades there has been an interest in reviving the lost language, especially by the descendants of the Powhatan Confederacy. In 1975, Frank Siebert, a linguist specializing in Algonquian languages, published a book-length study claiming the "reconstitution" of the phonology of the language.

For the film The New World (2005), which tells the story of the English colonization of Virginia and encounter with the Powhatan, Blair Rudes made a tentative reconstruction of the language "as it might have been."

A specialist in the Indigenous languages of North Carolina and Virginia, he used the Strachey and Smith wordlists, as well as the vocabularies and grammars of other Algonquian languages and the sound correspondences that appear to obtain between them and Powhatan. More specifically, he used a Bible translated into Massachusett to piece together grammar and Proto-Algonquian to compare the words in Smith and Strachey's records.

== Dialects ==
Siebert's 1975 study also examined evidence for dialect variation. He found insufficient justification for assigning any apparent dialects to particular areas. Strachey's material reflects considerable lexical variation and minor phonological variation, suggesting the existence of dialect differentiation. A speculative connection to the Chickahominy and Pamunkey languages has been suggested, but no evidence has been found to support this link.

The table below gives a sample of words reflecting lexical variation. Each word is given as written by Smith or Strachey, followed by a proposed phonemic representation.

Powhatan words representing two dialects
English	Dialect A orthographic	Dialect A transcription	Dialect B orthographic	Dialect B transcription
sun	⟨keshowghes⟩, ⟨keshowse⟩	kiysowss	⟨nepausche⟩	nepass
roe	⟨woock⟩	wāhk	⟨vsecān⟩	osiykān
copper	⟨osawas⟩	osāwāss	⟨matassun⟩, ⟨matassin⟩	matassen
he is asleep	⟨nuppawv̄⟩, ⟨nepauū⟩	nepēw	⟨kawwiu⟩	kawiyo
(his) thigh	⟨apome⟩	opowm	⟨wÿkgwaus⟩	wiykkoay
arrow	⟨attonce⟩	atowns	⟨asgweowan⟩	askoiwān
muskrat	⟨osasqaws⟩	ossaskoēss	⟨mosskwacus⟩	mossaskoēss
raccoon	⟨aroughcan⟩	ārēhkan	⟨esepannauk⟩ (plural)	ēsepan

== Phonology ==
=== Consonants ===
This table is based on Frank T. Siebert's reconstruction of the Powhatan language. He used the notes of John Smith but relied primarily on the work of William Strachey recorded between 1610 and 1611. Siebert also used his knowledge of the patterns of other Algonquian languages in determining the meaning of Strachey's notes. This table provides the practical symbols along with their IPA equivalents, in brackets.

Powhatan Consonants
	Bilabial	Alveolar	Postalveolar	Velar	Glottal
Stop/Affricate	p [p]	t [t]	č [tʃ]	k [k]	
Fricative		s [s]			h [h]
Nasal	m [m]	n [n]			
Sonorant	w [w]	r [ɾ]	y [j]		

=== Vowels ===
Siebert reconstructs the following vowels for Powhatan (with assumed IPA equivalents in brackets):

	Front	Central	Back
Close	i· [iː], i [ɪ]		
Close-mid			o· [oː], o [ʊ]
Open-mid	e· [ɛː], e [ɛ]		
Open		a [ʌ~a]	a· [ɑː]

=== Stress ===
The Powhatan language uses syncope to determine the stressed syllable in words, more specifically the syncopation of weak vowels, /a/ and /e/. Syllable weight is determined based on whether or not the first syllable contains a weak vowel. If it does, then even-numbered syllables are heavy and odd-numbered syllables are light. For example, /nepass/, which means "sun", would be pronounced /ne|PASS/. If the word starts with a strong vowel, then it is the opposite, with the even-numbered syllables being light and the odd-numbered syllables being heavy. For example, /wiːngan/, which means "good", would be pronounced /WIːN|gan/.

There are two kinds of syncope: major and minor. Major syncopation happens in morphemes that are three or more syllables in the middle of the word. This especially happens in light syllables ending in /s/ or /h/. Some examples of this are in the words for "spoon" and "broom". The word for "spoon" would be pronounced /eː | MEH | koːn/, but with major syncopation, it is pronounced /eːm | KOːN/. The word for "broom" would be pronounced /ČIː | keh | KAHI | kan/, but with the syncopation, it becomes /ČIːK| kahi | KAN/. Note that the last example is a prime example of the light syllable that ends in /h/ being syncopated.

Minor syncopation tends to be optional and only seen in specific dialects. Syllable weight is not a factor and instead it depends on if the word begins with /m/ or /n/ or ends with an /s/ or a cluster including /s/ such as /sk/. An example of this is in the word for "five", which would be pronounced /pa | REːN | eskw / and is instead pronounced as /pa | REːN| esk/ or /pa|REːN| sk/.

=== Historical phonological changes ===
Based on his work to reconstruct Powhatan, Siebert was able to compare the changes that the language might have made compared to Proto-Algonquian and Proto-Eastern Algonquian. Here are three of the most basic changes his research pinpointed:

All syllabic phonemes are the same in between Proto-Eastern Algonquian and Powhatan and the only change between those two and Proto-Algonquian is that word-initial /ɛ/ became an /a/ in Powhatan and Proto-Eastern Algonquian.

- PA *ešpe·wi /ɛʃpeːwi/ "it is high" → aspe·w /aspeːw/.

Word-final vowels are deleted if they are preceded by a consonant between Proto-Algonquian and Powhatan.

- PA *mye·neθki /mjeːneθki/ "earthwork" → me·nesk /meːnesk/

Powhatan drops the difference between *s /s/ and *š /ʃ/ that is found in Proto-Algonquian. Similarly, PA /l/ becomes /r/ in Powhatan, unless it in a word-final position of a particle or inflectional morphemes, where it is deleted. Furthermore PA /θ/ becomes /t/.

- PA *ši·ši·pa /ʃiːˀ.ʃiː.pa/ "duck" → si·si·p /siːs.siːp/
- PA *le·kawi /leː.ka.wi/ "sand" → re·kaw /reːkaw/
- PA *aθemwehša /a.θem.weh.ʃa/ "little dog" → atemos /a.te.mos/

== Grammar ==
=== Nouns ===
In Powhatan, nouns take inflective affixes depending on their class. There seems affixes only added to third person nouns. These nouns are not only categorized as singular and plural, but also animate and inanimate. For the animate group there are the proximate and obviative classes; the proximate class is for nouns considered more salient, and the obviative class is for nouns considered less salient. This is quite common for Algonquian languages, and strongly reflects the traditional worldview of Powhatan groups, as well as other Algonquian-speaking groups.

	Animate		Inanimate
	Proximate	Obviative	Inanimate
Singular		-ah	
Plural	-ak	-ah	-as

=== Diminutives ===
Powhatan has six affixes for naming items diminutively. These affixes function by a rule of internal sandhi. The last ending in the list is the most commonly seen diminutive. The following are the affixes themselves:

- -ins ex: mehekoins "little stick"
- -ēns ex: piymenahkoānēns "small cord"
- -ēs or -īs ex: mahkatēs "small coal"
- -iss ex: metemsiss "old woman"
- -ēss ex: mossaskoēss "muskrat"
- -ess ex: ērikoess "ant"

=== Verbs ===
There are three types of verb affixes of the Powhatan language, all of which are inflective. Powhatan is a language that follows an agglutinative pattern. Although it might have lost some of its strict rules, there is a clear pattern where the indication of person is mainly consistent regardless of the type or class of verbs.

==== Animate intransitive independent verbs ====
The chart below presents the affixes taken by animate intransitive verbs. The first and second singular persons usually take the ne-/ ke- prefix, unless the verb ends with a long ā, in which case it takes a ne-m/ke-m circumfix. In the plural, first person has two forms, "we" inclusive and "we" exclusive.

Animate intransitive indicative
Person	Affix
1s	ne-/ne-m
2s	ke-/ke-m
3s	-w/-o
1p ("we" exclusive)	ne-men
1p ("we" inclusive)	ke-men
2p	ke-mow
3p	-wak

==== Transitive inanimate independent indicative verbs ====
The second group of verbs is for inanimate transitive verbs. These verbs only have singular subjects, but that does not prevent them from having a singular and plural form. These verbs also fall into three different classes of their own and well as two negative forms.

Person	Classes		
	1 EX. tāhtēh "To extinguish it"	2 EX. pēt "To bring it"	3 EX. nam "To see it"
1st singular	ne-amen netāhtēhamen "I extinguish it"	ne-ān nepētān "I bring"	ne-en nenamen "I see it"
2nd singular	ke-amen ketāhtēhamen "You extinguish it"	ke-ān kepētān "You bring"	ke-en kenamen "You see it"
3rd singular	o-amen otāhtēhamen "S/He/It extinguishes it"	-ow pētow "S/He/It brings"	o-men onammen "S/He/It sees it"
1st plural	-amena tāhtēhamena "We extinguish it"	-āna pētāna "We bring"	-ena namena "We see it"
2nd plural	-amena tāhtēhamena "You all extinguish it"	-āna pētāna "You all bring"	-ena namena "You all see it"
3rd plural	-amena tāhtēhamena "They extinguish it"	–	-ena namena "They see it"

Transitive inanimate negatives
Person	Class 1	Class 3
1st	ne-amowen	ne-owen
2nd	ke-amowmen	ke-owen
3rd	o-amowen	o-owen

==== Transitive animate verbs ====
This class of verb is used to express actions done to other people and things. Notice the hierarchy that occurs, especially in the first singular form with a second singular object. When referring to an I–to–you relationship, like kowamānes "I love you", a variant of the second person prefix, ko-, is used instead of the first person ne- prefix even though "I" is the subject.

Person relationship	Affix
1st sing. – 3rd sing	ne-āw nemerāmāw "I smell him"
2nd sing – 3rd sing	ke-āw kemownasāw "You cut his hair"
1st sing – 2nd sing	ko-es kowamānes "I love you"
Negative 1st sing – 2nd sing	ke-erow

=== Syntax ===
Possibly due to the fact that Siebert's research was more focused on reconstructing Powhatan for the purpose of comparing it to Proto-Algonquian or because the notes of Smith and Strachey do not lend themselves to analyzing it, syntax is not discussed in Siebert's research nor are there any examples of what sentences might have been like. However, by looking at other languages in the same family as Powhatan, some basic patterns can be established:

It has been established that Powhatan is considered an agglutinative language, meaning that morphemes can be added on to words to communicate more descriptive meanings. This happens especially in verbs, allowing one long word to basically represent a whole sentence. This almost eliminates the importance of word order.

Other languages in the Algonquian family are marked with obviative/proximate endings, which clarify the subjects of focus, especially in telling stories.

There is not enough data recorded to put together a definite list of the imperatives, but Strachey documents imperatives being used. Therefore, using those lists and what is known about Proto-Eastern Algonquian, a tentative list can be created. Some examples of these imperatives are as follows: pasekoiys "arise you!"; piāk "come you all!"; ontenass "you take it away from there!"; miytiys "you eat it!"; miytiyk "you all eat it!";

Imperatives
Person	Animate	Transitive class 1	Transitive class 3
2nd Singular	-s	-ass	-s
2nd Plural	-ek	*-amok (Note: presumed ending)	-ek

Finally, as explained in the transitive animate verbs section, there are circumstances of animacy hierarchy with direct objects in Powhatan. Instead of the hierarchy going first person, second person, third person, there is a pattern of second person, first person, third person. For example, to say "I strike him" would be nepakamāw, where the ne- prefix for first person is first and the -āw for third person is at the end. However, to say something like "I feed you", it would be keassakmes with the ke- prefix for second person at the beginning and a different -es suffix for first person at the end. This might be a result of a practice of respect for others before oneself. "It is one of the few languages that give greater importance to the listener than the speaker," Dr. Blair Rudes, the linguist who worked on reconstructing the language for the movie The New World, remarked in an interview.

== See also ==
- Carolina Algonquian
- List of English words of Algonquian origin
- Nansemond language
- Nanticoke language
- Pamunkey language
- Piscataway language
