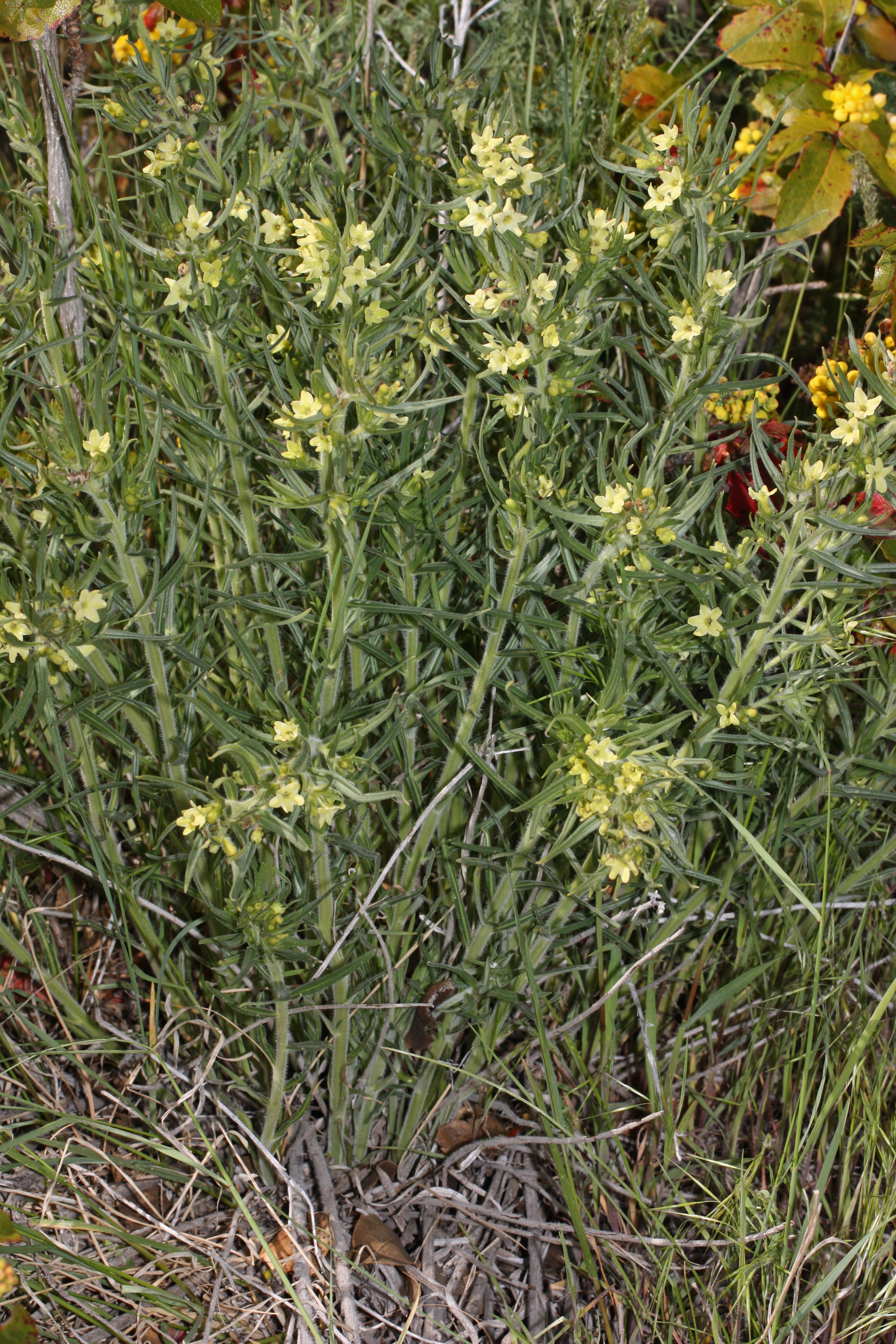
- Lithospermum ruderale in Wenas Wildlife Area, Washington

Conservation status
- Secure (NatureServe)

Scientific classification
- Kingdom: Plantae
- Clade: Embryophytes
- Clade: Tracheophytes
- Clade: Spermatophytes
- Clade: Angiosperms
- Clade: Eudicots
- Clade: Asterids
- Order: Boraginales
- Family: Boraginaceae
- Genus: Lithospermum
- Species: L. ruderale

Binomial name
- Lithospermum ruderale Douglas ex Lehm.

Synonyms
- Batschia pilosa G.Don; Batschia torreyi G.Don; Lithospermum lanceolatum Rydb.; Lithospermum pilosum Nutt.; Lithospermum ruderale var. lanceolatum A.Nelson; Lithospermum ruderale var. macrospermum J.F.Macbr.; Lithospermum ruderale var. torreyi J.F.Macbr.; Lithospermum torreyi Nutt.

= Lithospermum ruderale =

Species of flowering plant in the borage family

Lithospermum ruderale is a species of flowering plant in the borage family. It is known by the common names wayside gromwell, puccoon, western stoneseed and lemonweed.

== Description ==
A perennial herb growing from a taproot and woody caudex, it is covered with fine, more or less upright, hairs, especially on the stems. It produces a cluster of erect leafy stems ranging from 20 to 60 centimetres (8 to 23 1/2 in) in height. The stems support lance-shaped leaves ranging from 2.5–10 cm (1–4 in) in length.

From April to June, bunches of flowers with leaf-like bracts appear toward the top of the stem amongst the leaves. The corolla is fused at the base with five lobes which are light yellow, often slightly greenish, and about 1 cm long and wide. The throat of the flower is glandular with no protrusions. The style is short. The fruit consists of one or two, sometimes four, clustered glossy grey nutlets, up to 6 millimetres (1/4 in) long.

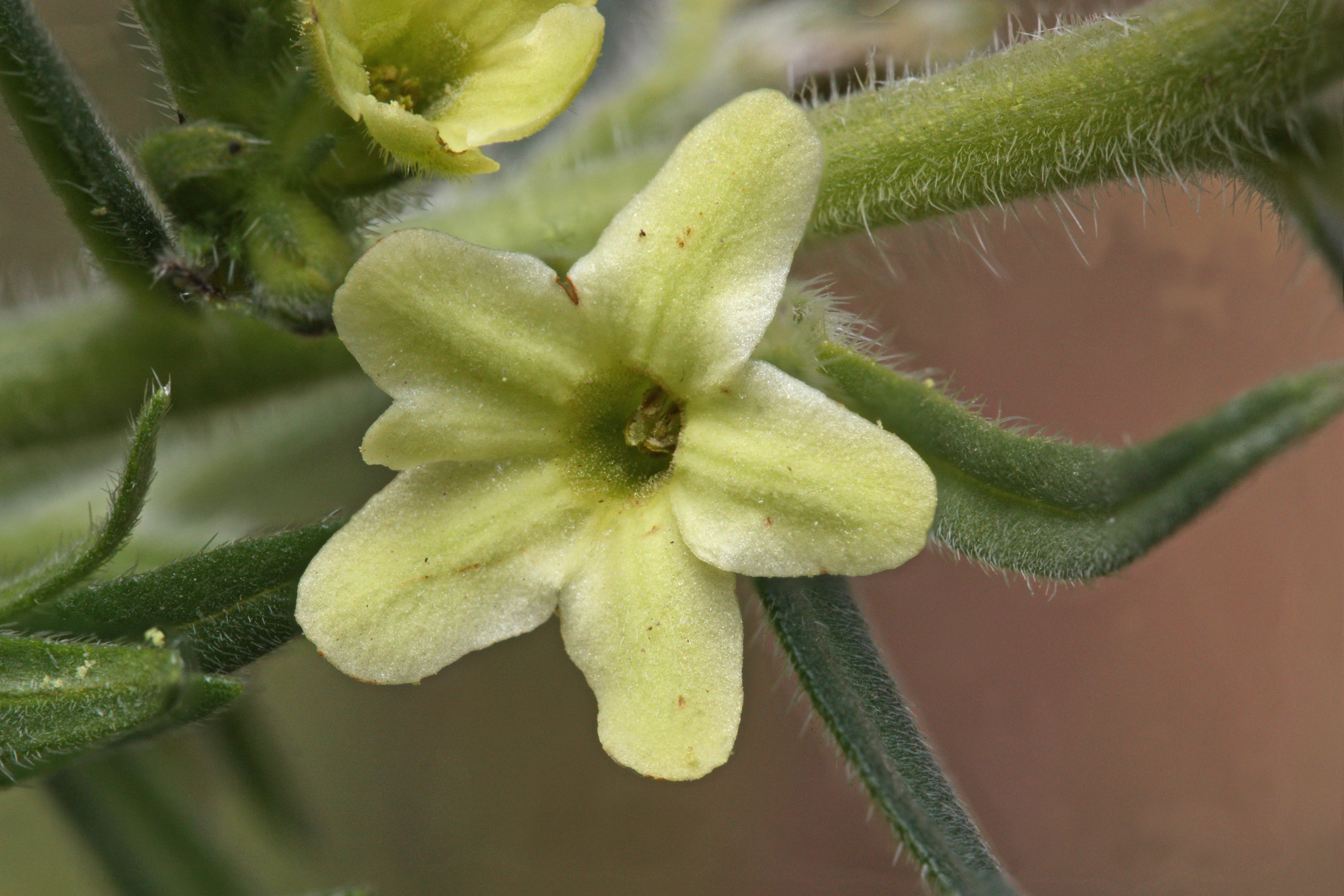
Flower close-up

== Distribution and habitat ==
The species is native to western Canada and the western United States, where it can be found in open areas near sagebrush, juniper and pine.

== Uses ==
The plant was used as a contraceptive by several Native American groups, including the Navajo and Shoshone. Studies on mice show the plant reduced their fertility. Plains Indians also used the roots to treat respiratory issues and cooked them as food.
