= Eastern Abenaki language =

Extinct Algonquian language

Eastern Abenaki
- Alnombak, Alnôbak, Eastern Abnaki, Wawenock
- Alənαpαtəwéwαkan
- Native to: United States
- Region: Maine, New Hampshire
- Ethnicity: 1,800 Abenaki and Penobscot (1982)
- Extinct: 1993, with the death of Madeline Shay
- Language family: Algic: Algonquian; Eastern Algonquian; Abenaki; Eastern Abenaki
- Writing system: Latin script

Official status
- Official language in: Wabanaki Confederacy

Language codes
- ISO 639-3: aaq
- Glottolog: east2544
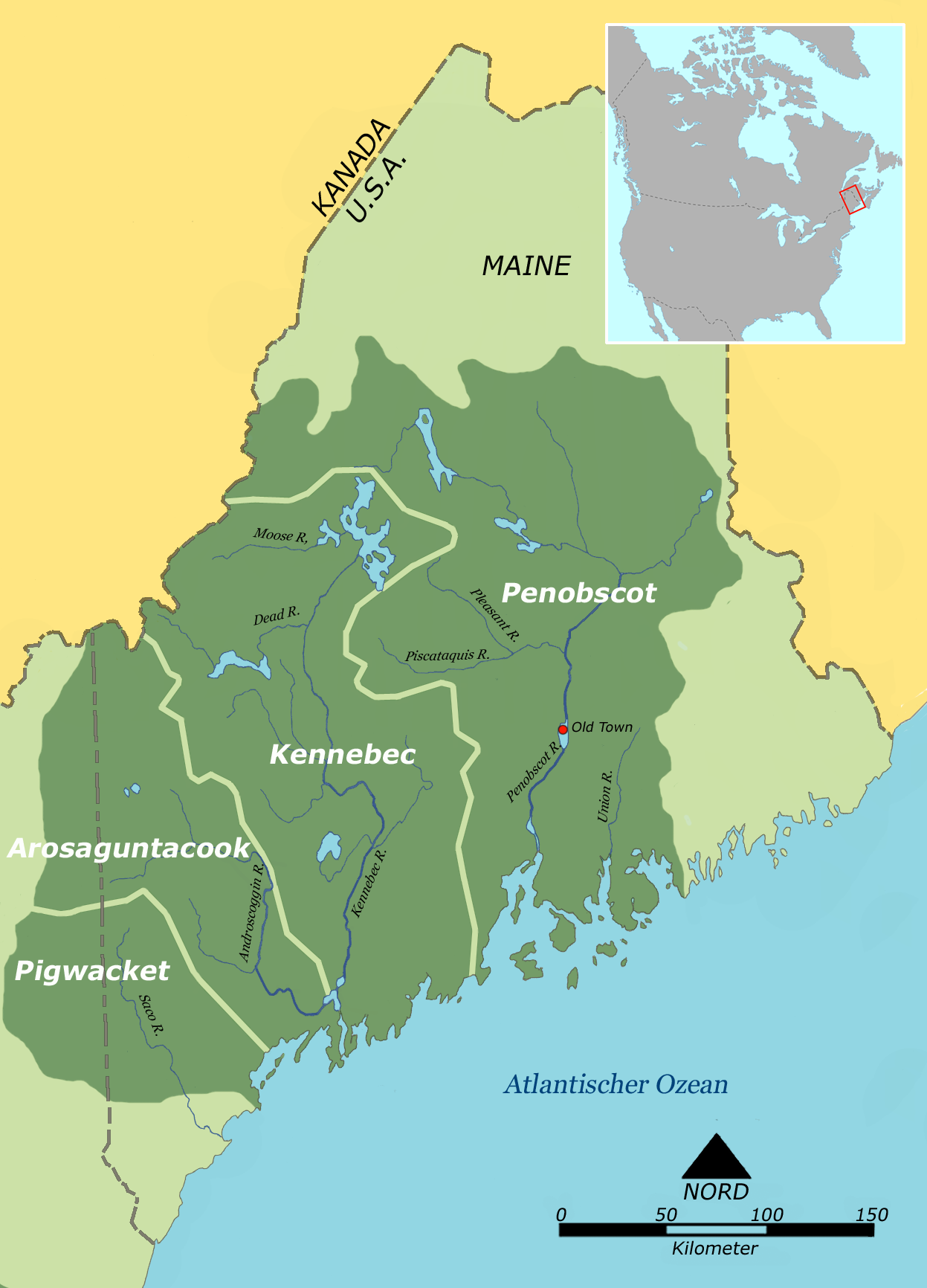
- Eastern Abenaki

- Eastern Abenaki is classified as Extinct by the UNESCO Atlas of the World's Languages in Danger.

Eastern Abenaki is an extinct Algonquian language formerly spoken by the Abenaki people. They were spoken by several peoples, including the Penobscot of what is now Maine. Other speakers of Eastern Abenaki included tribes such as the Amoscocongon who spoke the Arosagunticook dialect, and the Caniba, which are documented in French-language materials from the colonial period. The last known natively fluent speaker of Penobscot Abenaki, Madeline Shay, died in 1993. However, several Penobscot elders still speak Penobscot, and there is an ongoing effort to preserve it and teach it in the local schools; much of the language was preserved by Frank Siebert. About 500 Penobscot words are still being used in the community in everyday language such as Muhmum for 'grandpa' and nolke for 'deer'.

In July 2013, the Penobscot Nation, the University of Maine and the American Philosophical Society received a grant from the National Endowment for the Humanities to expand and publish the first Penobscot Dictionary.
