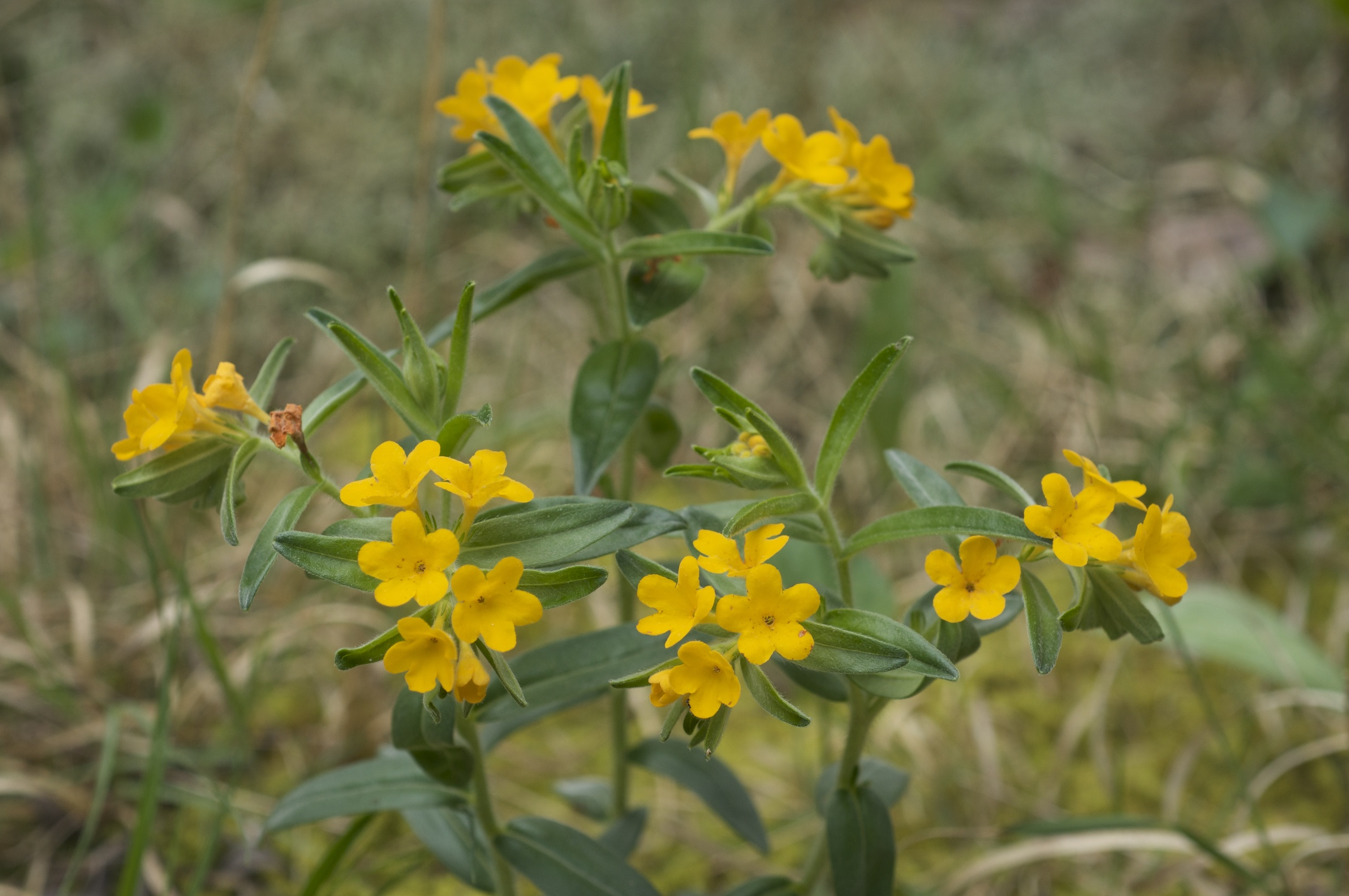

Conservation status
- Secure (NatureServe)

Scientific classification
- Kingdom: Plantae
- Clade: Tracheophytes
- Clade: Angiosperms
- Clade: Eudicots
- Clade: Asterids
- Order: Boraginales
- Family: Boraginaceae
- Genus: Lithospermum
- Species: L. canescens

Binomial name
- Lithospermum canescens (Michx.) Lehm.

Synonyms
- Batschia canescens Michx.

= Lithospermum canescens =

Species of flowering plant in the borage family

Lithospermum canescens, or the hoary puccoon is a perennial herb endemic to eastern North America. The plant grows in a variety of habitats. It has golden yellow flowers which bloom from April to May.

== Description ==
Lithospermum canescens grows to 6–16 in (150–410 mm) in height, growing from a thick, red, woody taproot with one to several stems that are usually not branched. Its leaves are alternate and oblong, and lack a petiole. The leaves range around 1–2 in (25–51 mm) in length and have any width under 0.5 in (13 mm). Both the leaves and stems are grey-green and pubescent, meaning they are covering with many short, silky, erect trichomes, or hairs.

Its flowers are tubular and cluster at the terminal racemes, or at the end of stems. They are commonly yellow to orange in hue and are about 0.5 in (13 mm) in diameter. The fruit of the plant is a hard, smooth, yellowish-white seedlike nutlet.

== Taxonomy ==
The genus name lithospermum comes from the Greek lethos, meaning "stone", and sperma, meaning "seed", referencing the stone-like seeds of the plant. The species name canescens means "white with age", referencing the short, white hairs that cover the plant.

The common name "hoary puccoon" also references the short, white trichomes on the plant, as hoary also means "white or grey with age, and the word "puccoon" comes from a Native American word meaning "a plant that yields a pigment".

== Distribution and habitat ==
The plant commonly grows in dry to moderately moist soils, in prairies, woodlands, and the edges of roads. It seldom grows in sandy soils.

In the United States, it is native from Nebraska to the west, Texas to the south, New York to the east, and the Canadian border to the north. In Canada, it is native in Saskatchewan, Manitoba, and Ontario.

== Uses ==
Native American children chew the plant with their gum to dye it red, as referenced in the common name "hoary puccoon". The taproot produces the reddish-purple juice that is commonly used as a pigment. Native Americans also use the roots of the plant to treat asthma or any lung complaints, and as a sedative. The Menomini peoples used the ripened, white seed of the plant as a type of ceremonial bead.
