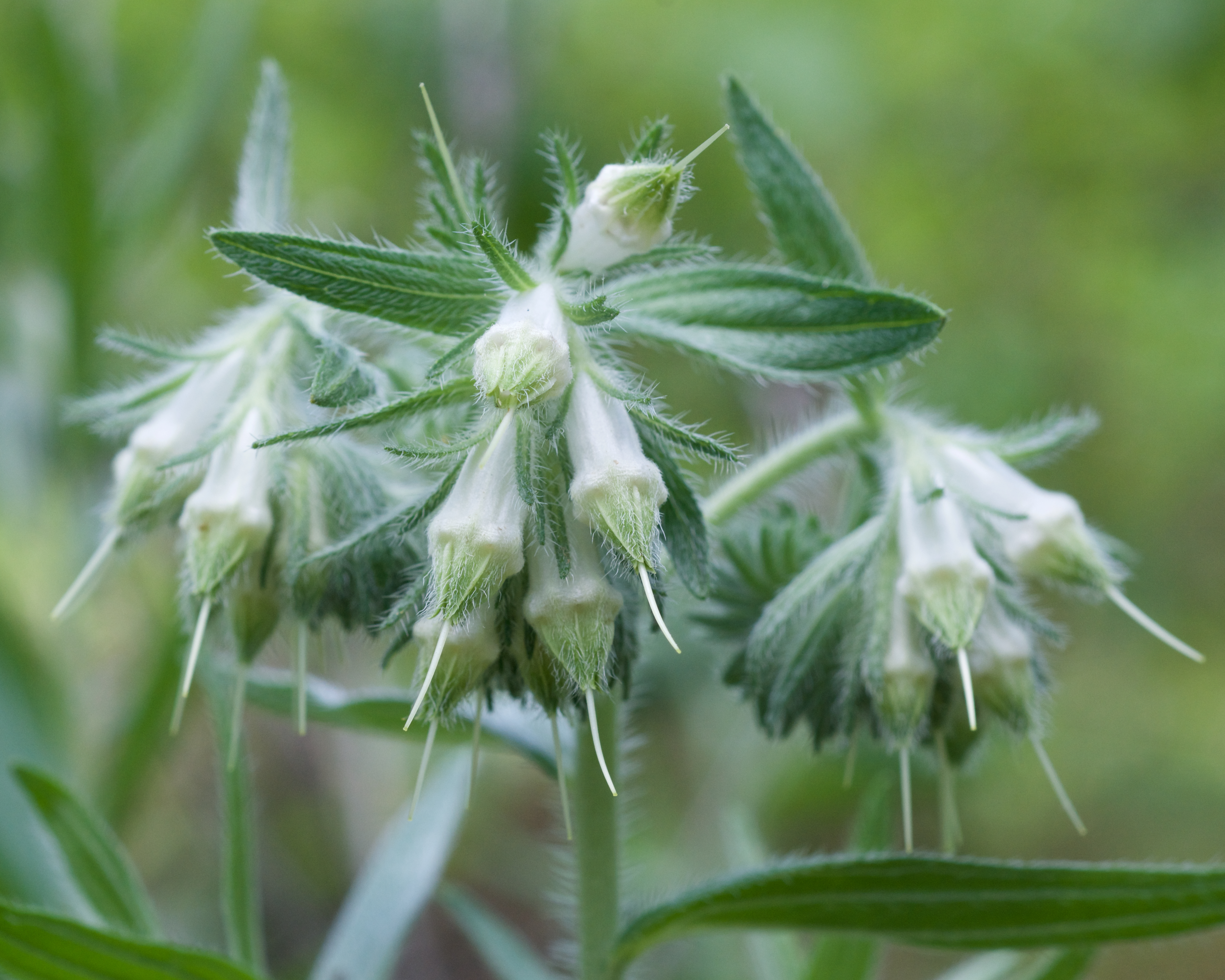

Conservation status
- Vulnerable (NatureServe)

Scientific classification
- Kingdom: Plantae
- Clade: Embryophytes
- Clade: Tracheophytes
- Clade: Spermatophytes
- Clade: Angiosperms
- Clade: Eudicots
- Clade: Asterids
- Order: Boraginales
- Family: Boraginaceae
- Genus: Lithospermum
- Species: L. bejariense

Binomial name
- Lithospermum bejariense A.DC.

= Lithospermum bejariense =

Species of flowering plant in the borage family

Lithospermum bejariense, known by the common name western marbleseed, is a species of flowering plant in the borage family. It is native to the Southeastern United States, where it is in found rocky barrens and glades in calcareous areas. It is distinguished from other closely related Lithospermum by its flowers that are 1–2 cm long and its spreading 2–4 cm stem pubescence.
