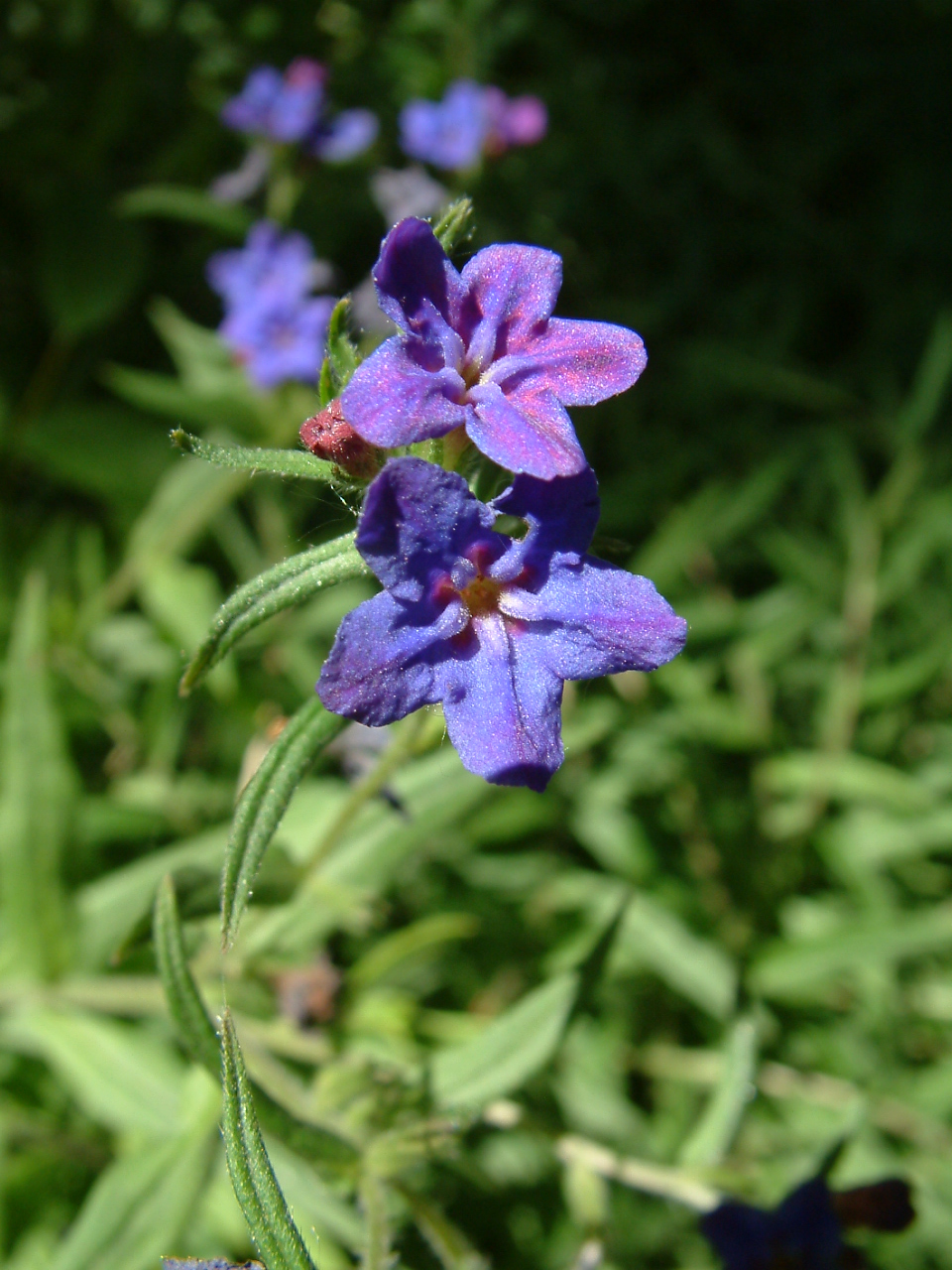
- Lithospermum purpurocaeruleum

Scientific classification
- Kingdom: Plantae
- Clade: Embryophytes
- Clade: Tracheophytes
- Clade: Spermatophytes
- Clade: Angiosperms
- Clade: Eudicots
- Clade: Asterids
- Order: Boraginales
- Family: Boraginaceae
- Subfamily: Boraginoideae
- Genus: Lithospermum; L. (1753)

Type species
- Lithospermum officinale L.

Species
- 84; see text

Synonyms
- Batschia J.F.Gmel. (1791); Cyphorima Raf. (1819); Lasiarrhenum I.M.Johnst. (1924); Macromeria D.Don (1832); Nomosa I.M.Johnst. (1954); Onosmodium Michx. (1803); Osmodium Raf. (1808); Pentalophus DC. (1846); Perittostema I.M.Johnst. (1954); Psilolaemus I.M.Johnst. (1954); Purshia Spreng. (1817), nom. illeg.

= Lithospermum =

Genus of flowering plants in the borage family

Lithospermum is a genus of plants belonging to the family Boraginaceae. The genus is distributed nearly worldwide, but most are native to the Americas and the center of diversity is in the southwestern United States and Mexico. Species are known generally as gromwells or stoneseeds.

== Taxonomy ==
Plants of the World Online currently accepts 84 species. Other sources accept about 50 to 60 species in the genus. A 2009 molecular study showed that the genus Onosmodium is included within Lithospermum.

== Species ==
84 species are accepted.

- Lithospermum affine DC.
- Lithospermum afromontanum Weim.
- Lithospermum album (G.L.Nesom) J.I.Cohen
- Lithospermum altamiranense Pat.-Sicil., Cohen & Pérez-Calix
- Lithospermum astienzae Pat.-Sicil., Cohen & Pérez-Calix
- Lithospermum azuayense Weigend & Nürk
- Lithospermum barbigerum (I.M.Johnst.) J.I.Cohen
- Lithospermum berlandieri I.M.Johnst.
- Lithospermum bolivariense Weigend & Nürk
- Lithospermum calcicola B.L.Rob.
- Lithospermum californicum A.Gray – California stoneseed
- Lithospermum calycosum (J.F.Macbr.) I.M.Johnst. – Chinati stoneseed or roundleaf stoneseed
- Lithospermum canescens (Michx.) Lehm. – hoary puccoon, Indian-paint
- Lithospermum caroliniense (J.F.Gmel.) MacMill. – Carolina gromwell, hairy puccoon
  - Lithospermum caroliniense var. caroliniense (synonym Lithospermum bejariense DC.) – western marbleseed
  - Lithospermum caroliniense var. croceum (Fernald) Cronquist
- Lithospermum chiapense J.I.Cohen
- Lithospermum chihuahuanum J.I.Cohen
- Lithospermum cinerascens (A.DC.) I.M.Johnst.
- Lithospermum cinereum DC.
- Lithospermum cobrense Greene – smooththroat stoneseed
- Lithospermum confine I.M.Johnst. – Arizona stoneseed
- Lithospermum confundum (B.L.Turner) J.I.Cohen
- Lithospermum cuneifolium Pers.
- Lithospermum cuzcoense Weigend & Nürk
- Lithospermum decipiens (J.R.Allison) Weakley
- Lithospermum discolor M.Martens & Galeotti
- Lithospermum distichum Ortega
- Lithospermum diversifolium DC.
- Lithospermum dodrantale (I.M.Johnst.) J.I.Cohen
- Lithospermum elenae Pat.-Sicil., J.I.Cohen & Zamudio
- Lithospermum erythrorhizon Siebold & Zucc. – purple gromwell, red-root gromwell, 紫草 zicao (Pinyin: zǐcǎo), 紫草 murasaki-sō (Japanese)
- Lithospermum exsertum (D.Don) J.I.Cohen
- Lithospermum flavum Sessé & Moc.
- Lithospermum flexuosum Lehm.
- Lithospermum gayanum (Wedd.) I.M.Johnst.
- Lithospermum guatemalense Donn.Sm.
- Lithospermum hancockianum Oliv.
- Lithospermum helleri (Small) J.I.Cohen
- Lithospermum hirsutum E.Mey. ex DC.
- Lithospermum incisum Lehm. – narrowleaf stoneseed, fringed gromwell
- Lithospermum indecorum I.M.Johnst.
- Lithospermum ireneae Pat.-Sicil., J.I.Cohen & Zamudio
- Lithospermum jimulcense I.M.Johnst.
- Lithospermum johnstonii J.I.Cohen
- Lithospermum kelloggianum J.I.Cohen
- Lithospermum latifolium Michx. – American stoneseed
- Lithospermum leonotis (I.M.Johnst.) J.I.Cohen
- Lithospermum leymebambense Weigend & Nürk
- Lithospermum macbridei I.M.Johnst.
- Lithospermum matamorense DC. – rough stoneseed
- Lithospermum mediale I.M.Johnst.
- Lithospermum mirabile Small – San Antonio stoneseed or Parks' stoneseed
- Lithospermum molle Michx.) Muhl. – softhair marbleseed
- Lithospermum muelleri I.M.Johnst.
- Lithospermum multiflorum Torr. ex A.Gray – manyflowered stoneseed
- Lithospermum nelsonii Greenm.
- Lithospermum notatum (I.M.Johnst.) J.I.Cohen
- Lithospermum oaxacanum (B.L.Turner) J.I.Cohen
- Lithospermum oblongifolium Greenm.
- Lithospermum obovatum J.F.Macbr.
- Lithospermum occidentale (Mack.) Weakley
- Lithospermum officinale L. – common gromwell, European stoneseed
- Lithospermum papillosum Thunb.
- Lithospermum parviflorum Weakley, Witsell & D.Estes – eastern prairie marbleseed
- Lithospermum peruvianum DC.
- Lithospermum pinetorum (I.M.Johnst.) J.I.Cohen
- Lithospermum pringlei I.M.Johnst.
- Lithospermum revolutum B.L.Rob.
- Lithospermum rodriguezii Weigend & Nürk
- Lithospermum rosei (I.M.Johnst.) J.I.Cohen
- Lithospermum ruderale Douglas ex Lehm. – western stoneseed, Columbia puccoon, wayside gromwell, whiteweed
- Lithospermum rzedowskii J.I.Cohen
- Lithospermum scabrum Thunb.
- Lithospermum strictum Lehm.
- Lithospermum subsetosum (Mack. & Bush) Weakley
- Lithospermum sylvestre J.I.Cohen & J.C.Manning
- Lithospermum tenerum J.I.Cohen
- Lithospermum thurberi (A.Gray) J.I.Cohen
- Lithospermum trinervium (Lehm.) J.I.Cohen
- Lithospermum tuberosum Rugel ex DC. – southern stoneseed, tuberous gromwell
- Lithospermum tubuliflorum Greene
- Lithospermum turneri J.I.Cohen
- Lithospermum unicum (J.F.Macbr.) J.I.Cohen
- Lithospermum virginianum L.
- Lithospermum viride Greene – green stoneseed

=== Formerly placed here ===
- Aegonychon purpurocaeruleum (L.) Holub (as Lithospermum purpurocaeruleum L.) – purple gromwell
- Buglossoides arvensis (L.) I.M.Johnst. (as Lithospermum arvense L.) – field gromwell, corn gromwell

== Ecology ==
Lithospermum leaves are eaten by the caterpillars of certain Lepidoptera, such as the moth Ethmia pusiella which has been recorded on L. officinale.

== Uses ==
The dried root of Lithospermum erythrorhizon is a Chinese herbal medicine with various antiviral and biological activities, including inhibition of human immunodeficiency virus type 1 (HIV-1). Lithospermum erythrorhizon is native to Japan, where it has been traditionally used to make a purple dye. In southwestern North America, a species of this genus was used as a contraceptive by the Shoshone Native American tribe.

== Fossil record ==
Seven petrified nutlets and nutlet fragments of a Lithospermum species have been described from the Late Miocene Ash Hollow Formation, Ogallala Group, five km south of Martin in Bennett County, South Dakota. †Lithospermum dakotense sp. nov. shows similarities in size, shape, attachment and epidermal cell patterns to extant Lithospermum species. The fossil nutlets were preserved in various stages of maturity. The fossils closely resemble the nutlets of Lithospermum caroliniense and Lithospermum incisum.
