= Amotape District =

Coordinates: 4.8815°S 81.0150°W

Amotape
- District
- Interactive map of Amotape
- Country: Peru
- Region: Piura
- Province: Paita
- Founded: October 8, 1840
- Capital: Amotape

Government
  - Mayor: Melania Rojas Garcia

Area
  - Total: 90.82 km^{2} (35.07 sq mi)
- Elevation: 12 m (39 ft)

Population (2017)
  - Total: 2,413
  - Density: 26.57/km^{2} (68.81/sq mi)
- Time zone: UTC-5 (PET)
- UBIGEO: 200502

Amotape District is one of seven districts of the province Paita in Peru.
