= Native American cultures in the United States =

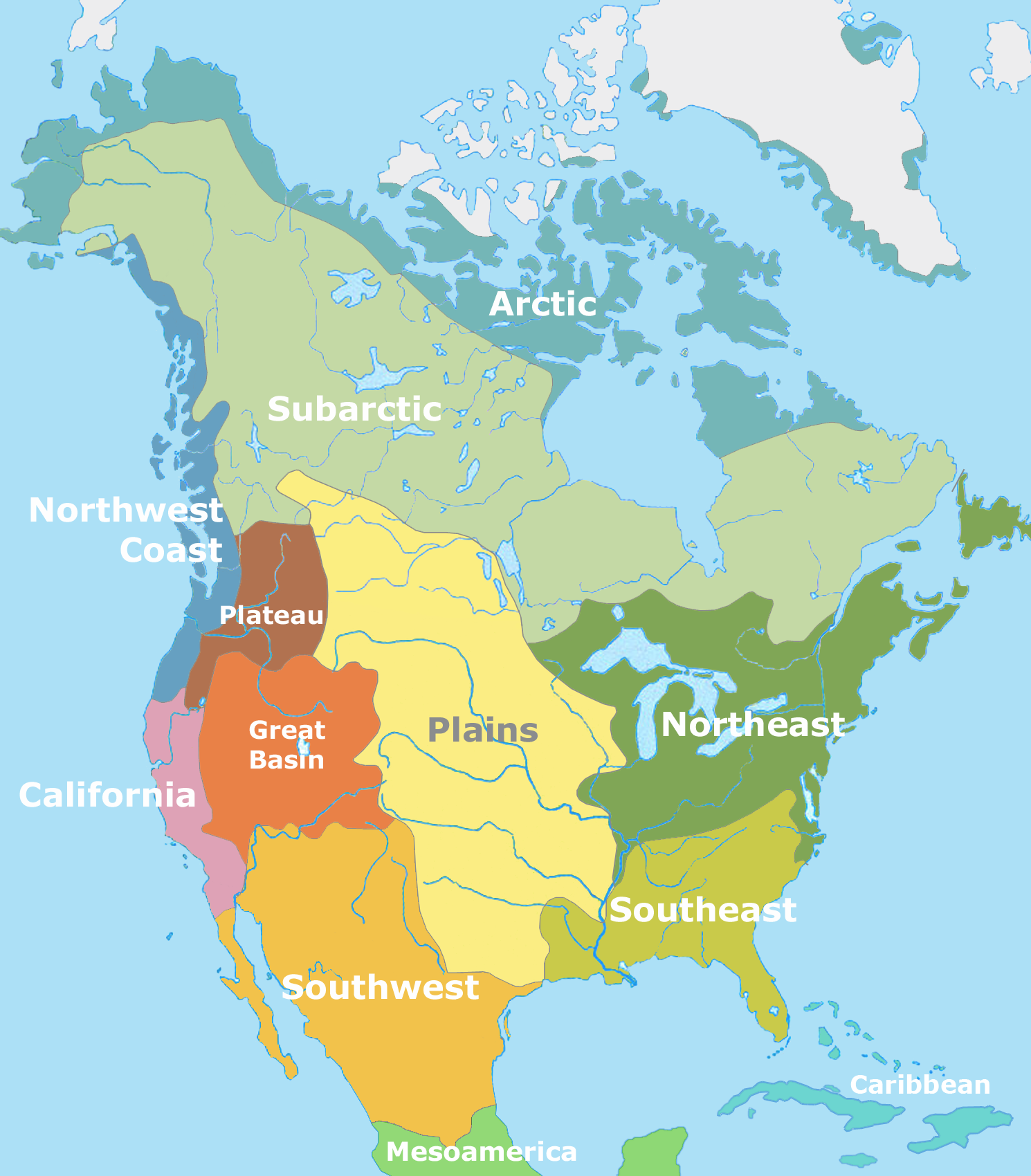
North American ethnic regions

Native American cultures across the 578 current federally recognized tribes in the United States can vary considerably by language, beliefs, customs, practices, laws, art forms, traditional clothing, and other facets of culture. Yet along with this diversity, there are certain elements which are encountered frequently and shared by many tribal nations.

European colonization of the Americas had a major impact on Native American cultures through what is known as the Columbian exchange. Also known as the Columbian interchange, this was the spread transfer of plants, animals, culture, human populations, technology, and ideas between the Americas and the Old World in the 15th and 16th centuries, following Christopher Columbus's 1492 voyage. The Columbian exchange generally had a destructive impact on Native American cultures through disease, and a 'clash of cultures', whereby European values of private property, smaller family structures, and labor led to conflict, appropriation of traditional communal lands and slavery.

== Cultural areas ==
Academics tend to group the cultures of Indigenous North America by geographical region where shared cultural traits occur, based on how these cultures have continued since the Pre-Columbian era. The northwest culture area, for example, shared common traits such as salmon fishing, woodworking, large villages or towns, and a hierarchical social structure.

Native Americans in the United States fall into several distinct ethnolinguistic and territorial phyla, with diverse governmental and economic systems.

They can be classified as belonging to several large cultural areas:

- Contiguous United States
  - Californian tribes (Northern): Yok-Utian, Pacific Coast Athabaskan, Coast Miwok, Yurok, Palaihnihan, Chumashan, Uto-Aztecan
  - Plateau tribes: Interior Salish, Plateau Penutian
  - Great Basin tribes: Uto-Aztecan
  - Pacific Northwest Coast tribes: Pacific Coast Athabaskan, Coast Salish, Wakashan
  - Southwestern tribes (Oasisamerica): Uto-Aztecan, Yuman, Southern Athabaskan
  - Aridoamerica, Yuman–Cochimí, Tepiman
  - Plains Indians: Siouan, Plains Algonquian, Southern Athabaskan
  - Northeastern Woodlands tribes: Lenape, Pequot, Mohican, Mohawk, Iroquoian, Central Algonquian, Eastern Algonquian
  - Southeastern Woodlands tribes: Muskogean, Caddoan, Catawban, Iroquoian
- Alaska Natives
  - Arctic: Eskimo–Aleut
  - Subarctic: Northern Athabaskan
- Native Hawaiians

These cultural regions are not universally agreed upon. Some systems combine the Great Basin and Plateau into Indigenous peoples of Intermountain West. Others separate Northern Plains from Southern Plains and Great Lakes tribes from Northeastern Woodlands tribes. Some identify Prairie tribes as distinct from Northeastern Woodlands tribes and Plains tribes.

== Language ==
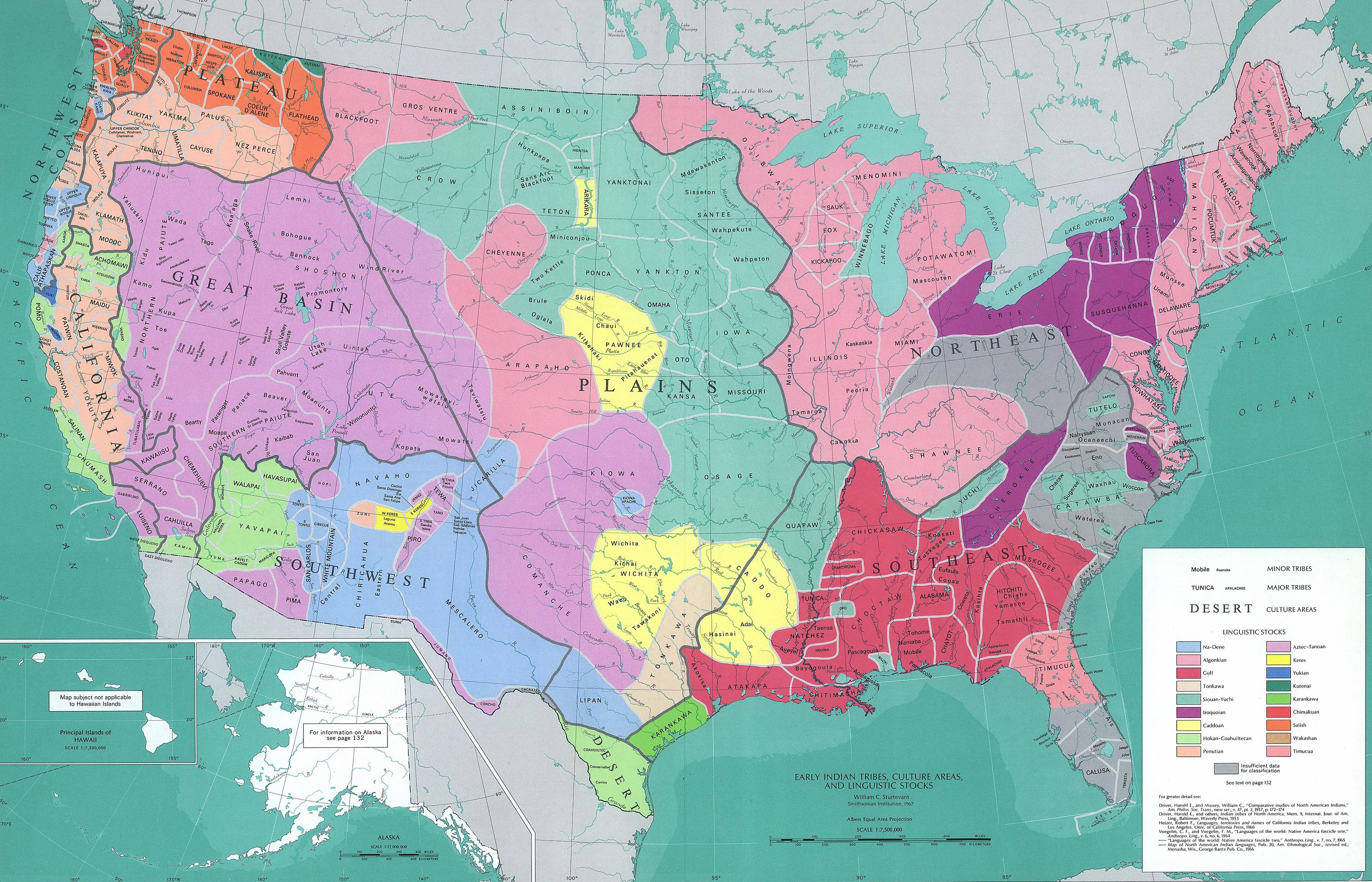
Early indigenous languages in the U.S.

There are approximately 296 spoken (or formerly spoken) indigenous languages north of Mexico, 269 of which are grouped into 29 families.

The major ethno-linguistic phyla are:

- Na-Dene languages,
- Iroquoian languages,
- Caddoan languages
- Algonquian languages
- Algic languages,
- Siouan–Catawban languages,
- Uto-Aztecan languages,
- Salishan languages,
- Tanoan languages
- Eskimo–Aleut (Alaska)

The Na-Dené, Algic, and Uto-Aztecan families are the largest in terms of number of languages. Uto-Aztecan has the most speakers (1.95 million) if the languages in Mexico are considered (mostly due to 1.5 million speakers of Nahuatl); Na-Dené comes in second with approximately 200,000 speakers (nearly 180,000 of these are speakers of Navajo), and Algic in third with about 180,000 speakers (mainly Cree and Ojibwe). Na-Dené and Algic have the widest geographic distributions: Algic currently spans from northeastern Canada across much of the continent down to northeastern Mexico (due to later migrations of the Kickapoo) with two outliers in California (Yurok and Wiyot). The remaining 27 languages are either isolates or unclassified), such as Penutian languages, Hokan, Gulf languages and others.

== Organization ==
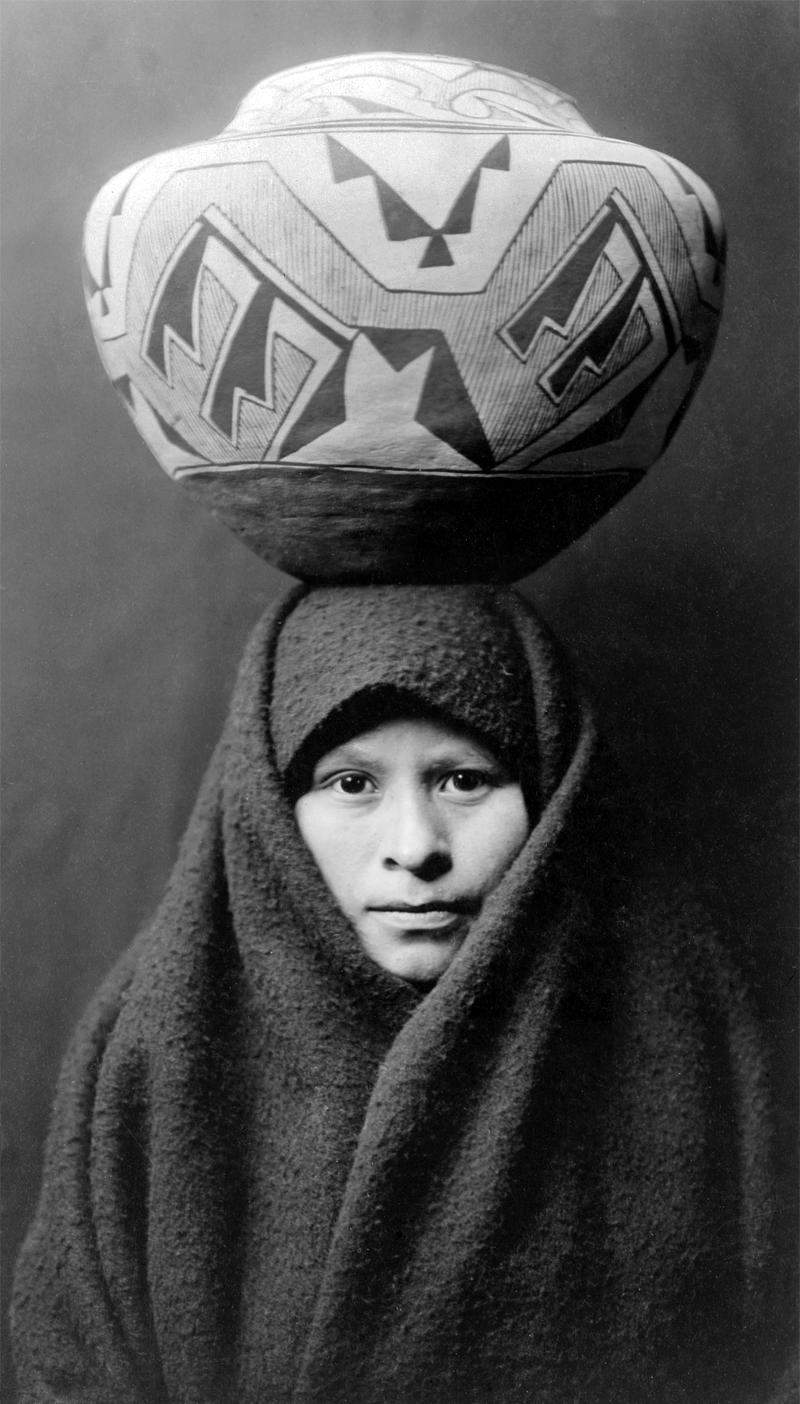
Zuni girl with pottery jar on her head in 1903

=== Gens structure ===
Early European American scholar described the Native Americans (as well as any other tribal society) as having a society dominated by clans or gentes (in the Roman model) before tribes were formed. There were some common characteristics:

- The right to elect its sachem and chiefs.
- The right to depose its sachem and chiefs.
- The obligation not to marry in the gens.
- Mutual rights of inheritance of the property of deceased members.
- Reciprocal obligations of help, defense, and redress of injuries.
- The right to bestow names on its members.
- The right to adopt strangers into the gens.
- Common religious rights, query.
- A common burial place.
- A council of the gens.

=== Tribal structures ===
Early European American scholars described the Native Americans as having a society dominated by clans.

Tribes, Nations, bands and clans may define and organize themselves in a variety of ways. Federally recognized tribes in the United States are communities of Indigenous people that have been in continual existence since prior to European contact, and which have a sovereign, government-to-government relationship with the Federal government of the United States. In the United States, the Native American tribe is a fundamental unit of sovereign tribal government, with the federally-recognized right to self-government and, tribal sovereignty and self-determination. These tribes possess the right to establish the legal requirements for membership. They may form their own government, enforce laws (both civil and criminal), tax, license and regulate activities, zone, and exclude people from tribal territories. Limitations on tribal powers of self-government include the same limitations applicable to states; for example, neither tribes nor states have the power to make war, engage in foreign relations, or coin money.

== Traditional diets ==
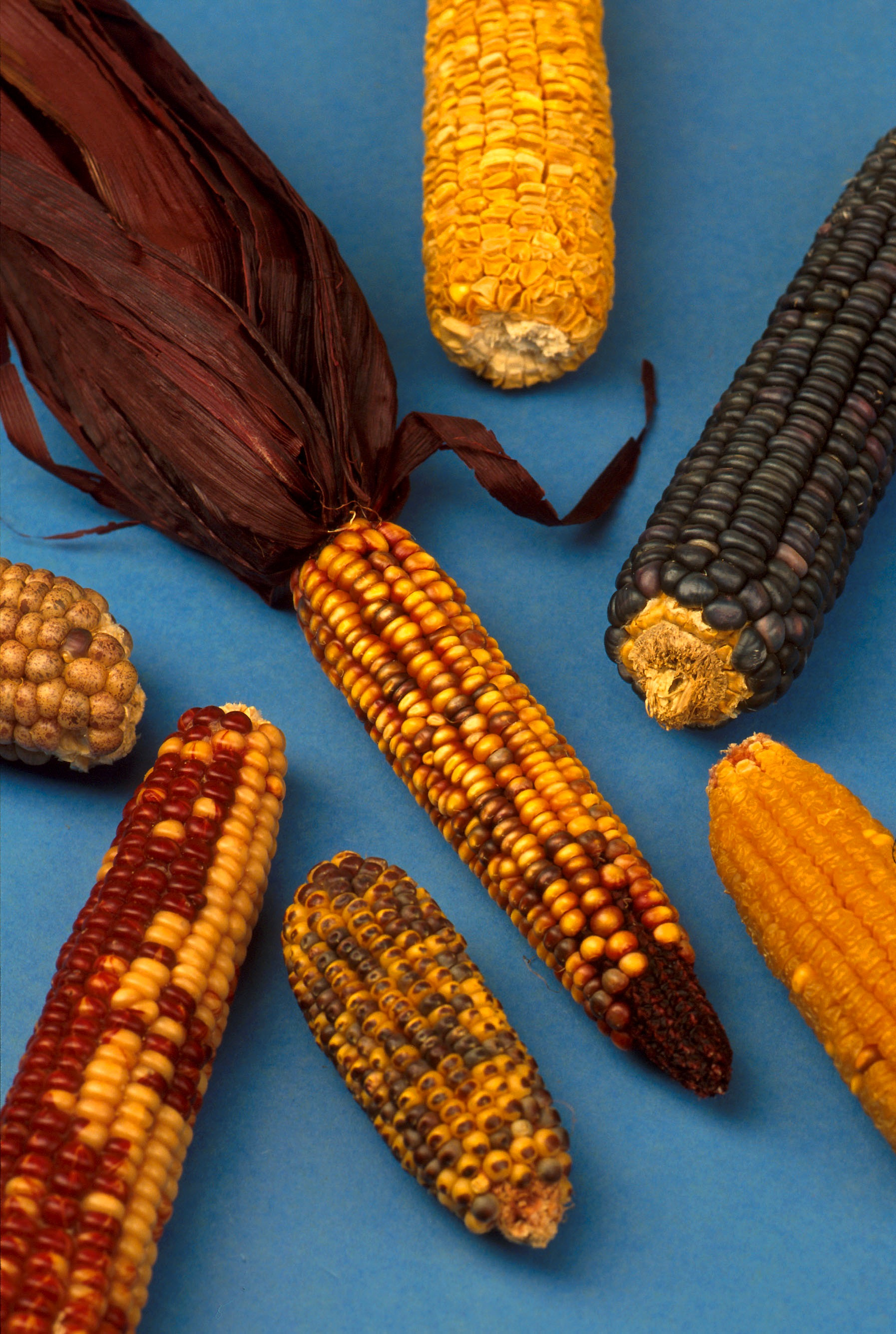
Maize grown by Native Americans

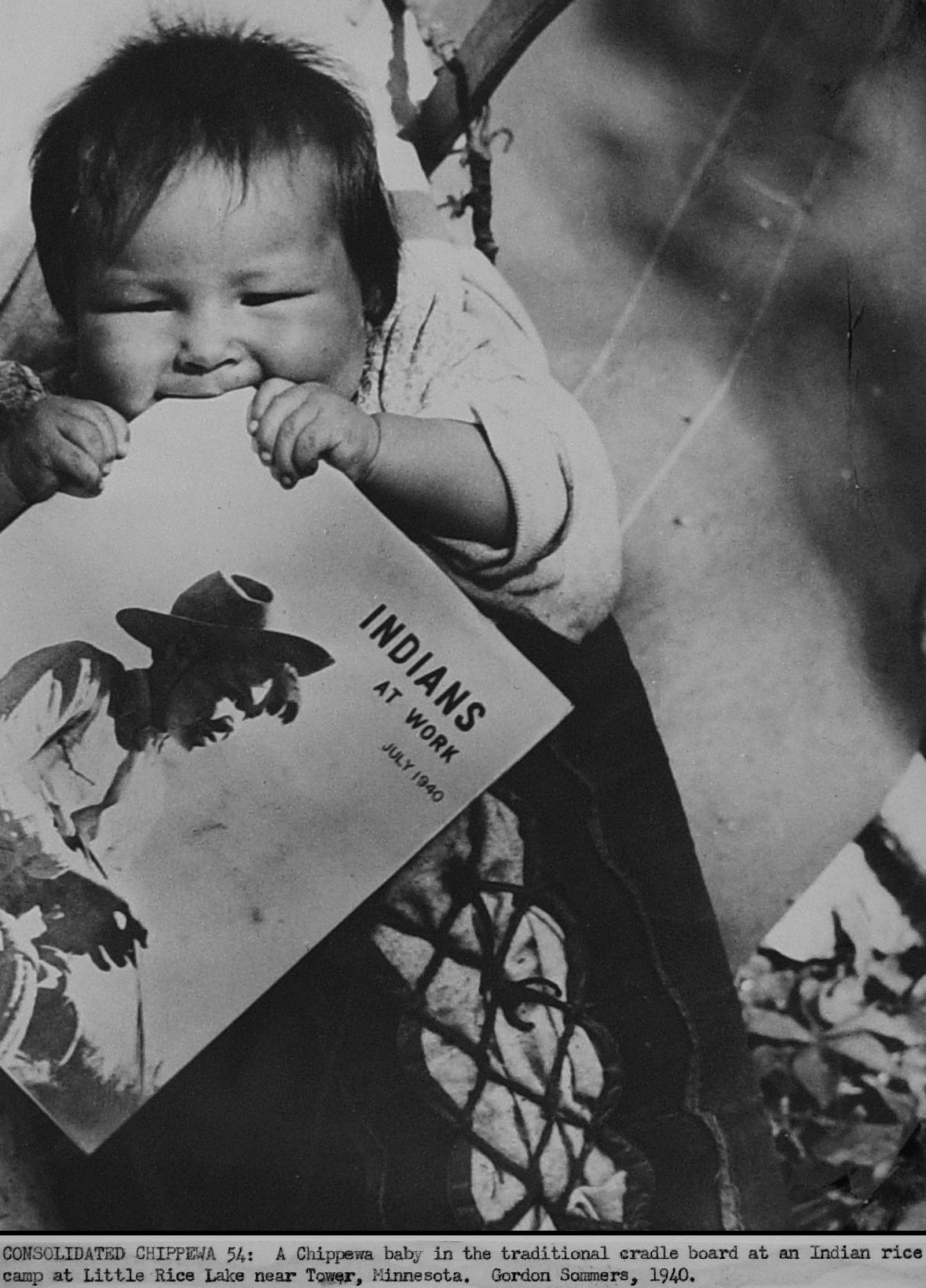
Chippewa baby waits on a cradleboard while parents tend rice crops (Minnesota, 1940).

The traditional diet of Native Americans has historically consisted of a combination of agriculture, hunting, and the gathering of wild foods, variable by bioregion.

Post-contact, European settlers in the northeastern region of the Americas observed that some of the Indigenous peoples cleared large areas for cropland. These fields in New England sometimes covered hundreds of acres. Colonists in Virginia noted thousands of acres under cultivation by Native Americans.

Native American agricultural communities have commonly used tools such as the hoe, maul, and dibber. The hoe is the main tool used to till the land and prepare it for planting; and later used for weeding. The first versions were made out of wood and stone. When the settlers brought iron, Native Americans switched to iron hoes and hatchets. The dibber was historically a digging stick, used to plant seeds. Once plants are harvested, traditionally women have prepared the produce for eating, using the maul to grind the corn into mash. It is then cooked and eaten that way or baked as corn bread.

== Religion ==
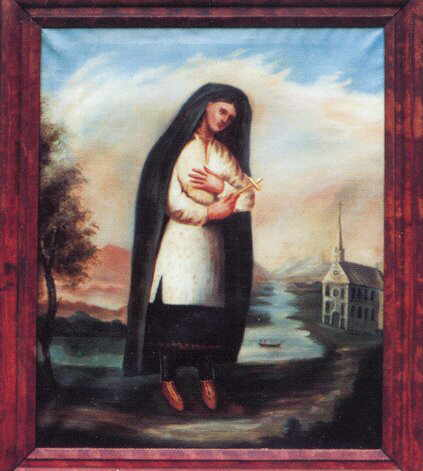
Kateri Tekakwitha, the patron of ecologists, exiles, and orphans, was beatified by the Roman Catholic Church.

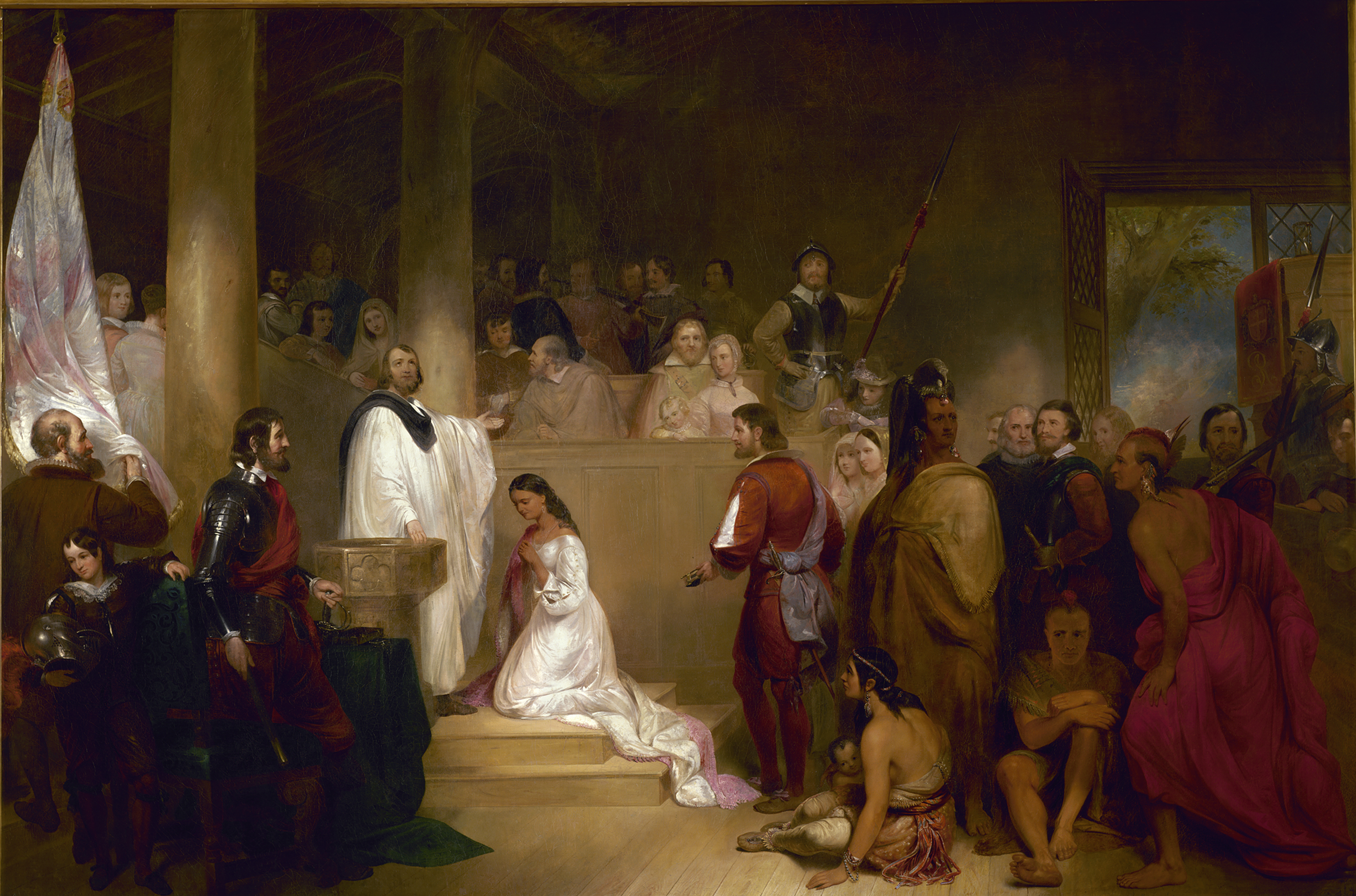
Baptism of Pocahontas was painted in 1840. John Gadsby Chapman depicts Pocahontas, wearing white, being baptized with the new name, Rebecca, by Anglican minister Alexander Whiteaker in Jamestown, Virginia; this event is believed to have taken place in 1613 or 1614.

Traditional Native American ceremonies are still practiced by many tribes and bands, and the older theological belief systems are still held by many of the traditional people. Many Plains tribes have sweatlodge ceremonies, though the specifics of the ceremony vary among tribes. Fasting, singing and prayer in the ancient languages of their people, and sometimes drumming, and dancing are also common.

The Midewiwin Lodge is a traditional medicine society based on the oral traditions and prophesies of the Ojibwa (Chippewa) and related tribes.

Another significant, though more recent, religious body among some Native Americans is the Native American Church. It is a syncretistic religion incorporating elements of Native spiritual practice from a number of different tribes. Some varieties also include elements from Christianity, while others do not. Its main rite is the peyote ceremony. Some tribes' traditional religious beliefs included Wakan Tanka. In the American Southwest, especially New Mexico, a syncretism between the Catholicism brought by Spanish missionaries and the Indigenous religions is common; the religious drums, chants, and dances of the Pueblo people are regularly part of Masses at Santa Fe's Saint Francis Cathedral. Native American-Catholic syncretism is also found elsewhere in the United States. (e.g., the National Kateri Tekakwitha Shrine in Fonda, New York and the National Shrine of the North American Martyrs in Auriesville, New York).

The eagle feather law (Title 50 Part 22 of the Code of Federal Regulations) stipulates that only individuals of certifiable Native American ancestry enrolled in a federally recognized tribe are legally authorized to obtain eagle feathers for religious or spiritual use. The law does not allow Native Americans to give eagle feathers to non-Native Americans.

== Gender roles ==
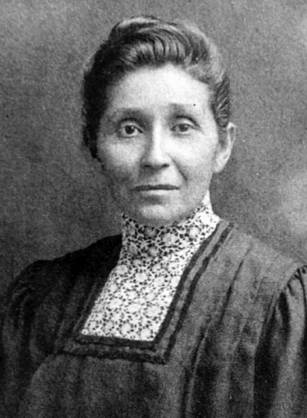
Dr. Susan La Flesche Picotte was the first Native American woman to become a physician in the United States.

Gender roles can vary significantly between tribal nations, with patriarchal, matriarchal, and egalitarian traditions among the 574 federally-recognized tribes.

Many tribes, such as the Haudenosaunee Six Nations and the Southeast Muskogean tribes, are traditionally matrilineal, with property and hereditary leadership passed through the maternal lines, and children belonging to their mother's and grandmother's clan. Others were patrilineal tribes, such as the Omaha, Osage and Ponca, where hereditary leadership passed through the male line, and children were considered to belong to the father and his clan.

Historically, when European-American male settlers had children with Native American women, if the tribe was patrilineal, their children were considered "white" like their fathers. If the mother was from a matrilineal tribe, the children would be considered tribal members. While rules have, in most cases, been modernized so the sex of the parent is irrelevant, historically the children of white fathers could have no official place in a patrilineal tribe because their fathers did not belong to it, unless they were adopted by a tribalmale and made part of his family.

In most of the Plains Nations, men traditionally hunt, trade and go to war. The women have traditionally held primary responsibility for the survival and welfare of the families (and future of the tribe). Traditionally, Plains women own the home, and tend to jobs such as gathering and cultivating plants for food and healing, along with caring for the young and the elderly, making clothing and processing and curing meat and skins. Plains women have historically tanned hides to make clothing as well as bags, saddle cloths, and tipi covers, and have used cradleboards to carry an infant while working or traveling.

Several dozen tribes have been documented to practiced polygyny to sisters, with procedural and economic limits.

Apart from making homes, women traditionally hold many additional responsibilities essential for the survival of the tribes, including the manufacture of weapons and tools, maintenance of the roofs of their homes, as well as historically participating in the bison hunts. In some of the Plains Indian tribes, medicine women gathered herbs and cured the ill.

The Lakota, Dakota, and Nakota girls have traditionally been encouraged to learn to ride, hunt and fight. Though fighting was predominantly the duty of men and boys, occasionally women fought as well, especially if the tribe was severely threatened.

== Sports ==
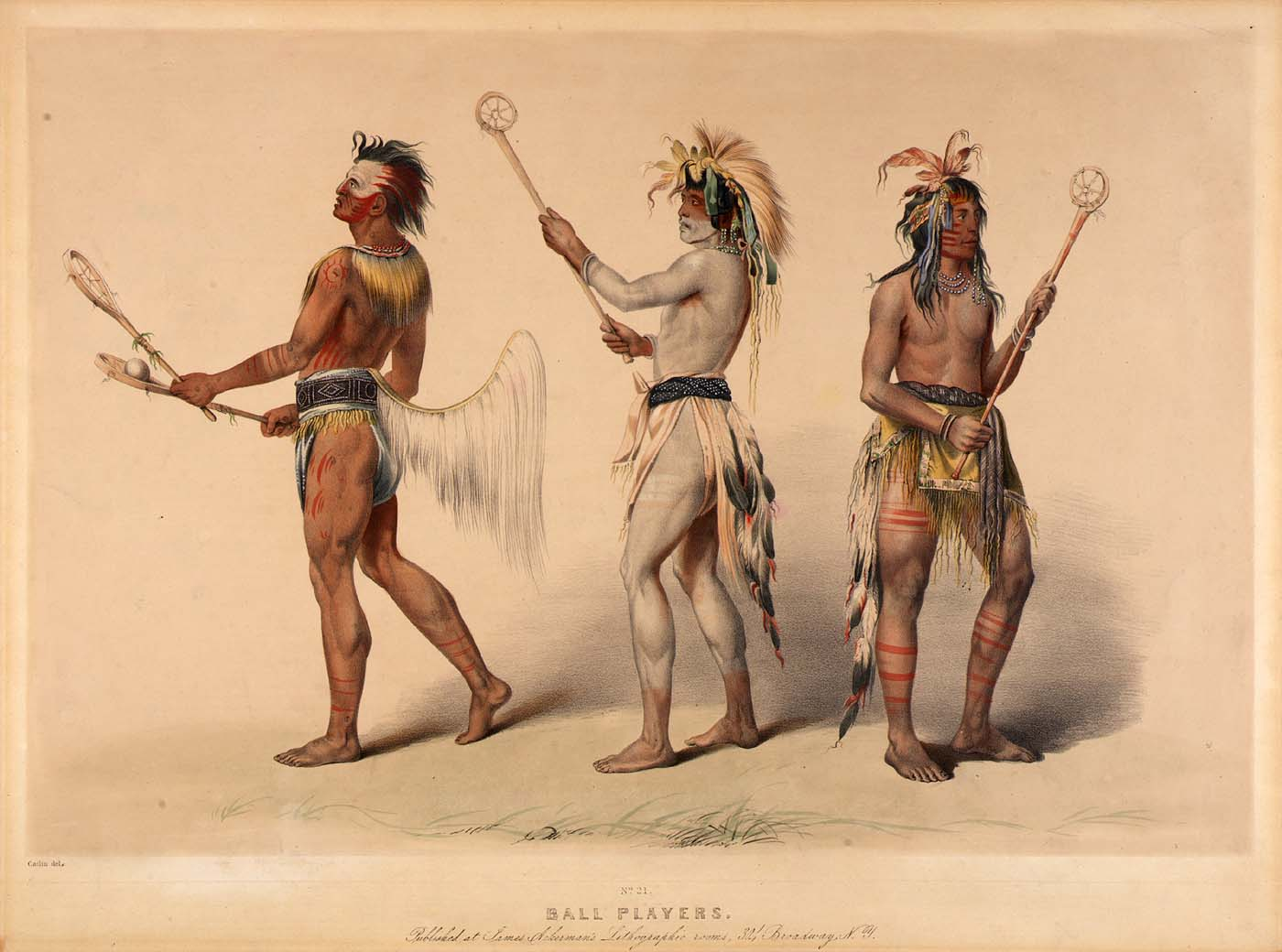
Ball players from the Choctaw and Lakota tribe as painted by George Catlin in the 1830s

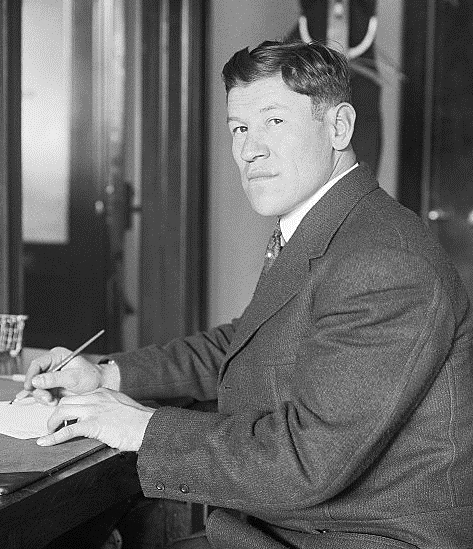
Jim Thorpe was called the "greatest athlete in the world" by king Gustaf V of Sweden

Notable Native American athletes include Jim Thorpe, Joe Hipp, Notah Begay III, Jacoby Ellsbury, and Billy Mills.

=== Team based ===
Native American ball sports, such as lacrosse, stickball, or baggataway, have historically been used to settle disputes, rather than going to war, as a civil way to settle potential conflict. The Choctaw called it isitoboli ("Little Brother of War"); the Onondaga name was dehuntshigwa'es ("men hit a rounded object"). There are three basic versions, classified as Great Lakes, Iroquoian, and Southern.

The game is played with one or two rackets/sticks and one ball. The object of the game is to land the ball on the opposing team's goal (either a single post or net) to score and to prevent the opposing team from scoring on your goal. The game involves as few as 20 or as many as 300 players with no height or weight restrictions and no protective gear. The goals could be from around 200 feet (61 m) apart to about 2 miles (3.2 km); in Lacrosse the field is 110 yards (100 m).

== Music ==
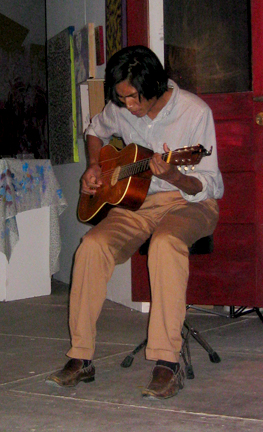
Jake Fragua, Jemez Pueblo from New Mexico

Native American musicians have occasionally found broader fame in more mainstream American music. Artists such as Robbie Robertson (The Band) and Redbone have had success on the rock and pop charts. Some, such as John Trudell, and Blackfoot have used music as political commentary and part of their work as activists for Native American and First Nations causes. Others, such as flautists Charles Littleleaf record traditional instruments with an aim of preserving the sounds of nature, or in the case of R. Carlos Nakai, integrate traditional instruments with more modern instrumentation. A variety of small and medium-sized recording companies offer an abundance of contemporary music by Native Americans and descendants, ranging from pow-wow drum music to rock-and-roll and rap.

A popular Native American musical form is pow wow drumming and singing, which happens at events like the annual Gathering of Nations in Albuquerque, New Mexico. One form involves members of drum groups sitting in a circle around a large drum, playing in unison while they sing together in their Indigenous language. Often they are accompanied by dancers in colorful regalia. Most Indigenous communities in the United States also maintain private, traditional songs and ceremonies, which are only shared within the community.

== Art ==
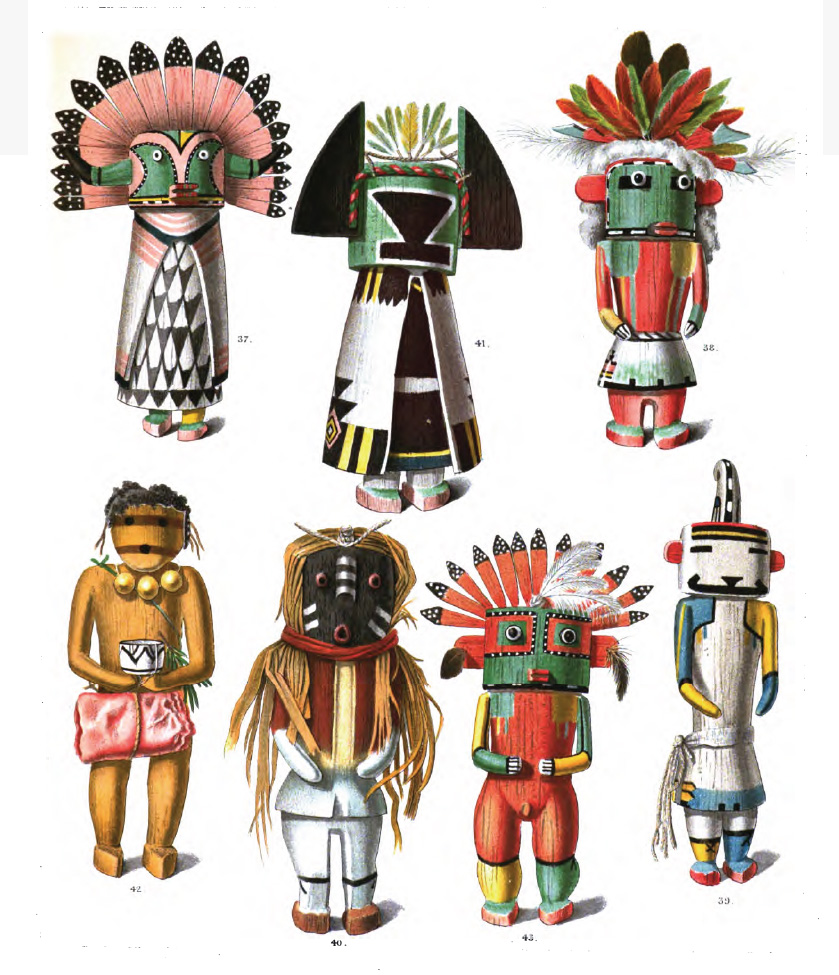
Drawings of kachina dolls, from an 1894 anthropology book.

== Writing and communication ==
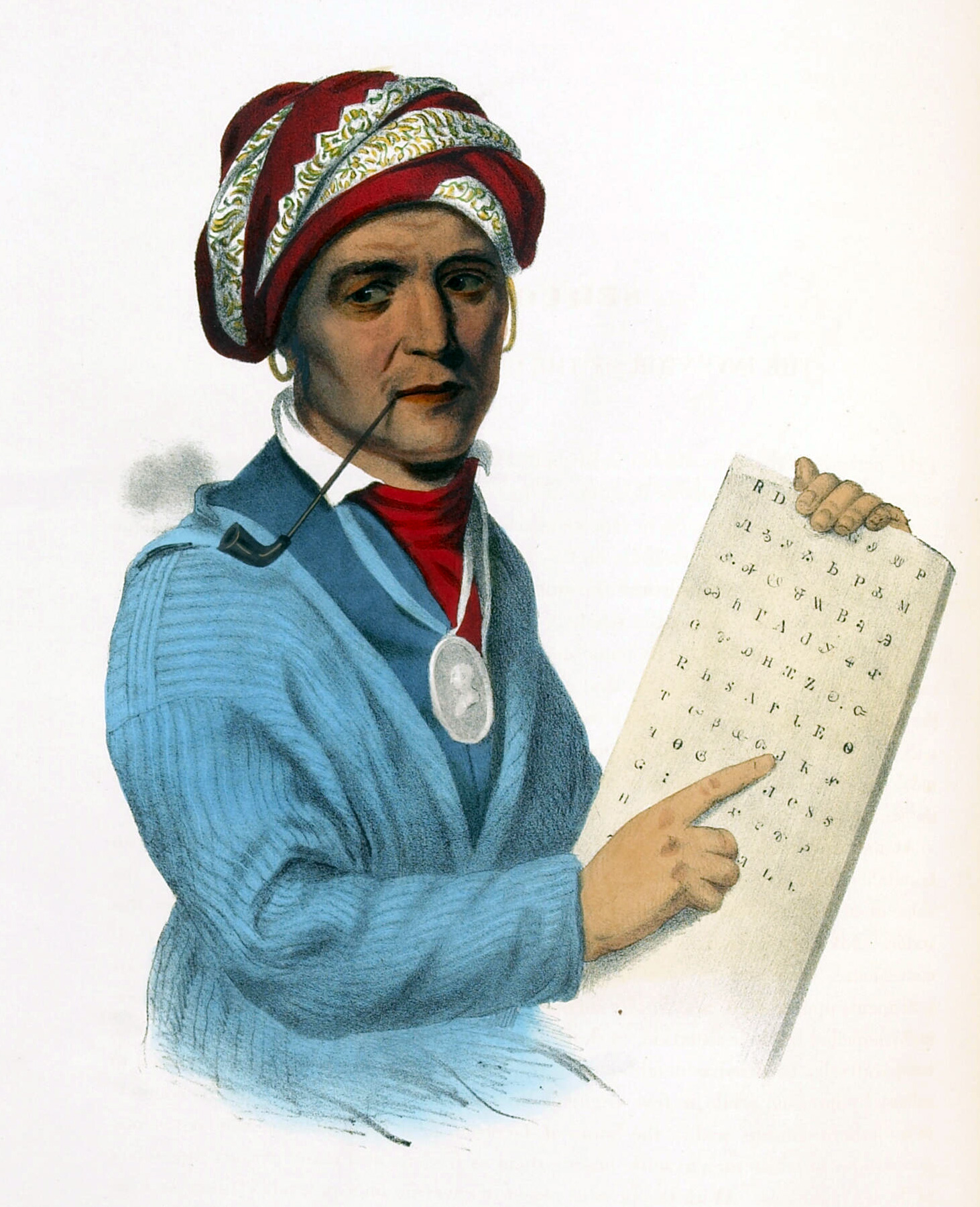
Sequoyah, inventor of the Cherokee syllabary

Native Americans in the United States have developed several original systems of communication, both in Pre-Columbian times, and later as a response to European influences. For example, the Iroquois, living around the Great Lakes and extending east and north, used strings or belts called wampum that served a dual function: the knots and beaded designs mnemonically chronicled tribal stories and legends, and further served as a medium of exchange and a unit of measure. The keepers of the articles were seen as tribal dignitaries.

A widely used form of communication historically, that is still in use to some extent today is Plains Indian Sign Language (PISL), also known as Hand Talk, Plains Sign Language and First Nation Sign Language. PISL is a trade language (or international auxiliary language), formerly a trade pidgin, that was once the lingua franca across central Canada, central and western United States and northern Mexico, used among the various Plains Nations. It is also used for story-telling, oratory, various ceremonies, and by deaf people for ordinary daily use.

In the late 1810s and early 1820s, the Cherokee syllabary was invented by the silversmith Sequoyah to write the Cherokee language. His creation of the syllabary is particularly noteworthy as he could not previously read any script. He first experimented with logograms, before developing his system into a syllabary. In his system, each symbol represents a syllable rather than a single phoneme; the 85 (originally 86) characters provide a suitable method to write Cherokee. Although some symbols resemble Latin, Greek, and Cyrillic letters, the relationship between symbols and sounds is different.

The success of the Cherokee syllabary inspired James Evans, a missionary in what is now Manitoba, during the 1840s to develop Cree syllabics. Evans had originally adapted the Latin script to Ojibwe (see Evans system), but after learning of the Cherokee syllabary, he experimented with invented scripts based on his familiarity with shorthand and Devanagari. When Evans later worked with the closely related Cree, and ran into trouble with the Latin alphabet, he turned to his Ojibwe project and in 1840 adapted it to the Cree language. The result contained just nine glyph shapes, each of which stood for a syllable with the vowels determined by the orientations of these shapes. Cree syllabics are primarily a Canadian phenomenon, but are used occasionally in the United States by communities that straddle the border.

== Relationships with other cultures ==
Relationships between Native Americans, European-Americans, and African-Americans have taken different forms over many generations since European contact. Some of the first documented cases of European/Native American intermarriage and contact were recorded in Post-Columbian Mexico. One case is that of Gonzalo Guerrero, a European from Spain, who was shipwrecked along the Yucatan Peninsula, and fathered three Mestizo children with a Mayan noblewoman. Another is the case of Hernán Cortés and his mistress La Malinche, who gave birth to another of the first multi-racial people in the Americas.

=== Assimilation ===
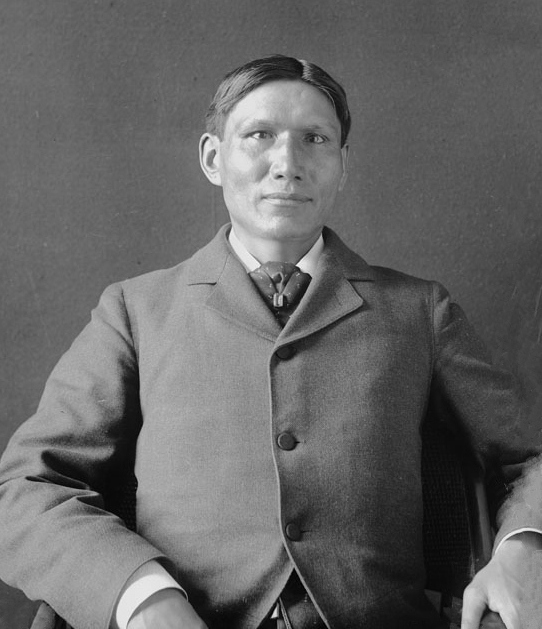
Charles Eastman was one of the first Native Americans to become certified as a medical doctor, after he graduated from Boston University.

European impact was immediate, widespread, and profound—more than any other cultural groups that had contact with Native Americans during the early years of colonization and nationhood. There was fear on both sides, as both peoples realized how different their societies were. The whites regarded the Indians as "savage" because they were not Christian, and were suspicious of cultures which they did not understand. The Native American author, Andrew J. Blackbird (Odawa), wrote in his History of the Ottawa and Chippewa Indians of Michigan, (1897), that white settlers introduced some immoralities into Native American tribes. Many Indians suffered because the Europeans introduced alcohol and the whiskey trade resulted in alcoholism among the people, who were alcohol-intolerant.

=== Slavery ===
A number of Native American tribes took captives in war, but usually these captives were able to later become full members of the community via adoption or marriage. While this has been called "slavery" by some anthropologists, none of the named tribes exploited slave labor on a large scale. In addition, Native Americans did not buy and sell captives in the pre-colonial era, although they sometimes exchanged captives with other tribes in peace gestures or in exchange for their own members.

The conditions of enslaved or hostage Native Americans varied among the tribes. In many cases, young captives were adopted into the tribes to replace warriors killed during warfare or by disease. Other tribes practiced debt slavery or imposed slavery on tribal members who had committed crimes; but, this status was only temporary as the enslaved worked off their obligations to the tribal society.

Among some Pacific Northwest tribes, about a quarter of the population were enslaved. Other North American tribes that participated in some form of enslavement were the Comanche of Texas, the Creek of Georgia, the Pawnee, and Klamath. There was heavy incentive by colonizing Europeans to adopt slavery, and it was most common among tribes who were allied with the British.

==== European enslavement ====
During the European colonization of North America, the practice of slavery changed dramatically. As the demand for labor in the West Indies grew with the cultivation of sugar cane, European settlers frequently transported enslaved Native Americans to the Caribbean to work on plantations. White settlers in European colonies established in the American South purchased or captured Native Americans to use as forced labor in cultivating tobacco, rice, and indigo on plantations as well. Accurate records of the numbers enslaved do not exist. Scholars estimate tens of thousands of Native Americans may have been enslaved by the Europeans, sometimes being sold by Native Americans themselves but often war prizes with Europeans, similar to what occurred in the aftermath of the Pequot War. Slavery in Colonial America soon became racialized, including Native Americans and Africans but excluding Europeans. The Virginia General Assembly defined some terms of slavery in 1705:

All servants imported and brought into the Country... who were not Christians in their native Country... shall be accounted and be slaves. All Negro, mulatto and Indian slaves within this dominion ... shall be held to be real estate. If any slave resists his master ... correcting such slave, and shall happen to be killed in such correction ... the master shall be free of all punishment ... as if such accident never happened.

— Virginia General Assembly declaration, 1705

The slave trade of Native Americans lasted only until around 1730. It gave rise to a series of devastating wars among the tribes, including the Yamasee War. The Indian Wars of the early 18th century, combined with the increasing importation of African slaves, effectively ended the Native American slave trade by 1750. Colonists found that Native American slaves could easily escape, as they knew the country. The wars cost the lives of numerous colonial slave traders and disrupted their early societies. The remaining Native American groups banded together to face the Europeans from a position of strength. Many surviving Native American peoples of the southeast strengthened their loose coalitions of language groups and joined confederacies such as the Choctaw, the Creek, and the Catawba for protection.

Native American women were at risk for rape whether they were enslaved or not; during the early colonial years, settlers were disproportionately male. They turned to Native women for sexual relationships. Both Native American and African enslaved women suffered rape and sexual harassment by male slaveholders and other white men.

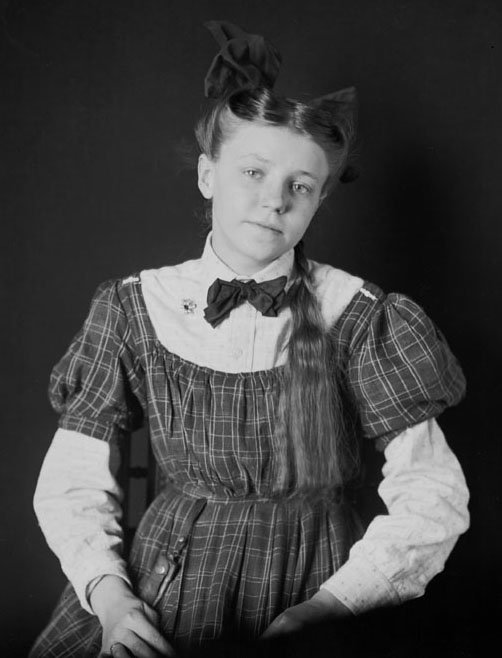
Lillian Gross, described as a "Mixed Blood" by the Smithsonian source, was of Cherokee and European-American heritage. Raised within Cherokee culture, she identified with that.

=== Relation with Africans in the United States ===
African and Native Americans have interacted for centuries. The earliest record of Native American and African contact occurred in April 1502, when Spanish colonists transported the first Africans to Hispaniola to serve as slaves.

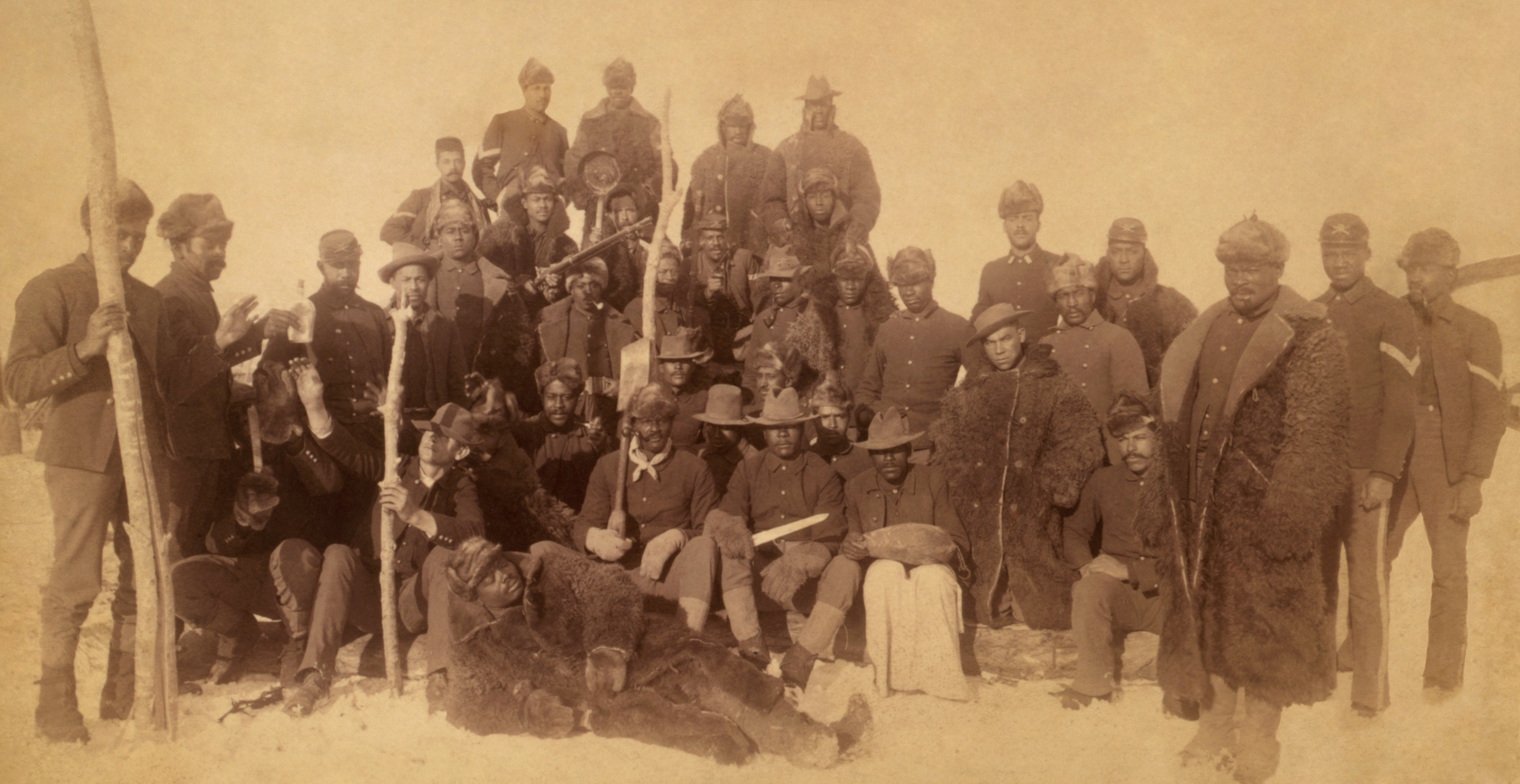
Buffalo Soldiers, 1890. The nickname was given to the "Black Cavalry" by the Native American tribes they fought.

Native Americans were rewarded if they returned escaped slaves, and African Americans were rewarded for fighting in the late 19th-century Indian Wars.

While numerous tribes used captive enemies as servants and slaves, they also often adopted younger captives into their tribes to replace members who had died. In the Southeast, a few Native American tribes began to adopt a slavery system similar to that of the American colonists, buying African American slaves, especially the Cherokee, Choctaw, and Creek. Though less than 3% of Native Americans owned slaves, divisions grew among the Native Americans over slavery. Among the Cherokee, records show that slave holders in the tribe were largely the children of European men that had shown their children the economics of slavery. As European colonists took slaves into frontier areas, there were more opportunities for relationships between African and Native American peoples.

Among the Five Civilized Tribes, mixed-race slaveholders were generally part of an elite hierarchy, often based on their mothers' clan status, as the societies had matrilineal systems. As did Benjamin Hawkins, European fur traders and colonial officials tended to marry high-status women, in strategic alliances seen to benefit both sides. The Choctaw, Creek and Cherokee believed they benefited from stronger alliances with the traders and their societies. The women's sons gained their status from their mother's families; they were part of hereditary leadership lines who exercised power and accumulated personal wealth in their changing Native American societies. The chiefs of the tribes believed that some of the new generation of mixed-race, bilingual chiefs would lead their people into the future and be better able to adapt to new conditions influenced by European Americans.

== Philosophy ==
Native American authors have written about aspects of "tribal philosophy" as opposed to the modern or Western worldview. Thus, Yankton Dakota author Vine Deloria Jr. in an essay "Philosophy and the Tribal Peoples" argued that whereas a "traditional Westerner" might reason, "Man is mortal; Socrates is a man; therefore, Socrates is mortal," aboriginal thinking might read, 'Socrates is mortal, because I once met Socrates and he is a man like me, and I am mortal.' Deloria explains that both of the statements assume that all men are mortal, and that these statements are not verifiable on these grounds. The line of Native American thinking, however uses empirical evidence through memory to verify that Socrates was in fact a man like the person originally making the statement, and enhances the validity of the thinking. Deloria made the distinction, "whereas the Western syllogism simply introduces a doctrine using general concepts and depends on faith in the chain of reasoning for its verification, the Native American statement would stand by itself without faith and belief." Deloria also comments that Native American thinking is very specific (in the way described above) compared to the broadness of traditional Western thinking, which leads to different interpretations of basic principles. American thinkers have previously denounced Native ideas because of this narrower approach, as it leads to 'blurry' distinctions between the 'real' and the 'internal.'

According to Carlin Romano, the best resource on a characteristically "Native American Philosophy" is Scott L. Pratt's, Native Pragmatism: Rethinking the Roots of American Philosophy, which relates the ideas of many 'American' philosophers like Pierce, James, and Dewey to important concepts in early Native thought. Pratt's publication takes his readers on a journey through American philosophical history from the colonial time period, and via detailed analysis, connects the experimental nature of early American pragmatism to the empirical habit of indigenous Americans. Though Pratt makes these alliances very comprehensible, he also makes clear that the lines between the ideas of Native Americans and American philosophers are complex and historically difficult to trace.

== See also ==
- Native Americans in the United States
- Native American identity in the United States
- Indigenous languages of the Americas
