= Red Earth (band) =

US musical group

- Red Earth Performing in Albuquerque, New Mexico's El Rey Theater

Background information
- Origin: Albuquerque, New Mexico, U.S.
- Genres: Native American Music, Rock, Funk, World fusion
- Years active: 1997–present
- Members: Ira Wilson - lead vocals, rhythm guitar Jeff Duneman - drum set, percussion Carlo Bluehouse Johnson - lead guitar John Simms - trumpet, keyboards Captain Raab - bass, vocals Blake Minnerly - saxophone, vocals
- Past members: Charley Baca - lead & rhythm guitar Kenneth Beaupre - trombone Monica Delgado - trumpet Ernesto Encinas - saxophone John Horse - guitar Hideki Imai - trombone Adrian Wall - bass, hand drum Christian Orellana - percussion, vocals Jason Botten - trumpet

Red Earth is an American rock band from Albuquerque, New Mexico which has released three independent albums.

== Career ==
Red Earth was started by musicians from various backgrounds and representing various tribal nations from Dineh, Jemez Pueblo, Isleta Pueblo, Laguna Pueblo, Chicanas/os, Lakotas, mixed-nations, and biiliigaanaa (white) brothers and sisters. The band formed from jam sessions in downtown Albuquerque, New Mexico in the basement of a rented house at 410 8th Street in 1995. Red Earth quickly became a local favorite band and started playing around various cities, towns, pueblos, and across the Southwest, notably on numerous Indian Reservations and music festivals. True to their diverse Southwest roots, the band combines Indigenous experiences and insights with energetic combinations of funk, rock, heavy metal, reggae, ska, Latin music, and jazz influences. They dubbed their sound, "Tribal Stew." The band won a Native American Music Award (or NAMMY) for their 1999 debut album, "When Worlds Collide". For the album "When Worlds Collide" they worked with Casper Lomayesva and Third Mesa Music from Phoenix, Arizona. In August 2001, the band was invited to perform in Brittany, France, as a part of the 'Chants du Monde' world music festival. They also added to their international performances by playing on several occasions across the border in Mexico.

In 2000, Red Earth released a 5-song EP, Live! recorded at the Electric 49. The band spent much of 2002 and early 2003 recording their studio follow up, "Zia Soul", which found them working with Ozomatli's Wil-Dog Abers and musicians ranging from the Navajo Nation to Brazil. The album won "World Music Album of the Year" at the 6th annual Native American Music Awards in 2003. "Zia Soul" received critical acclaim around the Southwest and in Native American music circles, but it remains the band's last studio album. Throughout the years, Red Earth's line-up has changed on several occasions with the addition and departure of different members (see list).

In 2004 the band was invited to perform at the opening of the Smithsonian National Museum of the American Indian on the Mall in Washington, DC, and the following summer was invited play in New York City at Lincoln Center Out of Doors.

Leaving their mark on the New Mexico music scene, Red Earth created and organized the Electric 49, an annual concert that was held during the weekend of the annual Gathering of Nations Pow-wow in Albuquerque. The festival featured Native American rock, hip-hop, and reggae performers. The festival ran from 1998 through 2005.

In 2006 it was announced there would be no Electric 49 that year, but that the band had not broken up. With several members out of the state of New Mexico, the band has performed only sporadically since 2006. In April 2010, the band performed two reunion shows in Albuquerque during the Gathering of Nations week, and later performed two more shows in Santa Fe during Indian Market week in August. Despite members living in several states, they hope to continue performing when possible.

== Discography ==
- When Worlds Collide (1999)
- Red Earth Live (2001)
- Zia Soul (2003)
