= Zia Soul =

Studio album by Red Earth
- Released: 2003
- Recorded: 2002–2003
- Label: Tribal Stew (USA)
- Producer: Self-produced

Zia Soul is an album by Red Earth, released in 2003. It won "World Music Album of the Year" at the 2003 Native American Music Awards. "Fly to the Sun" featured production by Wil-Dog Abers of Ozomatli, who worked with the group on preproduction.

== Track listing ==
1. Intro: US Highway 666
2. Fly to the Sun
3. Antenado
4. Key of Pain
5. Phat Albert, Jr.
6. Red Delicious
7. The Fourth World
8. Life in Babylon
9. Waiting for the Rain
10. Pouring Down
11. Rez Rocket
12. The Atomic Batucada
13. Santa Fake
14. More American
15. 4:38
16. Zia Soul
17. Outro: The End of the Trail

== Personnel ==
Red Earth:

- Ira Wilson – Lead Vocals, Background Vocals, Lead & Rhythm Guitar
- Jeff Duneman – drums, percussion, Background Vocals
- Carlo Bluehouse Johnson – Lead & Rhythm Guitar, Bass guitar, Background Vocals
- Hideki Imai – Trombone, Background Vocals, Percussion, Lead Vocals
- John Simms – Trumpet, Trombone, Background Vocals, Synthesizer
- Captain Raab – Bass guitar, Guitar, Synthesizer, Background Vocals, Drum Machine
- Ernesto Encinas – Saxophone, Background Vocals
- Christian Orellano – percussion, Background Vocals
- Charley Baca – guitar
- Adrian Wall- Bass guitar
