= Miss Indian World =

National beauty pageant competition in the United States

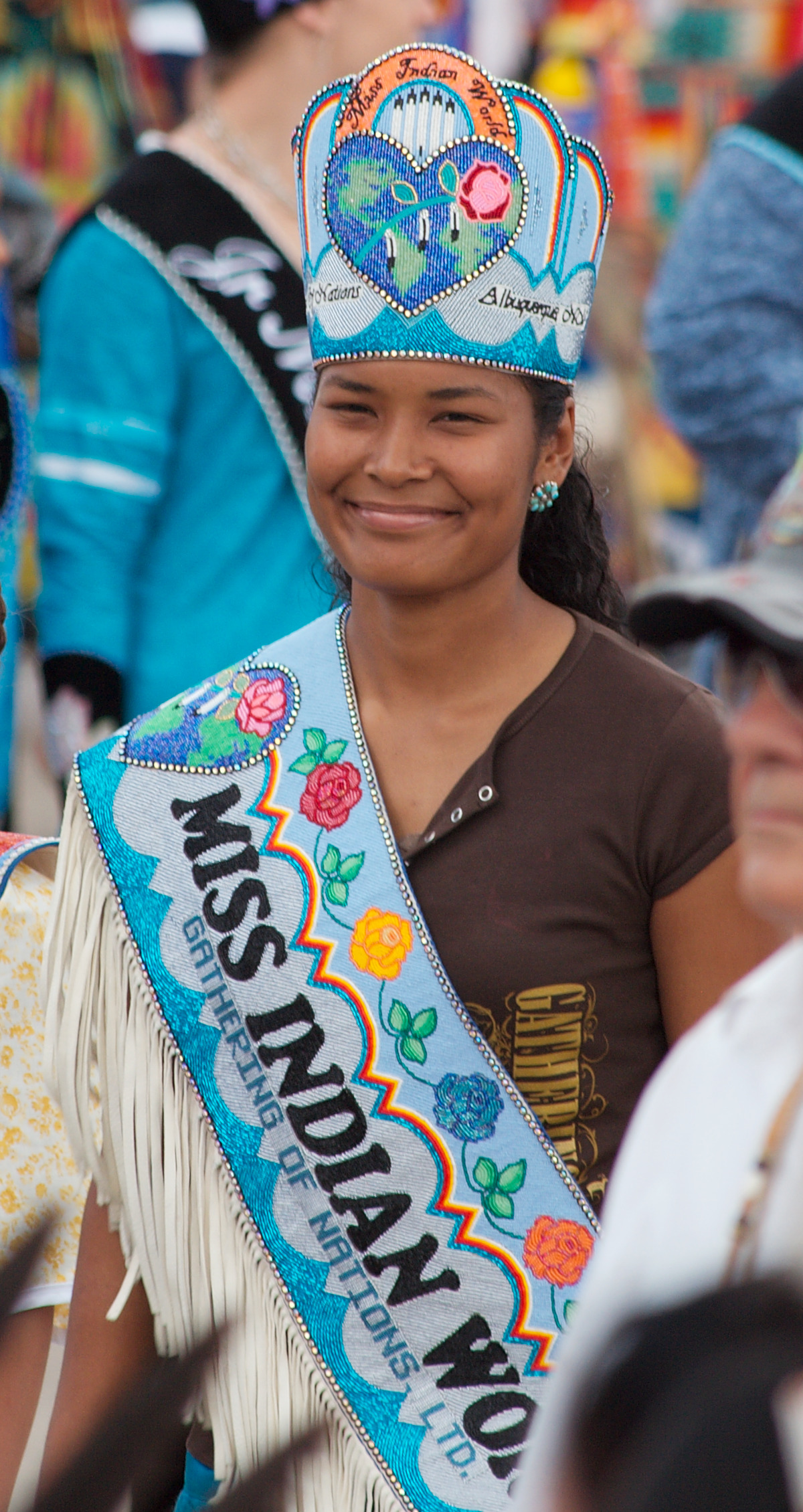
Nicole Alek'aq Colbert, Miss Indian World 2008, at the Indian Summer festival in Milwaukee

Founded in 1983, Miss Indian World is a five-day competition held in Albuquerque, New Mexico. The event is part of the annual Gathering of Nations, the largest Native American powwow in the world. Young women from across North America represent their tribes and communities as they compete to win the crown. Rather than emphasizing contestants' outward appearance, Miss Indian World aims to select a winner who demonstrates a deep understanding of her culture, traditions, people and history.

Once awarded the title, Miss Indian World acts as a cultural representative, promoting individually-selected platforms, sharing Native American culture, and representing the annual Gathering of Nations event. This role is important to the native community because it helps perpetuate traditions and overturn negative stereotypes.

In addition to the title, Miss Indian World also wins prize money, the Miss Indian shawl and banner, a four-day ocean cruise, and a travel stipend to attend powwows, conferences, workshops, and festivals. Previous Miss Indian World winners have continued to be sought-after speakers, even after they have passed on the crown.

After 42 years it announced 2026 would be the last year for the annual Gathering of Nations, with Dania Wahwasuck being the final Miss Indian World.

== Competition requirements ==
To qualify for Miss Indian World, contestants must be native or indigenous Americans between the ages of 18 and 24 as age requirements were updated for the 2018 pageant with a verifiable tribal affiliation. They must also be single, never married, and have no dependents.

Each contestant participates in four categories: Public Speaking and Personal Interviews, Traditional Talent Presentation, Dance Competition, and Essay. Contestants are evaluated based on their skill, as well as cultural knowledge about tribes and traditions. The woman who accumulates the most points in each category will hold the Miss Indian World title for one year.

== Winner history ==
Year	Miss Indian World	Tribe
2025	Dania Wahwasuck	Prairie Band Potawatomi Nation /Pyramid Lake Paiute
2024	Kassie John	Navajo Nation
2023	Tori McConnell	Yurok Tribe/Karuk Tribe
2022	Tashina Red Hawk	Rosebud Sioux Tribe
2019–21	Cheyenne Kippenberger	Seminole Tribe of Florida
2018	Taylor Susan	White Mountain Apache/Walker River Paiute Tribes
2017	Raven Swamp	Mohawk Nation of the Haudenosaunee Confederacy (Resigned February 2018)
2016	Danielle Ta'Sheena Finn	Standing Rock Sioux
2015	Cheyenne Brady	Sac and Fox /Cheyenne /Pawnee /Otoe / Kiowa-Apache /Hidatsa/Arikara /Tonkawa
2014	Taylor Thomas	Shoshone Bannock
2013	Kansas K. Begaye	Navajo Nation
2012	Jessa Rae GrowingThunder-Slivers	Ft. Peck Assiniboine and Sioux
2011	Marjorie Tahbone	Inupiaq and Kiowa
2010	Dakota Brant	Mohawk
2009	Brooke Grant	Hoopa, Yurok, Karuk and Chippewa
2008	Nicole Alek'aq (Colbert) Kaganak	Yup'ik
2007	Megan Young	Poarch Band of Creek Indians
2006	Violet (John) Duncan	Plains Cree/Taíno
2005	Cassie Thomas	Seneca Nation
2004	Delana Smith	Red Lake Band of Ojibwe
2003	Onawa Lacy	Navajo Nation/Mescalero Apache
2002	Tia Smith	Cayuga/Iroquois of the Six Nations Reserve
2001	Ke Aloha May Cody Alo	White Mountain Apache
2000	Lillian ‘Cepa’ Sparks	Rosebud and Lakota Sioux
1999	Mitzi Tolino	White Mountain Apache/Navajo Nation
1998	April Whittemore	Lumbee
1997	Shayai Lucero	Pueblo of Acoma/Pueblo of Laguna
1996	Andrea Jack	Tlingit/Yupik
1995	Crystal Pewo-Lightfoot	Apache of Oklahoma/Kiowa
1994	J.C. Lonetree	Ho-Chunk Nation
1993	Gloria Snow	Stoney Nakoda First Nation
1992	Lanette Asepermy	Cheyenne/Kiowa
1991	Janet Saupitty	Comanche
1990	LoVina Louie	Coeur d'Alene/ Okanagan & Lakes Band of the Colville Confederated Tribes
1989	Tammy Deann Billey	Choctaw Nation of Oklahoma
1988	Prairie Rose Little Sky	Oglala Sioux Tribe
1987	Jovanna Plenty (August – April)	Cree/Assiniboine
1987	Celeste Tootoosis (April – August)	Cree/Assiniboine
1986	Lisa Ewauk	Nakoda/Dakota
1985	Shelly Valdez	Pueblo of Laguna
1984	Codi High Elk	Cheyenne River Sioux

== See also ==
- List of beauty contests
- Miss Indigenous Canada
- Miss Indian America
