= Miss Indigenous Canada =

National beauty pageant competition in Canada

- Formation: 2024; 2 years ago
- Type: Beauty pageant
- Location: Canada
- Official language: English
- Director: Aleria McKay
- Website: www.missindigenouscanada.ca

Miss Indigenous Canada is a national community leadership development and ambassador program in Canada exclusively for women and Two-Spirit of Indigenous Canadian background. Women of First Nations, Inuit and Métis background represent their communities in a competition which focuses on their character, community service, cultural involvement, and ambassadorship for their communities.

Four categories are performed: personal interview, personal essay, cultural presentation, and community scrapbook. The highest scorers are then placed in a final question competition to determine the winner. The inaugural winner for the 2024 competition was Jessica McKenzie of the Opaskwayak Cree Nation.

== Background ==
Miss Indigenous Canada was founded by Aleria McKay of the Six Nations of the Grand River First Nation, a former Miss Teenage Ontario in 2018. It primarily focuses on connection to community and culture, with competitors being judged on their ambassadorship, character, community service, and cultural involvement. During the competition, participants are judged in four categories: an interview, personal essay, cultural presentation, and community scrapbook. The highest scoring individuals are then judged in a prepared statement and final question competition to determine the final winner. Charles Lefebvre writing for CTV News described the competition as "not a beauty pageant, but instead focused on Indigenous traditions, culture and leadership." The event was created in order for young Indigenous women to celebrate their abilities and achievements, make connections, work to serve their communities, and promote cultural involvement and connection.

Indigenous (First Nations, Inuit, Métis) women with a verifiable community affiliation between the ages of 18 and 30 years of age are eligible for the competition. The competition is inclusive of married women and two-spirited individuals. A component of the competition is to raise funds for a chosen charity. Participants are required to raise a minimum of $100 for the organization as a charitable donation.

The contest lasts for five days, the initial pool of candidates is narrowed down to ten, then five finalists. The inaugural sash and crown was designed by Kymberly Farmer.

== History ==
The first Miss Indigenous Canada was held on the Six Nations of the Grand River Reserve, beginning July 24, 2024 and lasted for three days. The first day consisted of workshops, activities, guest speakers, and museum tours. 700 individuals had applied to the pageant, and 26 were selected to compete. The victor was Jessica McKenzie of Opaskwayak Cree Nation, her victory was celebrated by the Assembly of Manitoba Chiefs. McKenzie's presentation focused on her grandfather, a residential school survivor, photographer, trapper, and radio producer. The first runner-up was Meiyah Whiteduck of the Algonquins of Pikwàkanagàn First Nation, the second runner-up was Sarah Lewis of Curve Lake First Nation, and the third runner-up was Sereena Nahmabin of Aamjiwnaang First Nation. Six additional awards were given to contestants: academic achievement to Jaida Gregg (Lac Seul First Nation), public speaking to Ocean Bruyere (Sagkeeng First Nation), traditional knowledge to Jade Mukash (Whapmagoostui), charitable giving to third runner-up Sereena Nahmabin, congeniality to victor Jessica McKenzie, and community service to Reegan Starr Maracle (Mohawks of the Bay of Quinte First Nation).

== Titleholders ==
Year	Represented	Miss Indigenous Canada	Location	Entrants
2024	Opaskwayak Cree Nation	Jessica McKenzie	Six Nations of the Grand River, Ontario	26
2025	Sagkeeng First Nation	Gena Boubard	Six Nations of the Grand River, Ontario	19
2026	Cold Lake First Nations	Brooke Metchewais	Six Nations of the Grand River, Ontario	20

== See also ==
- List of beauty contests
- Miss Indian World – National beauty pageant competition in the United States
- Miss Indian America – Pageant from 1953 to 1984 in Sheridan, Wyoming, US
