= Scott L. Pratt =

American philosopher (born 1959)

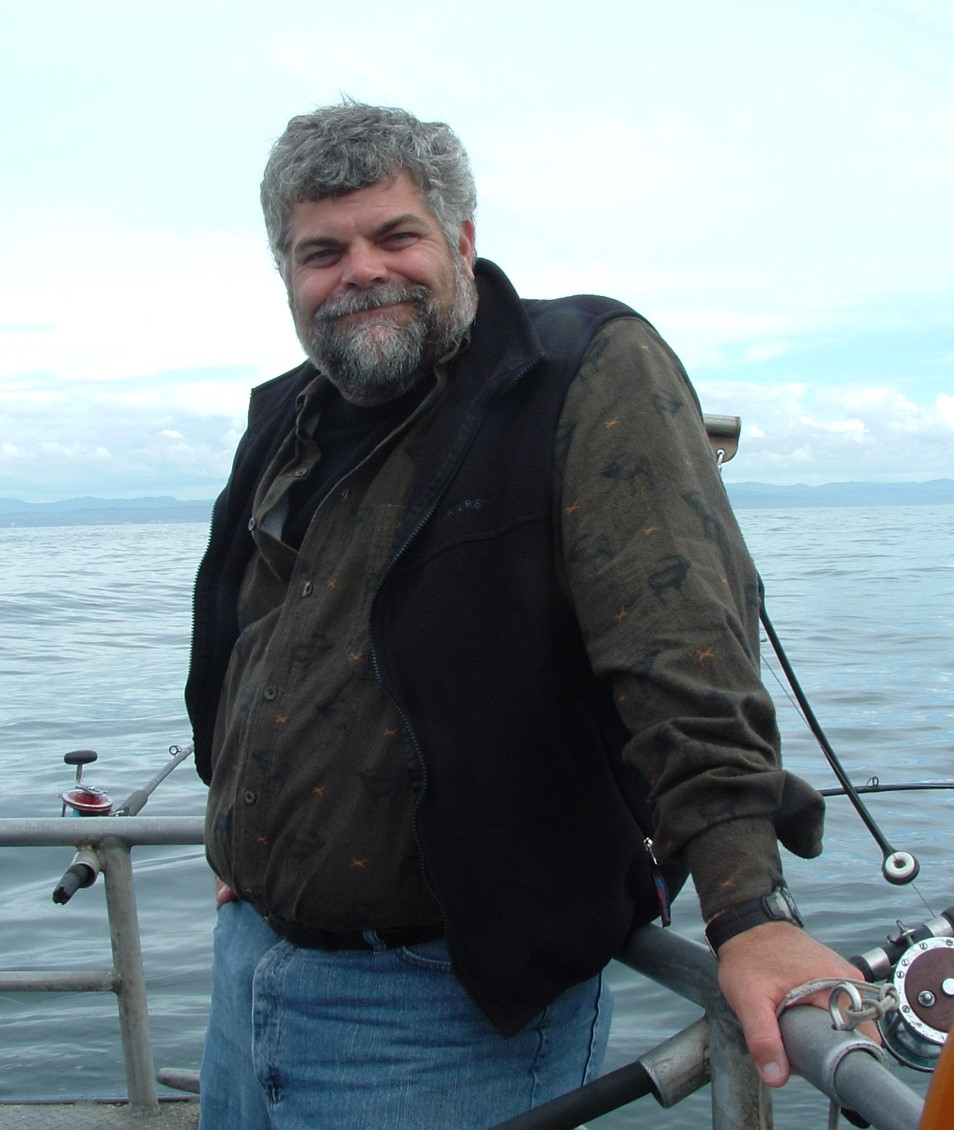
Scott L. Pratt

Scott L. Pratt (born 1959) is a professor of philosophy at the University of Oregon. His research and teaching is focused primarily upon American philosophy, especially in the areas of Native American philosophy, pragmatism, philosophy of race and gender, philosophy of education, and the history of logic. He has previously served in various administrative roles at the University of Oregon, including executive vice provost for academic affairs (2017–2019), dean of the graduate school (2015–2017), and associate dean for the humanities in the College of Arts and Sciences (2006–2009).

== Biography ==
Pratt was born in Rock Falls, Illinois. He briefly attended Sewanee: The University of the South before transferring to Beloit College, where he graduated with a BA in philosophy. Pratt worked in college admissions for the next dozen years, before attending graduate school at the University of Minnesota. Pratt completed his PhD in 1995, writing his dissertation on John Dewey's philosophy of education, and began his career at the University of Oregon that year. He is a member of the Society for the Advancement of American Philosophy, and served in various leadership roles, including as President (2016–2018).

In 2003, he was one of the founding members of the Josiah Royce Society and has served as president of that organization as well. Pratt also served as editor of the Transactions of the Charles S. Peirce Society, one of the foremost journals dedicated to American philosophy. During his two+ decades of work at the University of Oregon, he has supervised dozens of PhD candidates and been appointed to positions including the director of graduate studies, associate dean for the humanities, dean of the graduate school, and executive vice provost for academic affairs. From 2009 to 2012, Pratt was instrumental in the organization of a faculty union at the University of Oregon, and has served on the union's executive council and participated in collective bargaining on behalf of faculty.

== Works ==
Pratt's philosophical work primarily focuses on the history and development of American philosophy. In Native Pragmatism, Pratt argues that the contributions of indigenous peoples to American philosophy have been overlooked and/or actively ignored. Contesting the dominant narrative that American pragmatism was the product of the "genius" of a small group of Harvard philosophers – such as Louis Menand's The Metaphysical Club (2001) – or that American philosophy is the product solely of European intellectual inheritances – e.g. Herbert Schneider's History of American Philosophy (1946) – Pratt argues that "the central commitments of the later classical pragmatism of Charles S. Peirce, William James, and John Dewey are apparent much earlier in Native American thought, particularly within Northeastern Native traditions. These commitments...are pre-figured in indigenous thought at a time when European thought in America was marked by a set of contrary commitments."

Pratt provides a genealogy of pragmatism that traces its roots to indigenous thinkers, highlighting the continuity of themes such as philosophical pluralism, contextualism, and resistance, and suggesting that the influence of Native philosophers on European American can be reasonably traced to interactions that took place in the seventeenth, eighteenth, and early nineteenth centuries. This spatial and temporal shift constitutes what sociologist Patricia Hill Collins refers to as much-needed criticism of "pragmatism's assumptions concerning power relations and social inequality...strategies [that are] crucial for reform."

Pratt continued this line of thought in American Philosophy: From Wounded Knee to the Present, co-authored with Erin McKenna. There, McKenna and Pratt's approach is "framed by the philosophical tradition itself and the commitment to a dynamic, pluralistic world of experience in which knowledge is a product of ongoing investigation, always limited in resources and scope, subject to failure, and liable to be overturned as the problems of the world change." Focused on the theme of philosophies of resistance, they include a significant number of figures typically excluded from the philosophical tradition, such as Simon Pokagon, Ida Wells-Barnett, and T. Thomas Fortune, among others. Pratt and McKenna's history was described as "timely and provocative" by Gregory Pappas. He further added that the book demonstrated that "there is a rich strand of philosophy in America with its own history and shared principles that are still available and perhaps never more important."

Pratt's Presidential Address for the Society of the Advancement of American Philosophy in 2018, "So Much Has Been Destroyed," reinforced the argument that American philosophy must reckon with its legacy of exclusion of non-Euro-American philosophers. "My claim...is that American philosophers must consider the genocide of Indigenous Americans in their work...the American philosophical bequest depends on a response to America's first offense."

In addition to his work on the nature and history of American philosophy, Pratt has researched history of logic, with particular attention in indigenous logics and the logical system of Josiah Royce.

== Bibliography ==
=== Author ===
- Native Pragmatism: Rethinking the Roots of American Philosophy (2002)
- Logic: Inquiry, Argument, and Order (2015)
- American Philosophy: From Wounded Knee to the Present (with Erin McKenna; 2015)

=== Editor ===
- American Philosophies: An Anthology (2002)
- The Philosophical Writings of Cadwallader Colden (2002)
- Race Questions, Provincialism and Other American Problems (2009)
- Jimmy Buffett and Philosophy (2009)
