= Gathering of Nations =

Native American pow-wow held in New Mexico

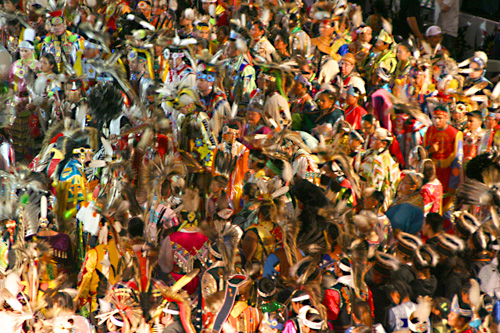
- Gathering of Nations, Albuquerque, NM - April 2007
- Genre: Pow wow
- Dates: 24-26, April 2025
- Locations: Expo New Mexico; 300 San Pedro NE; Albuquerque, NM 87108
- Years active: Since 1983; 43 years ago, at the University of New Mexico
- Attendance: Over 105,000 (2023)
- Website: Official website

The Gathering of Nations is the largest pow-wow in the United States and North America. It is held annually on the fourth weekend in April, on the Powwow Grounds at Expo NM, in Albuquerque, New Mexico. Over 565 tribes from around the United States and 220 from Canada travel to Albuquerque to participate. Tens of thousands of spectators attend each year. The event has a significant economic impact, generating approximately $24 million for Albuquerque in 2019. The Gathering of Nations employs nearly 300 people during the event. The parent company, Gathering of Nations, Ltd. produces the annual powwow. The pow-wow in 2026 will be the final year that the event is held, according to Gathering of Nations Ltd.

== Competitions within the pow-wow ==
=== Dance ===
Dance competitions are held in 36 categories, including different age group categories such as Elders (70+), Golden Age (55+), Adults (19+), Teens, and Tiny Tots. Gathering of Nations founder Derek Matthews says thousands of dancers compete each year. The Grand Entry is the part of the powwow where thousands of dancers in full regalia enter into the powwow arena at the same time.

=== Drum groups and drummers ===
Drum groups and individual drummers compete, as well. There are two categories of drum competitions, northern drums and southern drums, which differ in beats.

=== Horse & Rider Regalia Parade and competition ===
Started in 2018, the Horse & Rider Regalia Parade showcases traditional attire and honoring the horse culture among tribes. Riders also display their horse-handling skills. Competitor categories include women's, men's, and Best in Show, and prizes include cash and an embroidered horse blanket. Sisters Dustina and Leela Abrahamson are co-coordinators of the parade, which takes place on Friday and Saturday during the powwow.

=== Miss Indian World ===
A pageant for Miss Indian World is held each year. The winner is chosen based upon personality, knowledge of tribal traditions, and dancing ability. In 2024, Kassie John from the Navajo Nation was crowned Miss Indian World.

=== Singing ===
There are several competitions for singers, including the Northern Singers, Southern Singers, and Women's Back-Up Singing.

== Indian Traders Market ==
The Indian Traders Market features artists, crafters, and traders selling Native American and Indigenous arts and crafts. Jewelry-makers include silversmiths and bead workers. In 2010, there were around 800 artists, crafters, and vendors at the Indian Traders Market.

== History ==
The Gathering of Nations was founded by Derek Mathews.

The Gathering of Nations has been held at different event locations in Albuquerque, New Mexico. Dating back to at least 1990 through 2016 it was held at the University of New Mexico, most often at the UNM Arena (The Pit), and at the football stadium in 2010. In May 2017, the Gathering of Nations, Limited parted ways with the University of New Mexico, not only affecting the location of future pow wows, but also ending the Gathering of Nations Scholarship Fund. Part of the proceeds earned at the pow wow went toward the fund, which helped pay for students to attend the University. The scholarship had been active for 27 years, supporting over 100 students. The powwow has been held at Tingley Coliseum on the EXPO New Mexico grounds, previously known as the New Mexico State Fair, since the 2017 Gathering of Nations. Organizers of the 2020 event pivoted from an in-person gathering to one that streamed video in order to abide by COVID-19 lock down mandates. The pow wow streamed fully virtually in 2021 as well, but in 2022 the event was held in person once again.

On August 17, 2025, Gathering of Nations officials announce that the Gathering of Nations event in Albuquerque, New Mexico, United States, will host its final pow-wow in 2026.

== Popular and social movements ==
The Gathering of Nations has been a hub for advancing popular and social movements. At the 1991 Gathering of Nations, Olympic gold medalist Billy Mills and Donny Belcourt, who qualified for the 1992 Olympic trials, spoke about the formation of a separate American Indian Olympic team. Unite Now Indian Olympic Nation, or UNION, is the organization pushing for this team. At the 1992 Gathering of Nations, the Salute to Native American Olympians segment honored ten Native athletes including Andrew Sockalexis, Ben Nighthorse Campbell, William Mervin "Billy" Mills, Donnie Belcourt, Jim Thorpe, Henry Boucha, Wilson "Buster" Charles, Jesse Renick, Frank Mt. Pleasant, Ellison Brown, Clarence "Taffy" Abel, Frank Pierce, and Louis Tewanima.

During the 2000 pow wow, funds were raised to give actor and stunt double Running Deer a star on the Palm Springs Walk of Stars.

Musical artist Litefoot invited Andre 3000 to attend the Gathering of Nations after OutKast's performance of their song Hey, Ya at the 2004 Grammy's, which featured demeaning imagery of Native Americans.

At the 2019 powwow, the Gathering of Nations partnered with Miss Indian World and Congresswoman Deb Haaland and announced their united focus on the crisis of missing and murdered indigenous women in order to bring increased attention to this issue.

== Musical performances (non-competitive) ==
=== Stage 49 ===
In 2008, Stage 49, the contemporary music venue at the Gathering of Nations, was named as a performance space for Native musicians. Stage 49 hosts Indigenous traditional and contemporary artists, offering performances across genres like Rock, Blues, Reggae, Hip Hop, and more. Kevens is one artist who has played Stage 49. Additional artists playing here include the Levi Platero Band, One Way Sky, Warpath, and Doc Native, as well as QUESE IMC and Culture Shock Camp, Gabriel Ayala, Leanne Goose, Miracle Dolls, Casper, Digging Roots, Blues Nation, Arigon Starr, Gary Farmer and the Troublemakers, Keith Secola, Derek Miller, Eli Secody, Pamyua, Tracy Bone and J.C. Campbell, George Leach, and Red Earth.

=== Electric 49 ===
The Electric 49 was an annual Native American Music concert held at the Powwow.

The concert was created by the group Red Earth in 1998, and saw eight annual editions since that year. Since 2006, however, there has not been another festival, as Red Earth remains on hiatus. The Electric 49 focused on highlighting artistically challenging Native American Musicians throughout the Americas, and its goal was to highlight contemporary Native music.

Throughout the years, the Electric 49 has featured Lil Dre, Red Earth, The Cremains, Robert Mirabal, Ethnic DeGeneration, Star Nayea, Native Roots, Casper, Querosene Jacare (Jack) (of Brazil), Cisco, Derek Miller, Stoic Frame, DJ Abel and Quese IMC. The festival has had performances from diverse musical genres including: Heavy metal, Reggae, Blues, Hip hop, New Mexico music, and Waila (Chicken Scratch).

== Music album ==
The 2010 Gathering of Nations Pow Wow's album A Spirit's Dance, which was produced by SOAR records owner Tom Bee, won a Grammy award for Best Native American music album at the 53rd Annual Grammy Awards.

== See also ==
- Gathering of Nations Pow Wow 1999 (2000)
