= Linguistic homeland =

Region where a proto-language was spoken

In historical linguistics, the homeland or Urheimat (German: [ˈʔuːɐ̯ˌhaɪ̯maːt], lit. 'original home'; pl. Urheimaten) of a proto-language is the region in which it was spoken before splitting into different daughter languages. A proto-language is the reconstructed or historically attested parent language of a group of languages that are genetically related.

Depending on the age of the language family under consideration, its homeland may be known with near-certainty (in the case of historical or near-historical migrations) or it may be very uncertain (in the case of deep prehistory). Next to internal linguistic evidence, the reconstruction of a prehistoric homeland makes use of a variety of disciplines, including archaeology and archaeogenetics.

== Methods ==
There are several methods to determine the homeland of a given language family. One method is based on the vocabulary that can be reconstructed for the proto-language. This vocabulary – especially terms for flora and fauna – can provide clues for the geographical and ecological environment in which the proto-language was spoken. An estimate for the time-depth of the proto-language is necessary in order to account for prehistorical changes in climate and the distribution of flora and fauna.

Another method is based on the linguistic migration theory (first proposed by Edward Sapir), which states that the most likely candidate for the last homeland of a language family can be located in the area of its highest linguistic diversity. This presupposes an established view about the internal subgrouping of the language family. Different assumptions about high-order subgrouping can thus lead to very divergent proposals for a linguistic homeland (e.g. Isidore Dyen's proposal for New Guinea as the center of dispersal of the Austronesian languages). The linguistic migration theory has its limits because it only works when linguistic diversity evolves continuously without major disruptions. Its results can be distorted e.g. when this diversity is wiped out by more recent migrations.

== Homelands of major language families ==
=== Western and central Eurasia ===
==== Indo-European ====
Map showing the present-day distribution of Indo-European languages in Eurasia (light green) and the likely Proto-Indo-European homeland (dark green)

The identification of the Proto-Indo-European homeland has been debated for centuries, but the steppe hypothesis is now widely accepted, placing it in the Pontic–Caspian steppe in the late 5th millennium BCE. The leading alternative is the Anatolian hypothesis, proposing a homeland in Anatolia in the early 7th millennium BCE.

==== Caucasian ====
The unrelated Kartvelian, Northwest Caucasian (Abkhaz-Adygean) and Northeast Caucasian (Nakh-Daghestanian) language families are presumed to be indigenous to the Caucasus. There is extensive evidence for contact between the Caucasian languages, especially Proto-Kartvelian, and Proto-Indo-European, indicating that they were spoken in close proximity at least three to four thousand years ago.

==== Dravidian ====
Although Dravidian languages are now concentrated in southern India, isolated pockets further north, placenames and substrate influences on Indo-Aryan languages indicate that they were once spoken more widely across the Indian subcontinent. Reconstructed Proto-Dravidian terms for flora and fauna support the idea that Dravidian is indigenous to India. Proponents of a migration from the northwest cite the location of Brahui, a hypothesized connection to the undeciphered Indus script, and claims of a link to Elamite.

==== Turkic ====
Turkic languages are today spoken across an area stretching from northwest China to the edge of Europe, but Proto-Turkic lexical items about the climate, topography, flora, fauna and subsistence point to a homeland in the taiga-steppe zone of southern Siberia and Mongolia around the Altai-Sayan region. Early contact with Mongolic languages also points to this area. Genetic studies suggest that most of the expansion of the language family was due to language replacement rather than migration, but have identified shared elements originating from the South Siberia-Mongolia area.

==== Uralic ====
Inherited tree names seem to indicate an Uralic homeland to the east of the Ural Mountains. The internal branching of the family suggests an area between the Ob River and Yenisey River. Uralic speakers are not genetically distinguished from their neighbours, but do share a genetic component that is of Siberian origin.

=== Eastern Eurasia ===
==== Japonic ====
Most scholars believe that Japonic was brought to northern Kyushu from the Korean Peninsula around 700 to 300 BCE by wet-rice farmers of the Yayoi culture, spreading from there throughout the Japanese archipelago and somewhat later to the Ryukyu Islands. There is fragmentary placename evidence that now-extinct Japonic languages were still spoken in central and southern parts of the Korean peninsula several centuries later.

==== Koreanic ====
All modern Koreanic varieties are descended from the language of Unified Silla, which ruled the southern two-thirds of the Korean peninsula between the 7th and 10th centuries. Evidence for the earlier linguistic history of the peninsula is extremely sparse. The orthodox view among Korean social historians is that the Korean people migrated to the peninsula from the north, but no archaeological evidence of such a migration has been found.

==== Sino-Tibetan ====
The reconstruction of Sino-Tibetan is much less developed than for other major families, so its higher-level structure and time depth remain unclear. Proposed homelands and periods include: the upper and middle reaches of the Yellow River about 4–8 kya, associated with the hypothesis of a top-level branching between Chinese and the rest (most likely); southwestern Sichuan around 9 kya, associated with the hypothesis that Chinese and Tibetan form a subbranch; Northeast India (the area of maximal diversity) 9–10 kya.

==== Hmong–Mien ====
The most likely homeland of the Hmong–Mien languages is in Southern China between the Yangtze and Mekong rivers, but speakers of these languages may have migrated from Central China as a result of the expansion of the Han Chinese.

==== Kra–Dai ====
Most scholars locate the homeland of the Kra–Dai languages in Southern China, possibly coastal Fujian or Guangdong.

==== Austroasiatic ====
Austroasiatic is widely held to be the oldest family in mainland Southeast Asia, with its current discontinuous distribution resulting from the later arrival of other families. The various branches share a great deal of vocabulary concerning rice cultivation, but few related to metals. Identification of the homeland of the family has been hampered by the lack of progress on its branching. The main proposals are Northern India (favoured by those who assume an early branching of Munda), Southeast Asia (the area of maximal diversity; most likely) and southern China (based on claimed loanwords in Chinese).

==== Austronesian ====
The homeland of the Austronesian languages is widely accepted by linguists to be Taiwan, since nine of its ten branches are found there, with all Austronesian languages found outside Taiwan belonging to the remaining Malayo-Polynesian branch.

=== North America ===
==== Eskimo–Aleut ====
The Eskimo–Aleut languages originated in the region of the Bering Strait or Southwest Alaska.

==== Na-Dené and Yeniseian ====
The Dené–Yeniseian hypothesis proposes that the Na-Dené languages of North America and the Yeniseian languages of Central Siberia share a common ancestor. Suggested homelands for this family include Central or West Asia, Siberia, or Beringia, but there is currently not enough evidence to resolve the question.

==== Algic ====
The Algic languages are distributed from the Pacific coast to the Atlantic coast of North America. It is suggested that Proto-Algic was spoken on the Columbia Plateau. From there, pre-Wiyot and pre-Yurok speakers moved southwest to the North Coast of California, while the pre-Proto-Algonquian speakers moved to the Great Plains, which was the center of dispersal of the Algonquian languages.

==== Uto-Aztecan ====
Some authorities on the history of the Uto-Aztecan language family place the Proto-Uto-Aztecan homeland in the border region between the USA and Mexico, namely the upland regions of Arizona and New Mexico and the adjacent areas of the Mexican states of Sonora and Chihuahua, roughly corresponding to the Sonoran Desert. The proto-language would have been spoken by foragers, about 5,000 years ago. Hill (2001) proposes instead a homeland further south, making the assumed speakers of Proto-Uto-Aztecan maize cultivators in Mesoamerica, who were gradually pushed north, bringing maize cultivation with them, during the period of roughly 4,500 to 3,000 years ago, the geographic diffusion of speakers corresponding to the breakup of linguistic unity.

=== South America ===
==== Tupian ====
Proto-Tupian, the reconstructed common ancestor of the Tupian languages of South America, was probably spoken in the region between the Guaporé and Aripuanã rivers, around 5,000 years ago.

=== Africa and Middle East ===
==== Afroasiatic ====
As Semitic is the only branch of Afroasiatic found outside Africa, northeast Africa is considered the most likely location of the Afroasiatic homeland. An alternative theory, based on lexical comparisons with Indo-European, proposes a Neolithic expansion from the Middle East. Proto-Afroasiatic is estimated to have begun to break up in the 8th millennium BCE. Proto-Semitic is thought to have been spoken in the Near East between 4400 and 7400 BCE, with Akkadian representing its earliest known branch.

==== Niger–Congo ====
Although the membership and subgrouping of the Niger–Congo remains unsettled, the widely-accepted core of the group includes over 1000 languages spoken from West Africa through most of Southern Africa. The homeland is thought to have been somewhere in the savanna belt of West Africa, with the Bantu expansion through the equatorial rainforests of Central Africa beginning around 3000 BCE.

==== Mande ====
Valentin Vydrin concluded that "the Mande homeland at the second half of the 4th millennium BC was located in Southern Sahara, somewhere to the North of 16° or even 18° of Northern latitude and between 3° and 12° of Western longitude." That is now Mauritania and/or southern Western Sahara.

==== Nilo-Saharan ====
The validity of the Nilo-Saharan family remains controversial. Proponents of the family view the border area between Chad, Sudan, and the Central African Republic as a likely candidate for its homeland from around the start of the Holocene.

==== Central Sudanic ====
The original homeland of Central Sudanic speakers is likely somewhere in the Bahr el Ghazal region.

==== Khoe–Kwadi ====
The homeland of Khoe–Kwadi was likely the middle Zambezi Valley over 2,000 years ago.

=== Australia ===
==== Pama–Nyungan ====
The Gulf Plains, located in the Northern Territory and Queensland, are the likely origin of the Pama–Nyungan languages.

== See also ==
- Genetic relationship (linguistics)
- Nationalist historiography
- Sprachbund

== Sources ==
- Anthony, David W. (2007), The Horse, the Wheel and Language: How Bronze-Age Riders from the Eurasian Steppes Shaped the Modern World, Princeton University Press
- Anthony, David; Ringe, Don (2015), "The Indo-European Homeland from Linguistic and Archaeological Perspectives", Annual Review of Linguistics, 1: 199–219, doi:10.1146/annurev-linguist-030514-124812
- Bellwood, Peter (2007) [1997]. Prehistory of the Indo-Malaysian Archipelago: Revised Edition. ANU E Press. ISBN 978-1-921313-12-7.
- Bellwood, Peter S. (2000), Presejarah Kepulauan Indo-Malaysia (Translation of Bellwood 2007)
- Blust, Robert (1984). "The Austronesian Homeland: A Linguistic Perspective". Asian Perspectives. 26 (1): 45–67. JSTOR 42928105.
- Campbell, Lyle (1997), American Indian Languages: The Historical Linguistics of Native America, Oxford University Press, ISBN 978-0-19-509427-5.
- ——— (2013), Historical Linguistics: An Introduction (3rd ed.), Edinburgh University Press, ISBN 978-0-7486-4601-2.
- Gray, Russell D.; Atkinson, Quentin D. (2003). "Language-tree divergence times support the Anatolian theory of Indo-European origin". Nature. 426 (6965): 435–439. Bibcode:2003Natur.426..435G. doi:10.1038/nature02029. PMID 14647380. S2CID 42340.
- Haak, Wolfgang; Lazaridis, Iosif; Patterson, Nick; Rohland, Nadin; Mallick, Swapan; Llamas, Bastien; Brandt, Guido; Nordenfelt, Susanne; Harney, Eadaoin; Stewardson, Kristin; Fu, Qiaomei; Mittnik, Alissa; Bánffy, Eszter; Economou, Christos; Francken, Michael; Friederich, Susanne; Pena, Rafael Garrido; Hallgren, Fredrik; Khartanovich, Valery; Khokhlov, Aleksandr; Kunst, Michael; Kuznetsov, Pavel; Meller, Harald; Mochalov, Oleg; Moiseyev, Vayacheslav; Nicklisch, Nicole; Pichler, Sandra L.; Risch, Roberto; Rojo Guerra, Manuel A.; Roth, Christina; Szécsényi-Nagy, Anna; Wahl, Joachim; Meyer, Matthias; Krause, Johannes; Brown, Dorcas; Anthony, David; Cooper, Alan; Alt, Kurt Werner; Reich, David (11 June 2015). "Massive migration from the steppe was a source for Indo-European languages in Europe". Nature. 522 (7555): 207–211. arXiv:1502.02783. Bibcode:2015Natur.522..207H. doi:10.1038/nature14317. PMC 5048219. PMID 25731166.
- Koerner, E. F. K. (2001). "Linguistics and Ideology in 19th and 20th Century Studies of Language". In Dirven, René; Hawkins, Bruce; Sandikcioglu, Esra (eds.). Language and Ideology: Volume 1: theoretical cognitive approaches. John Benjamins Publishing. pp. 253–276. ISBN 978-90-272-9954-3.
- Krishnamurti, Bhadriraju (2003). The Dravidian Languages. Cambridge University Press. ISBN 0-521-77111-0.
- Mallory, J.P. (1989), In Search of the Indo-Europeans: Language, Archaeology, and Myth, London: Thames & Hudson.
- Mallory, James P. (1997), "The homelands of the Indo-Europeans", in Blench, Roger; Spriggs, Matthew (eds.), Archaeology and Language, vol. I: Theoretical and Methodological Orientations, London: Routledge, ISBN 978-0-415-11760-9.
- Mallory, J.P.; Adams, D.Q. (2006), The Oxford introduction to Proto-Indo-European and the Proto-Indo-European world (Repr. ed.), Oxford [u.a.]: Oxford Univ. Press, ISBN 978-0-19-928791-8
- Pereltsvaig, Asya; Lewis, Martin W. (2015), "Searching for Indo-European origins", The Indo-European Controversy, Cambridge University Press, ISBN 978-1-107-05453-0
- Sohn, Ho-Min (1999), The Korean Language, Cambridge: Cambridge University Press, ISBN 978-0-521-36123-1.
