= Atsepar, California =

Former Yurok settlement in Humboldt County, California

Coordinates: 41.2279°N 123.6565°W

Atsepar (Yurok: ʼO Chepor; also spelled Otsepor) is a former Yurok settlement in Humboldt County, California, United States. Kroeber maps it on the Klamath River, south of the confluence of Bluff Creek and the Klamath, but above the confluence with the Trinity River. Waterman placed it on the Klamath, one-half mile south of the mouth of Bluff Creek.
