= Algic languages =

Indigenous language family of North America

Algic
- Algonquian–Ritwan; Algonquian–Wiyot–Yurok
- Geographic distribution: Northern North America
- Linguistic classification: One of the world's primary language families (or Algonquian–Wakashan?)
- Proto-language: Proto-Algic
- Subdivisions: Wiyot †; Yurok (†); Algonquian

Language codes
- ISO 639-5: aql
- Glottolog: algi1248
- Pre-contact distribution of Algic languages
- Notes: † - extinct language

The Algic languages (/ˈæl.ɡɪk/, AL-ghik), also Algonquian–Wiyot–Yurok or Algonquian–Ritwan, are an indigenous language family of North America. Most Algic languages belong to the Algonquian subfamily, dispersed over a broad area from the Rocky Mountains to Atlantic Canada. The other Algic languages are the Yurok and Wiyot of northwestern California, which, despite their geographic proximity, are not closely related to each other. All of these languages descend from Proto-Algic, a second-order proto-language, estimated to have been spoken about 5,000 years ago. This language is reconstructed using the reconstructed Proto-Algonquian language and the Wiyot and Yurok languages.

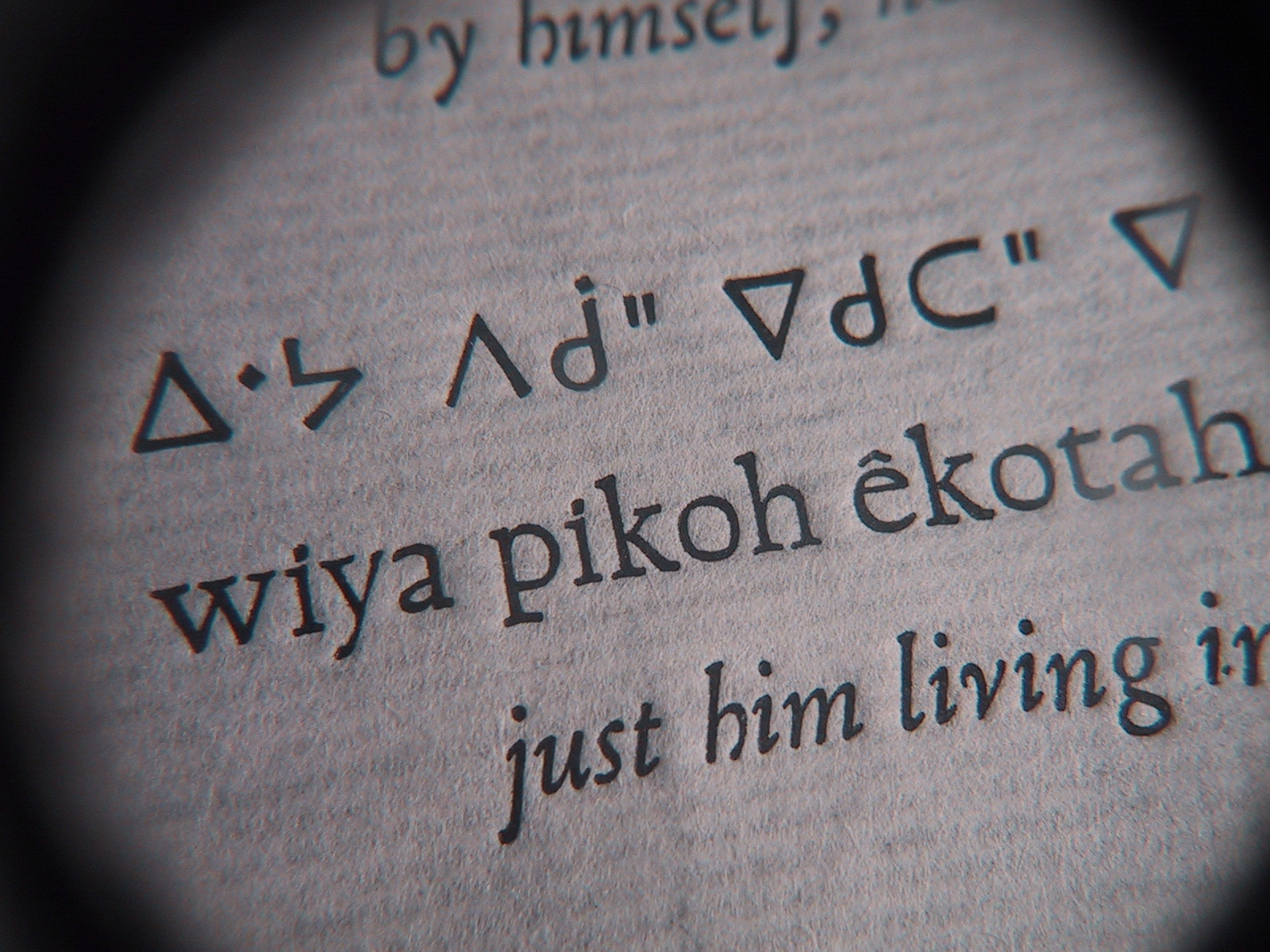
Text in Cree. Cree is the most widely spoken Algic language.

== History ==
The term Algic was coined by Henry Schoolcraft in his Algic Researches, published in 1839. Schoolcraft defined the term as "derived from the words Allegheny and Atlantic, in reference to the indigenous people anciently located in this geographical area". Schoolcraft's terminology was not retained. The peoples he called "Algic" were later included among the speakers of Algonquian languages. This language group is also referred to as "Algonquian-Ritwan" and "Wiyot-Yurok-Algonquian".

When Edward Sapir proposed that the well-established Algonquian family was genetically related to the Wiyot and Yurok languages of northern California, he applied the term Algic to this larger family. The Algic urheimat is thought to have been located in the Northwestern United States somewhere between the suspected homeland of the Algonquian branch (to the west of Lake Superior according to Ives Goddard) and the earliest known location of the Wiyot and Yurok (along the middle Columbia River according to Whistler).

== Classification of Algic ==
The genetic relation of Wiyot and Yurok to Algonquian was first proposed by Edward Sapir (1913, 1915, 1923), and argued against by Algonquianist Truman Michelson (1914, 1914, 1935). According to Lyle Campbell (1997), the relationship "has subsequently been demonstrated to the satisfaction of all". This controversy in the early classification of North American languages was called the "Ritwan controversy" because Wiyot and Yurok were assigned to a genetic grouping called "Ritwan". Most specialists now reject the validity of the Ritwan genetic node. Berman (1982) suggested that Wiyot and Yurok share sound changes not shared by the rest of Algic (which would be explainable by either areal diffusion or genetic relatedness); Proulx (2004) argued against Berman's conclusion of common sound changes.

More recently, Sergei Nikolaev has argued in two papers for a systematic relationship between the Nivkh language of Sakhalin and the Amur river basin and the Algic languages, and a secondary relationship between these two together and the Wakashan languages.

== Internal classification ==
The following tree follows the paradigm established by Goddard (1994) wherein Blackfoot was the first language to diverge from Proto-Algic, followed by Arapaho and Cree, then the Eastern Great Lakes or "Core Central" languages, and finally the Eastern Algonquian languages; this is reflected by "newer" languages being lower on the tree.

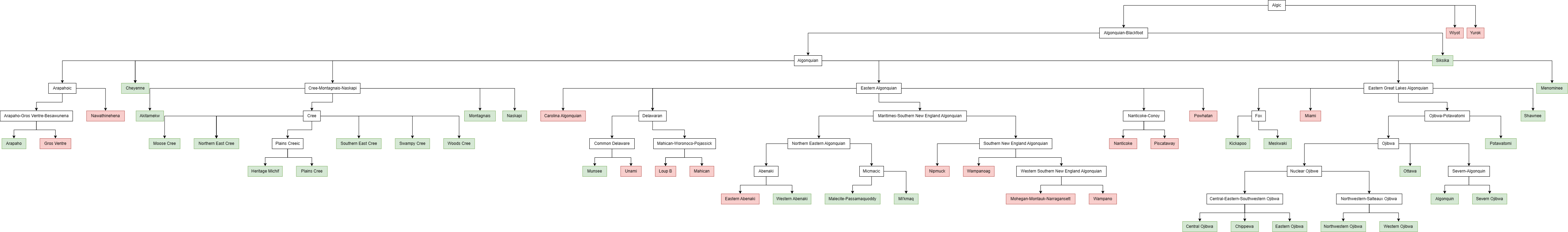
Family tree of the Algic languages

- Algic
  - †Wiyot
  - (†)Yurok
  - Algonquian
    - Blackfoot/Siksiká
    - Arapahoic
      - Arapaho
      - †Gros Ventre/Atsina
      - †Nawathinehena
    - Cree-Montagnais-Naskapi
      - Atikamekw (Note: Sometimes considered to be a dialect of Cree)
      - Cree (dialect continuum)
      - Innu
      - Naskapi
    - Cheyenne
    - Menominee
    - Eastern Great Lakes
      - Shawnee
      - Fox
        - Kickapoo
        - Sauk
      - Ojibwe-Potawatomi
        - Potawatomi
        - Ojibwe (dialect continuum)
      - †Miami
    - Eastern
      - Mi'kmaq
      - Maliseet-Passamaquoddy
      - Abenaki
        - †Eastern Abenaki
        - Western Abenaki
      - (†)Massachusett/Wampanoag
      - †Narragansett
      - †Mohegan-Pequot
      - †Quiripi
      - †Nanticoke
      - †Piscataway
      - †Powhatan
      - †Pamlico
      - †Etchemin
      - †Loup (Note: Possibly 5 different languages)
      - Delawaran
        - Munsee
        - †Unami
        - †Mahican

== Proto-language ==
Proto-Algic is an example of a second-order proto-language: its reconstruction depends on the reconstruction another proto-language (namely its descendant Proto-Algonquian), as well as the divergent branches of Wiyot and Yurok. As such, reconstruction of Proto-Algic is based on cross-examination of linguistic features between Proto-Algonquian, Wiyot, and Yurok.

== See also ==
- Algonquian–Wakashan languages

== Bibliography ==
- Berman, Howard (1982). "Two Phonological Innovations in Ritwan". International Journal of American Linguistics. 48 (4): 412–420. doi:10.1086/465750. ISSN 0020-7071. S2CID 144518292.
- Berman, Howard (July 1984). "Proto-Algonquian-Ritwan Verbal Roots". International Journal of American Linguistics. 50 (3): 335–342. doi:10.1086/465840. ISSN 0020-7071. S2CID 144285942.
- Campbell, Lyle (September 21, 2000) [1997]. American Indian Languages: The Historical Linguistics of Native America. New York: Oxford University Press. ISBN 978-0-19-509427-5.
- Goddard, Ives (1994). Cowan, William (ed.). "The West-to-East cline in Algonquian dialectology". Actes du Vingt-cinquième Congrès des Algonquinistes. 25. hdl:10088/21761.
- Goddard, Ives (1996). "Languages". In Sturtevant, W. C. (ed.). Handbook of North American Indians. Vol. 17. Washington, D. C.: Smithsonian Institution. ISBN 978-0-16-048774-3.
- Golla, Victor (September 20, 2011). California Indian languages. Berkeley. ISBN 9780520949522. OCLC 755008853.
- Haas, Mary R. (1958). "Algonkian-Ritwan: The End of a Controversy". International Journal of American Linguistics. 24 (3): 159–173. doi:10.1086/464453. ISSN 0020-7071. S2CID 143214234.
- Haas, Mary R. (1966). "Wiyot-Yurok-Algonkian and Problems of Comparative Algonkian". International Journal of American Linguistics. 32 (2): 101–107. doi:10.1086/464889. ISSN 0020-7071. S2CID 144355911.
- Michelson, Truman (1914). "Two Alleged Algonquian Languages of California". American Anthropologist. 16 (2): 361–367. doi:10.1525/aa.1914.16.2.02a00150. ISSN 0002-7294.
- Michelson, Truman. 1915. Rejoinder. American Anthropologist, n.s. 17:194–198.
- Michelson, Truman (1935). "Phonetic Shifts in Algonquian Languages". International Journal of American Linguistics. 8 (3/4): 131–171. doi:10.1086/463813. ISSN 0020-7071. S2CID 143895922.
- Mithun, Marianne (1999). The languages of Native North America. Cambridge: Cambridge University Press. ISBN 978-0-521-23228-9. (hbk); ISBN 0-521-29875-X.
- Moratto, Michael J. (1984). California archaeology. Academic Press. ISBN 9780125061803.
- Nikolaev, Sergei L. (2015). "Toward the reconstruction of Proto-Algonquian-Wakashan. Part 1: Proof of the Algonquian-Wakashan relationship". Journal of Language Relationship. 13 (1): 23–61. doi:10.31826/jlr-2015-131-206. S2CID 212688261.
- Nikolaev, Sergei L. (2016). "Toward the reconstruction of Proto-Algonquian-Wakashan. Part 2: Algonquian-Wakashan sound correspondences". Journal of Language Relationship. 13 (4): 289–328. doi:10.31826/jlr-2016-133-408. S2CID 212688688.
- Proulx, Paul (1982). "Yurok Retroflection and Vowel Symbolism in Proto-Algic". Kansas Working Papers in Linguistics. 7: 119–123. doi:10.17161/KWPL.1808.3621. hdl:1808/3621. ISSN 1043-3805.
- Proulx, Paul (1984). "Proto-Algic I: Phonological Sketch". International Journal of American Linguistics. 50 (2): 165–207. doi:10.1086/465826. ISSN 0020-7071. S2CID 144185501.
- Proulx, Paul (1985). "Proto-Algic II: Verbs". International Journal of American Linguistics. 51 (1): 59–93. doi:10.1086/465860. ISSN 0020-7071. S2CID 143787643.
- Proulx, Paul (1991). "Proto-Algic III: Pronouns". Kansas Working Papers in Linguistics. 16: 129–170. doi:10.17161/KWPL.1808.429. hdl:1808/429. ISSN 1043-3805.
- Proulx, Paul (1992). "Proto-Algic IV: Nouns". Kansas Working Papers in Linguistics. 17: 11–57. doi:10.17161/KWPL.1808.644. hdl:1808/644. ISSN 1043-3805.
- Proulx, Paul (1994). "Proto-Algic V: Doublets and their Implications". Kansas Working Papers in Linguistics. 19 (2): 115–182. doi:10.17161/KWPL.1808.321. hdl:1808/321. ISSN 1043-3805.
- Proulx, Paul (2004). "Proto Algic VI: Conditioned Yurok Reflexes of Proto Algic Vowels". Kansas Working Papers in Linguistics. 27: 124–138. doi:10.17161/KWPL.1808.1247. hdl:1808/1247. ISSN 1043-3805.
- Sturtevant, William C., ed. (1978). Handbook of North American Indians. Vol. 1–20. Washington, D. C.: Smithsonian Institution.
- Sapir, Edward (1913). "Wiyot and Yurok, Algonkin languages of California". American Anthropologist. 15 (4): 617–646. doi:10.1525/aa.1913.15.4.02a00040. ISSN 0002-7294.
- Sapir, E. (1922). "Algonkin languages of California: A reply". American Anthropologist. 17 (1): 188–198. doi:10.1525/aa.1915.17.1.02a00270. ISSN 0002-7294.
- Sapir, Edward (1922). "The Algonkin affinity of Yurok and Wiyot kinship terms". Journal de la Société des Américanistes. 14 (1): 36–74. doi:10.3406/jsa.1922.3991. hdl:1974/11913. ISSN 0037-9174.
- Schoolcraft, Henry Rowe (1839). Algic researches, comprising inquiries respecting the mental characteristics of the North American Indians. First series. Indian tales and legends. Vol. 1. New York: Harper & Brothers. OCLC 6836253. OL 17492450M.
