= Sumeg =

Sumeg may refer to:

- Sümeg, Hungary
- Sumeg, alternate name of Shumig, California
