= Shregegon, California =

Shregegon Sregon (Yurok)
- Former Settlement
- Location in California
- Coordinates: 41°20′04″N 123°51′19″W
- Country: United States
- State: California
- County: Humboldt
- Elevation: 125 ft (38 m)

Shregegon (Note: also Sca-goines, Schre-gon, Ser-a-goines, Seragoins, Serragoin, Sira-grins, and Sri-gon) (Yurok: Sregon) is a former Yurok settlement in Humboldt County, California, United States. It was located approximately 1 mile (1.6 km) above the mouth of Pecwan Creek, at an elevation of 125 feet (38 m).
