= Proto-Algic language =

Reconstructed ancestor of the Algic languages

Proto-Algic
- PAc
- Reconstruction of: Algic languages
- Region: Columbia Plateau?
- Era: ca. 5000 BCE
- Lower-order reconstructions: Proto-Algonquian

Proto-Algic (sometimes abbreviated PAc) is the proto-language from which the Algic languages (Wiyot language, Yurok language, and Proto-Algonquian) are descended. It is estimated to have been spoken about 7,000 years ago somewhere in the American Northwest, possibly around the Columbia Plateau. It is an example of a second-level proto-language (a proto-language whose reconstruction depends on data from another proto-language, namely its descendant language Proto-Algonquian) which is widely agreed to have existed. Its main researcher was Paul Proulx.

== Vowels ==
Proto-Algic had four basic vowels, which could be either long or short:

	Front		Central		Back	
	short	long	short	long	short	long
Close	*i	*i·				
Mid	*e	*e·			*o	*o·
Open			*a	*a·		

== Consonants ==
Proto-Algic is reconstructed with the following consonants:

		Labial	Alveolar			Palatal (-alveolar)	Velar		Glottal
		Labial	plain	lateral	sib./rho.	Palatal (-alveolar)	plain	labial	Glottal
Plosive/ Affricate	tenuis	*p	*t		*c	*č	*k	*kʷ	*ʔ
Plosive/ Affricate	aspirated	*pʰ	*tʰ		*cʰ	*čʰ	*kʰ	*kʷʰ	
Plosive/ Affricate	ejective	*pʼ	*tʼ		*cʼ	*čʼ	*kʼ	*kʷʼ	
Fricative			*θ or *ɬ		*s	*š			*h
Sonorant	plain	*m	*n	*l	*r	*y		*w	
Sonorant	glottalic	*mʼ	*nʼ	*lʼ	*rʼ	*yʼ		*wʼ	

- The identity of the non-sibilant alveolar fricative is not entirely certain; it has been reconstructed as either median or lateral.

It is unknown if *č was an independent phoneme or only an allophone of *c and/or *t in Proto-Algic (as in Proto-Algonquian). In 1992, Paul Proulx theorized that Proto-Algic also possessed a phoneme *gʷ, which became *w in Proto-Algonquian and g in Wiyot and Yurok.

All plosives and affricates in the above chart have aspirated counterparts, and all consonants, except fricatives, have glottalized ones. Proto-Algonquian significantly reduced this system by eliminating all glottalized and aspirated phonemes.

== See also ==
- Algic languages
- Algonquian languages
- Proto-Algonquian language
