= Paul Proulx =

American-Canadian linguist

- Born: 21 November 1942; Biddeford, Maine, U.S.
- Died: 5 December 2005 (aged 63)
- Education: B.A. in Spanish from Amherst College, Master's degree in Linguistics from Cornell University, Ph.D. in Linguistics from Cornell University
- Occupations: Linguist, Anthropological Linguist
- Known for: Research on Algonquian and Algic languages

Paul Proulx (21 November 1942 – 5 December 2005) was an American-born Canadian linguist specializing in Algonquian and Algic studies.

== Biography ==
Paul Martin Proulx was born in Maine in 1942 and completed his bachelor's degree at Amherst College with a major in Spanish in 1965. Proulx pursued a master's degree in linguistics at Cornell University in 1967, after which he began studying the Huayla dialect of the Quechua language. During his time researching in Peru, he co-authored Gramática del Quechua de Huaylas, published in Lima with Augusto Escribens in 1970. After returning to North America, he earned a doctorate in linguistics, again at Cornell. He continued to publish many papers throughout his career, focusing on the Algonquian languages and the reconstruction of Proto-Algic. He taught at St. Francis Xavier University and Brandon University, living in Nova Scotia to be near the Mi'kmaq people and their language.

Proulx died on 5 December, 2005, of leukemia.

== Selected works ==
- 1970: Gramática del Quechua del Huaylas (with Antonio Escribens). National University of San Marcos.
- 1977: "Connective Vowels in Proto-Algonquian." International Journal of American Linguistics, vol. 43.
- 1978: Micmac Inflection (Ph.D. thesis). Cornell University.
- 1980: "The Linguistic Evidence on Algonquian Prehistory." Anthropological Linguistics, vol. 22.
- 1984-1992: "Proto-Algic (I-IV)." International Journal of American Linguistics.
- 1985: "The Semantics of Yurok Terms Referring to Water." Anthropological Linguistics, vol. 27.
- 1988: "Algic Color Terms." Anthropological Linguistics, vol. 30.
- 1989: "A Sketch of Blackfoot Historical Phonology." International Journal of American Linguistics, vol. 55.
- 2003: "The Evidence on Algonquian Genetic Grouping: A Matter of Relative Chronology." International Journal of American Linguistics, vol. 45.
- 2005: "Reduplication in Proto‐Algonquian and Proto‐Central‐Algonquian." International Journal of American Linguistics, vol. 71.
