= Shumig, California =

Shumig Suemeg (Yurok)
- Former settlement
- Location in California
- Coordinates: 41°08′07″N 124°09′09″W
- Country: United States
- State: California
- County: Humboldt
- Elevation: 236 ft (72 m)

Shumig (also, Sumeg, Yurok: Suemeg) is a former Yurok settlement in Humboldt County, California, United States. It was located at Patrick's Point, at an elevation of 236 feet (72 m).
