= Archie Thompson (Yurok) =

American linguist

Archie Thompson (May 26, 1919 – March 26, 2013) was an American Yurok elder. The Yurok are the largest Native American tribe in the U.S. state of California, with approximately 6,000 members.

Thompson was the oldest living Yurok and the last known native-born, active speaker of the Yurok language at the time of his death in 2013. He was the last of about twenty Yurok elders who worked to revitalize the Yurok language. He worked with academics and linguists to preserve and revitalize the language among younger Yurok generations throughout the 1990s and 2000s. Those same linguists had originally predicted that Yurok would be extinct by 2010 and Thompson received much of the credit for saving the language. Yurok is now taught in five high schools throughout Humboldt and Del Norte counties in northern California. While the language is still endangered, the effort to preserve Yurok is considered to be the most successful revitalization effort in California.

== Childhood ==
Thompson was born in a smokehouse on May 26, 1919, in Wa'tek Village (now known as Johnsons, California) in Humboldt County. He was sent to a government school in Hoopa, California, when he was five years old, where he was discouraged from speaking Yurok. He returned home when he was eight years old. He was taken in by his grandmother, Rosie Jack Hoppell. Thompson was raised by his grandmother, who only spoke Yurok in her home, and his uncle. His relatives raised him in a traditional Yurok lifestyle. As a child, Thompson trapped ducks to fill feather mattresses, harvested seaweed, fished for eulachon and salmon, and tracked elk.

== Education and military service ==
Thompson earned varsity letters in football, basketball, baseball and track at Del Norte High School in Crescent City, California, from which he graduated in 1939. Thompson was one of the first Native American students to have his name engraved on the Del Norte H.S. Coach's Cup, a school award which honors exceptional skills in multiple athletic sports. He attended the Sherman Institute, a Native American boarding school in Riverside, California, (now known as Sherman Indian High School) where he learned welding. He served in the United States Navy during World War II and was sent to the South Pacific.

== Personal life ==
Thompson and his wife, Alta McCash, a member of the Karuk people, moved to Crescent City in 1959. The couple had eight children before Alta died from complications of a fall in 1968.

== Honors ==
In 2009, Thompson was awarded the Silver Honor in the Mentor Category from the MetLife Foundation and the National Association of Area Agencies on Aging at a ceremony held in Washington, D.C.

== Death and legacy ==
Archie Thompson died at a hospital in Crescent City on March 26, 2013, at the age of 93. He was survived by eight children, twenty-nine grandchildren, seventy-two great-grandchildren, four great-great-grandchildren, and one sister.
