= Truman Michelson =

American linguist and anthropologist

- Born: August 11, 1879; New Rochelle, New York, United States
- Died: July 26, 1938 (aged 58); Washington, District of Columbia
- Education: Harvard University, University of Leipzig, University of Bonn,
- Occupations: Linguist, Field ethnologist
- Employer(s): Bureau of American Ethnology, Smithsonian Institution, George Washington University
- Spouse: Catharine Trowbridge Harrison

Truman Michelson (August 11, 1879 – July 26, 1938) was a linguist and anthropologist who worked from 1910 until his death for the Bureau of American Ethnology at the Smithsonian Institution. He also held a position as ethnologist at George Washington University from 1917 until 1932.

Michelson, Truman; 18 Oct 1904; #1409; New Rochelle; 25; Prot Episc; Prof Univ Chicago; 1902 AB 1903 AM (Sanskrit) 1904 Ph.D. (philol) Harvard; philol (Sanskrit). Smithsonian Inst Ethnologist, Bur of Amer Ethnology, 1917-? Prof Ethnology George Washington. married Katherine Harrison July 1903. HUG 300. Quinquennial, 420, 682, 683.

Michelson studied Indo-European historical linguistics at Harvard University, completing his doctoral degree in 1904, with further study at the Universities of Leipzig (Note: The entry recorded from the Leipzig University enrollment records reads: "Name: > Michelson, Truman; date of enrollment: 18 Oct 1904; # registration number: #1409; place of birth: New Rochelle; birthdates or age upon enrollment: 25; religion: Prot Episc.; father’s profession: Prof Univ Chicago; education: 1902 AB 1903 AM (Sanskrit) 1904 Ph.D. (philol) Harvard; field of studies: philol (Sanskrit). Smithsonian Inst Ethnologist, Bur of Amer Ethnology, 1917-? Prof Ethnology George Washington. married Katherine Harrison July 1903. HUG 300. Quinquennial, 420, 682, 683.") He also studied in Berlin for one semester under Franz Nikolaus Finck. and Bonn in 1904–1905, followed by study with Franz Boas.

Soon after joining the Bureau of American Ethnology, Michelson began an extensive program of field research on North American Indian languages. Much of Michelson's research focused on languages of the Algonquian family. Bibliographies of his publications are available in Boas (1938), Cooper (1939), and Pentland and Wolfart (1982). He was the author of an early influential study classifying the Algonquian languages, although extensive further research has entirely superseded Michelson's pioneering effort.

Much of his research focused on the Fox people and language, resulting in an extensive list of publications on Fox ethnology and linguistics. Michelson employed native speakers of the language to write Fox stories in the Fox version of the Great Lakes Algonquian syllabary, resulting in a large collection of unpublished materials. Goddard (1991, 1996) discusses the material in some of these texts. A significant text from this corpus, The Owl Sacred Pack, has recently been published. One of the texts obtained in this manner that Michelson did publish, The autobiography of a Fox Indian woman, is now available in a more complete edition, with a revised transcription of the original text and comprehensive linguistic analysis.

Michelson also assisted in the posthumous preparation and publication of a number of draft manuscripts left unpublished after the premature death of William Jones. Among these were: (a) a significant two-volume collection of Ojibwe texts with translations that Jones had obtained in northwestern Ontario at Fort William Ojibwa reserve, and near Lake Nipigon, in addition to stories collected in northern Minnesota; (b) a volume of Kickapoo texts; and (c) an article on Fox for the first Handbook of American Indian languages.

He also undertook field research on, among others, Arapaho; Shawnee; Peoria; Kickapoo; Munsee and Unami, the two closely related Delaware languages; collected notes and texts in the syllabic script from Cree dialects in Québec and northern Ontario; physical anthropology notes on Blackfoot and Cheyenne; Eskimo texts from Great Whale River, Québec, and others. A comprehensive list of all of Michelson's archival materials in the National Anthropological Archives at the Smithsonian Institution is available online.

Michelson was involved in a prominent debate with Edward Sapir because of his rejection of Sapir's proposal that the Algonquian languages were related to Wiyot and Yurok, two languages of California, through common membership in the Algic language family. Although he strongly criticized Sapir's proposal, the historical links between Algonquian, Yurok, and Wiyot are now accepted as being beyond dispute.

== Bibliography ==
- Boas, Franz. 1938. “Truman Michelson.” International Journal of American Linguistics 9(2/4): 113–116.
- Cooper, John M. 1939. “Truman Michelson.” American Anthropologist New Series 41(2): 281–285.
- Goddard, Ives. 1975. “Algonquian, Wiyot and Yurok: Proving a distant genetic relationship.” Eds. M. Dale Kinkade, Kenneth L. Hale, and Oswald Werner, Linguistics and anthropology: In honor of C. F. Voegelin, pp. 249–262. Lisse: Peter de Ridder Press.
- Goddard, Ives. 1979. “Comparative Algonquian.” Lyle Campbell and Marianne Mithun, eds, The languages of Native America, pp. 70–132. Austin: University of Texas Press.
- Goddard, Ives, 1979a. Delaware verbal morphology. New York: Garland.
- Goddard, Ives. 1990. “Some literary devices in the writings of Alfred Kiyana.” W. Cowan, ed., Papers of the twenty-first Algonquian Conference, pp. 159–171. Ottawa: Carleton University.
- Goddard, Ives. 1996. “Writing and reading Mesquakie (Fox).” W. Cowan, ed., Papers of the twenty-seventh Algonquian Conference, pp. 117–134. Ottawa: Carleton University.
- Goddard, Ives. 2006. The autobiography of a Fox woman: A new edition and translation. Edited and translated by Ives Goddard. University of Manitoba: Algonquian and Iroquoian Linguistics.
- Goddard, Ives. 2007. The Owl Sacred Pack: A New Edition and Translation of the Meskwaki Manuscript of Alfred Kiyana. Edited and translated by Ives Goddard. University of Manitoba: Algonquian and Iroquoian Linguistics.
- Jones, William. 1911. “Algonquian (Fox).” Ed. Truman Michelson. Franz Boas, ed., Handbook of American Indian languages 1, pp. 735–873.
- Jones, William. 1917, 1919. Ojibwa texts. Ed. Truman Michelson. Leiden: American Ethnological Society Publications 7.1 (Vol. 1, 1917); New York: G. Stechert (Vol. 2, 1919).
- Jones, William and Truman Michelson. 1917. Kickapoo tales. Truman Michelson, translator. Leiden / New York: American Ethnological Society Publications 9.
- Michelson, Truman. 1912. “Preliminary report of the linguistic classification of Algonquian tribes.” Bureau of American Ethnology Annual Report 28; 221–290b.
- Michelson, Truman. 1914. “Two alleged Algonquian languages of California.” American Anthropologist New Series 16: 261–267.
- Michelson, Truman. 1915. “Rejoinder.” American Anthropologist 16: 361–367.
- Michelson, Truman. 1925. “The autobiography of a Fox Indian woman.” Bureau of American Ethnology Annual Report 40: 291–349.
- Pentland, David and H. Christoph Wolfart. 1982. Bibliography of Algonquian linguistics. Winnipeg: University of Manitoba Press.
- Sapir, Edward. 1913. “Wiyot and Yurok, Algonkian languages of California.” American Anthropologist 15: 617–646.
- Sapir, Edward. 1915. “Algonkian languages of California: a reply.” American Anthropologist 17: 188–194.
- Sapir, Edward. 1915a. “Epilogue.” American Anthropologist 17: 198.
- Smithsonian Institution Archival Listing of Truman Michelson Materials
