= Wiyot language =

Extinct Algic language of California

Wiyot
- Wishosk
- Soulatluk
- Native to: United States
- Region: Northwestern California
- Ethnicity: Wiyot
- Extinct: 1962, with the death of Della Prince
- Revival: late 2019
- Language family: Algic: Wiyot
- Dialects: Patawat; Wiki; Wiyat

Language codes
- ISO 639-3: wiy
- Glottolog: wiyo1248
- ELP: Wiyot
- Map of Wiyot dialects and villages

- Wiyot is classified as Extinct by the UNESCO Atlas of the World's Languages in Danger.

Wiyot (also Wishosk) or Soulatluk (lit. 'your jaw') is an Algic language spoken by the Wiyot people of Humboldt Bay, California. The language's last native speaker, Della Prince, died in 1962.

== Classification ==
Wiyot, along with its geographical neighbor, the Yurok language, were first identified as relatives of the Algonquian languages by Edward Sapir in 1913, though this classification was disputed for decades in what came to be known as the Ritwan controversy. Due to the enormous geographical separation of Wiyot and Yurok from all other Algonquian languages, the validity of their genetic link was hotly contested by leading Americanist linguists; as Ives Goddard put it, the issue "has profound implications for the prehistory of North America". However, by the 1950s, the genetic relationship between the Algonquian languages and Wiyot and Yurok had been established to the satisfaction of most, if not all, researchers, giving rise to the term Algic to refer to the Algonquian languages together with Wiyot and Yurok.

== Revival ==
The Wiyot tribal government is fostering a revival of the language through videos, online dictionaries, and an annual Wiyot language calendar.

With the death of Della Prince in 1962, Wiyot became an extinct language. However, in recent years, the federally recognized Wiyot tribe has a revitalization program. The tribe advertises language courses on its website and publishes Wiyot texts for distribution, such as a calendar.

== Phonology ==
=== Consonants ===
Karl V. Teeter published the first modern descriptive grammar of Wiyot in 1964. His data, supplied by Della Prince shortly before her death, was crucial in establishing the genetic relationship between Algonquin and Wiyot, and effectively ended the scholarly conflict surrounding the issue. All of the linguistic data below comes from his work, published by the University of California Press.

The consonants of Wiyot, as recorded by Teeter, are given in this chart. A cell containing a phoneme will contain, from left to right, Teeter's Practical Orthography, the Wiyot Tribe's orthography, and their IPA equivalents in brackets. Teeter's orthography and the Wiyot Tribe's orthography are separated by a slash, and only one grapheme is listed without a slash where both orthographies use the same grapheme. Teeter's orthography is used in this article for examples.

| | | Bilabial | Alveolar | | Postalveolar or palatal | Velar | | Glottal |
| | | Bilabial | median | lateral | Postalveolar or palatal | plain | labialized | Glottal |
|---|---|---|---|---|---|---|---|---|
| Plosive | voiceless | p / b [p] | t / d [t] | | | k / g [k] | kw / q [kʷ] | h / ' [ʔ] |
| Plosive | aspirated | ph / p [pʰ] | th / t [tʰ] | | | kh / k [kʰ] | kwh / qh [kʷʰ] | |
| Affricate | voiceless | | c / ts [ts] | | č / j [tʃ] | | | |
| Affricate | aspirated | | ch / tsh [tsʰ] | | čh / ch [tʃʰ] | | | |
| Fricative | | | s [s] | ł / lh [ɬ] | š / sh [ʃ] | | | h [h] |
| Nasal | | m [m] | n [n] | | | | | |
| Flap | | | d / rr [ɾ] | | | | | |
| Approximant | | b / v [β] | r [ɹ] | l [l] | y [j] | g / gh [ɣ] | w [w] | |

- In Teeter's orthography, the grapheme ⟨h⟩ is used for the fricative [h] word-initially and for the stop [ʔ] otherwise.

=== Vowels ===
| | Front | Central | Back |
|---|---|---|---|
| High | i [i] | | u / ou [u] |
| Low | e [e] | a / u [a] | o / a [ɑ] |

=== Syllables ===
Wiyot syllables always begin with consonants or consonant clusters, which are followed by a vowel. This vowel may be long or short. If the vowel is short, the syllable must end in the same consonant that begins the next syllable. Therefore, all non-final syllables are heavy, acquiring either a CVV or CVC structure. Word final syllables may or may not be heavy.

These syllable-final consonants are lengthened in speech, but do not appear as doubled letters in transcription. For example, in the word palógih, meaning 'flounder', the 'l' is lengthened. Thus, the first syllable ends with 'l', and the second begins with 'l', and both syllables are considered heavy.

Teeter describes the "weight" of Wiyot syllables as one of the language's most salient features for speakers of English. He adds that voiced sounds tend to be exceptionally long in spoken Wiyot, a feature that adds to the perceived phonological heaviness of the language.

=== Pitch accent ===
In speech, Wiyot words are grouped into pitch accent phrases, which are separated by commas when written. Within these phrases, regular patterns of syllable stress and vowel length emerge. Stress, pitch and vowel length increase gradually from the beginning of the accent phrase until the culminative syllable in the accent phrase is reached, after which pitch precipitously drops, except when it is the final syllable of the accent phrase. In such a situation, the accent phrase would end on a high pitch.

The vowel of the culminative syllable bears either an acute or grave accent, the latter indicating a high pitch, and the former a high pitch which rapidly falls. The grave accent appears only when the culminative syllable is the final syllable of a breath group, which are groups of accent phrases.

The ends of breath groups are marked by periods, and are notably lower in relative pitch. Accent phrases towards the end of a breath group follow the same pattern of gradual lengthening and pitch increase, though the relative pitch is lower with respect to the preceding accent phrases. Breath groups end with a general weakening of articulatory force, which is followed by a noticeable interval of silence.

Despite the intricacies of pitch involved in Wiyot, the total pitch range of the spoken language is only a fraction of that of English, for example.

==== Example ====
kowa baktéthohlabił, búl, kiš dókwahl, ku lulawá, kud kuhwil. łekoku lulawìl.
'She began to throw aside the boards of the house, thinking in vain, 'I'll take that man back.' She never took him back.'

This fragment of Wiyot narration consists of two breath groups: the first contains five accent phrases, the second contains just one. The first accent phrase of the first breath group, kowa baktéthohlabił, carries the stress on the fourth syllable. The vowel of this 'culminative syllable', an 'e', carries an acute accent and is pronounced at a higher pitch than any other in the phrase. It is also lengthened relative to the other vowels in the phrase. After this culminative syllable, pitch and length decrease rapidly through the end of the accent phrase.

The second breath group contains just one accent phrase, łekoku lulawìl. Here, the culminative syllable comes at the end of the accent phrase, indicating that pitch and length increase through the phrase until the final vowel, which starts on a high pitch that rapidly falls. This articulation is indicated with a grave accent over the 'i'. These accents only appears when the culminative syllable is the last syllable of a breath group, as in this example.

=== Processes ===
Teeter recorded many morphonemic processes that Wiyot words and phrases undergo. A few are listed below.

Aspirated stops, such as [pʰ] and [kʰ], undergo deaspiration when in word-final position. Thus, in the word hutóphahl, tóph, meaning 'spruce root' is aspirated, [tɑpʰ]; when the same morpheme appears in isolation, though, it is articulated without the final aspiration, [tɑp].

When any element ending in /o/ is followed by another element beginning in /b/ or /w/, /la/ is inserted. In the example kado-la-wal-áh, 'I don't see it', la follows the negating element kado, and itself conveys no meaning.

When any two vowels, or any three consonants that cannot occur as a phonological cluster, are combined due to morphological construction, the general tendency is for the second element to be eliminated. This is not true in the case of a laryngeal combining with a consonant cluster, in that order. In such a situation, the initial laryngeal element is eliminated.

== Morphology ==
Wiyot is a highly synthetic, agglutinative language. Words or, more specifically, accent phrases, are formed by joining stems and affixes. Wiyot employs both prefixation and suffixation, meaning that affixes appear both before and after stems. Both verb and noun forms are constructed this way, though the particulars of each system are different.

=== Stems ===
Stems are non-affixal morphemes, and can appear individually or as compounds. For example, thig-, meaning 'out', can appear as the only stem of a given word, or be joined to another stem, such as -atol, 'go'. Their compound, thigatol-, 'go out', is also a stem.

Stems are either initial or medial. Initial stems may appear, as their name implies, as the first or only stems in a given word. Most stems belong to this class. thig-, for example, is the initial stem in the above-mentioned compound thigatol-. All initial stems start with a consonant.

Medial stems may not appear as the initial or sole stem in a word, and therefore must be combined with an initial. Medials, such as -atol, always begin with a vowel. Medial stems may also occur as the second member of a compound with a special initial l-. This compound has essentially the same meaning as the medial itself. For example, the medial -athohl, meaning 'throw' or 'jump', can appear with an initial 'l-' as lathohl-, meaning 'throw'.

=== Affixes ===
Wiyot affixes are classified as either derivational, inflectional or syntactic.

Derivational affixes are attached to stems and serve to classify them. Together, stems and derivational affixes form 'themes', which can be further modified by inflectional and syntactic affixes. The stem rakh-, meaning 'laugh', may take the derivational affix -ohw and become rakhohw-, or 'laugh at'. Thus, -ohw serves to create an impersonal transitive verb theme with rakh- as the stem. There are many derivational affixes, most of which correspond to a complicated set of rules: stems can belong to one of eleven categories that determines which set of derivational affixes it may take. Therefore, to form an impersonal transitive verb theme like rakhohw, for example, there are 10 other possible affixes that occur with stems from other categories. Furthermore, certain derivational affixes occur only when affixed to specific stems.

Inflectional affixes encode the subject and object of the theme. Wiyot makes a sharp distinction between definite and indefinite subjects, and each of these classes has its own set of inflectional affixes. Certain classes of Wiyot verbs can also take benefactive and instrumental affixes. The benefactive characterizes the verb as being done to a third person object for the benefit of a second object. Instrumental affixes convey that action is performed using a device of some kind. Instrumental and benefactive affixes directly encode for the subject of the verb and thus do not appear with inflectional affixes for subject. Therefore, the most inflectional affixes a verb can possibly take is three. Inflectional affixes can be either terminal or nonterminal in nature. Terminal affixes, when added to verb or noun themes, can complete words, while nonterminal affixes require additional affixation. The noun form rakhóhwalił, meaning 'he/she laughs at me', contains two inflectional affixes that modify the verb form rakhohw- shown above: -al is the nonterminal suffix that encodes a first person object, and -ił is the terminal suffix for a third person subject.

Syntactic affixes, many of which are prefixes, also known as preverbs, are affixed to verb themes and often convey aspectual information. For example, in the phrase łekowa khúhnad, meaning 'finally it starts to get dark', the verb theme khuhn-, 'to get dark', is modified by two syntactic suffixes, łe- and kowa-. łe- means 'finally', and kowa- marks the inchoative aspect, translated here as 'it starts'. khuhn- is also inflected for the third person subject by the inflectional terminal suffix -ad. Verbs form can take up to four preverbs, which appear in a fixed order according to their syntactic class. There are nine classes in total, with the lower numbers appearing earlier in the verb form.

Some examples of preverbs include:

Class I: ła, the cessative aspect. ła kítapaluy 'They just got through eating'
Class II: bu, the perfect tense. bu tikwátolił 'He had come down.'
Class VI: ki, the emphatic negative. ki bołùy 'They never eat.'

The position numbers fix the relative positions of these preverbs when they appear in combination. Thus, to create a perfect cessative construction using the inflected verb theme tikwátolił, ła would have to precede bu to form łabu tikwátolił, 'He had just come down'.

Preverbs, in addition to aspect, often convey tense and mood.

=== Derivation ===
Wiyot nouns are often derived from verbs, and typically serve to fill out and expound upon the various relationships and categories already expressed in verb forms. Like verbs, nouns consist of stems and affixes.

Nominalization is the most important process in Wiyot for deriving nouns. Typically, nouns are created from verbs by adding one of twelve nominalizing affixes to the verb complex. The most common nominalizing suffix is ił, and there are many examples of nominalized forms that employ it. (ił is also the most common third person inflectional suffix in Wiyot, and both the nominalizing and inflectional suffixes appear in the same position. This gives rise to some degree of morphological ambiguity in many cases.)

bacawáłiksił is a nominalized form meaning 'swan'; it is derived from the homonymous verb meaning 'he makes it dry'.

bacigadarawił means 'robin', and is derived from the homonymous verb meaning 'he is dry on the eyes'.

A less ambiguous, more obviously derived example employs the nominalizing suffix ihla: táthotawihla, meaning 'football', is the nominalized form of the verb meaning 'it goes with a kicking motion'.

=== Inflection ===
Nouns are inflected for four categories: the subordinative, possessive, locative and vocative.

Subordinative inflection, indicated by a suffix added to a noun theme, expresses that the inflected noun belongs to another nominal concept- a person, perhaps. Nouns can also be subordinated to an indefinite nominal concept using the suffix -ik. The definite subordinative suffixes are -ahl, -ihl and ohl. An example of a definite subordinate inflection is the noun form waptáhl, meaning 'his teeth', which consists of the subordinate noun theme wapt- and the inflectional suffix -ahl.

Possessive inflection is conveyed using prefixes. There are three different sets of possessive prefixes, though the majority of Wiyot nouns are inflected using only one of these. This most productive set distinguishes three persons: first- duh; second- khuh; third- huh. The final h seen in these stems is often dropped in spoken Wiyot. khuhlóš, meaning 'your strawberries', includes the second person pronoun from this first set, khuh-.

The second set applies only to inalienable nouns, or nouns that must be possessed, such as body parts. Curiously, the words for 'wood' and 'enemy' belong in this category of Wiyot nouns, as well. The set only distinguishes two persons: first- d-; second- kh-. Third person possession of inalienable nouns tends to be conveyed using a subordinative derivational suffix. Pronouns from this second set tend to replace the initial consonants of the themes they are affixed to. Thus, in the noun form khápt, meaning 'your teeth', the second person possessive prefix for inalienable nouns kh- replaces the initial consonant of wapt, 'teeth'. Within the second set, there is also an indefinite or absolutive prefix b.

The third set is limited largely to kinship terms and the word for 'nose'. In the third set, the second person possessive is articulated by aspirating the initial phoneme of the noun theme. Thus, čul, meaning 'maternal aunt', becomes čhul [čʰul], 'your maternal aunt'. There is no marking of a first person possessive in this category, and, as in the second set, a third person possessive is indicated by the use of a subordinative derivational suffix.

Locative inflection is indicated by one of two affixes: the suffix -okw and the prefix ho-. Both have general meanings which can be translated as 'at, on, near, above, over, under, behind, etc.'. -okw is employed with the great majority of Wiyot nouns, as in kwásokw, meaning 'on the hill', and bíhwadawawokw, 'in the smoke'. ho- is used with the inalienable nouns and kinship terms mentioned above. 'On your teeth' is expressed hola wáptihyam (-la appears after all prefixes that are followed by b or w).

There is a single vocative prefix, ho-, that occurs with kinship terms. It appears affixed to ko, meaning 'mother', in the form hóko.

=== Pronouns ===
Wiyot personal pronouns are generally used to emphasize the subjects or objects indicated in verb forms. The personal pronouns distinguish three persons, each with a singular and plural variant. Thus, this set of pronouns is frequently used to clarify number in verb forms, as Wiyot verbs themselves do not. The first person plural pronoun hinód, for example, is often employed alongside verb complexes that are inflected for the indefinite third person or impersonal, such as in the example hi walúy, hinód, meaning 'we saw'. Here, walúy is inflected for an indefinite third person, though hinód unambiguously expresses 'we'.

| | Singular | Plural |
|---|---|---|
| 1st person | yil, yi | hinód |
| 2nd person | khil | khil wow |
| 3rd person | kwilahl | kwilawotil tokwun |

== Syntax ==
Verbs are the core of Wiyot grammar, and verbal phrases are the most important part of Wiyot sentences. Verb complexes — inflected verb themes combined with syntactic affixes — form sentences along with nominal phrases. Verb phrases themselves frequently encode subject, object, and instrumental information, but the actual entities being signified are rarely named. Noun and pronoun phrases serve to provide this information. The transitivity of the verb complex determines the classes of noun forms that may occur in the sentence; nominal phrases serve to specify subject and object information, so intransitive verbs, which lack inflection for object, would not appear in combination with a nominal phrase for the object.

Preverb sequences, which consist of up to four syntactic prefixes, are the first step in expanding the derived and inflected verbal form. A great deal of morphological information can be conveyed in this prefixed element: aspect, mode, and tense are all commonly expressed using preverbs, as is quantitative information and polarity.

Nominal forms round out and complete Wiyot sentences, frequently serving as adjuncts to verbal phrases. Nouns are categorized as either principal or modifying phrases. Principal phrases include nominalized forms and possessive phrases, while modifying phrases typically refer to a time or place in which a verbal phrase occurs. For example, dótok is a principal nominal form meaning "large, longish object"; kíłi is a modifying nominal form meaning "right now".

Pronominal phrases further elucidate verbal complexes and can be employed as noun forms themselves. hinód, for example, can take the nominalizing affix -ał and be treated as a nominal phrase.

These elements are combined relatively freely to form sentences; the limited corpus of Wiyot text indicates a wide variety of syntactic organizations. Most Wiyot sentences are in the indicative mood, as are all of the examples given below.

kwháli yał, koto walùy. Literally translated, the sentence means "but they don't see it here", though the verb form is here employed idiomatically to mean "grow", giving a translation of "but it doesn't grow here". kwháli yał is a modifying nominal phrase, translated in this example as "here"; kwháli means "here" and yał is an adversative postposition translated as "but". koto walùy is the verbal phrase: ko is the negative preverb, from position class IV, and to is an articular preverb, while walùy is the verb "see" inflected for the indefinite third person.

kwołto ku tikwó, bocókwotwił. "That white man is surprised about something". kwołto is a nominal phrase meaning "something"; it serves as the object of the sentence. ku tikwó is also a nominal phrase and serves to clarify the subject of the verbal phrase. ku is a demonstrative article meaning "that"; tikwó means "white man". Finally, bocókwotwił is a verb, "to be surprised", inflected for the definite third person.

== Bibliography ==
- Campbell, Lyle (1997). American Indian languages: The historical linguistics of Native America. New York: Oxford University Press.
- Dixon, Roland; Kroeber, Alfred L. (1913). "New linguistic families in California". American Anthropologist. 5: 1–26. doi:10.1525/aa.1903.5.1.02a00020. hdl:2027/uc1.31158008344169.
- Elsasser, Albert B. (1978). "Wiyot". In Heizer, R. F. (ed.). Handbook of North American Indians. Vol. 8: California. Washington, DC: Smithsonian Institution. pp. 153–163.
- Goddard, Ives (1975). "Algonquian, Wiyot, and Yurok: Proving a distant genetic relationship". In Kinkade, M. D.; Hale, K. L.; Werner, O. (eds.). Linguistics and anthropology in honor of C. F. Voegelin. Lisse: Peter de Ridder Press. pp. 249–262.
- Goddard, Ives (1979). "Comparative Algonquian". In Campbell, L.; Mithun, M. (eds.). The languages of native America: Historical and comparative assessment. Austin: University of Texas Press. pp. 70–132.
- Goddard, Ives (1990). "Algonquian linguistic change and reconstruction". In Baldi, P. (ed.). Linguistic change and reconstruction methodology. Berlin: Mouton de Gruyter. pp. 99–114.
- Golla, Victor (2011). California Indian Languages. Berkeley: University of California Press. ISBN 978-0-520-26667-4.
- Haas, Mary R. (1958). "Algonkian-Ritwan: The end of a controversy". International Journal of American Linguistics. 24 (3): 159–173. doi:10.1086/464453.
- Kroeber, Alfred L. "The Languages of the Coast of California North of San Francisco". University of California Publications in American Archaeology and Ethnology. 9 (3): 384–404.
- Loud, Llewellyn L (1918). "Ethnography and archaeology of the Wiyot territory". University of California Publications in American Archaeology and Ethnology. 14–15: 221–436.
- Michelson, Truman (1914). "Two alleged Algonquian languages of California". American Anthropologist. 16 (2): 361–367. doi:10.1525/aa.1914.16.2.02a00150.
- Michelson, Truman (1915). "Rejoinder (to Edward Sapir)". American Anthropologist. 17: 4–8.
- Mithun, Marianne (1999). The languages of Native North America. Cambridge: Cambridge University Press. ISBN 0-521-23228-7.
- Reichard, Gladys (1925). Wiyot grammar and texts. Berkeley: University of California Press.
- Sapir, Edward (1913). "Wiyot and Yurok, Algonkin languages of California". American Anthropologist. 15 (4): 617–646. doi:10.1525/aa.1913.15.4.02a00040.
- Sapir, Edward (1915a). "Algonkin languages of California: A reply". American Anthropologist. 17: 188–194. doi:10.1525/aa.1915.17.1.02a00270.
- Sapir, Edward (1915b). "Epilogue". American Anthropologist. 17: 198.
- Teeter, Karl V. (1964a). "Algonquian languages and genetic relationship". Proceedings of the ninth international congress of linguists. The Hague: Mouton. pp. 1026–1033.
- Teeter, Karl V. (1964b). The Wiyot language. University of California publications in linguistics. Berkeley: University of California Press.
