= International Journal of American Linguistics =

- Discipline: Linguistics
- Language: English
- Edited by: David Beck, Doris Payne

Publication details
- History: 1917–present
- Publisher: University of Chicago Press (US)
- Frequency: Quarterly
- Impact factor: 0.18 (2012)

Standard abbreviations
- ISO 4: Int. J. Am. Linguist.

Indexing
- ISSN: 0020-7071 (print); 1545-7001 (web)
- JSTOR: intejamerling

Links
- Journal homepage

The International Journal of American Linguistics (IJAL) is an academic journal devoted to the study of the indigenous languages of the Americas. IJAL focuses on the investigation of linguistic data and the presentation of grammatical fragments and other documents relevant to Amerindian languages.

== History ==
The journal was established in 1917 by anthropologist Franz Boas. It has been published by the University of Chicago Press since 1974.
