= Yurok language =

Moribund Algic language of California

Yurok
- Pueleeklaʼ
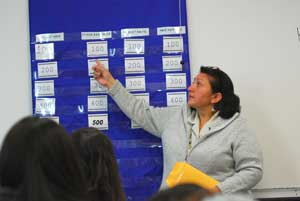
- Instructor teaching Yurok with the Yurok Language Program
- Native to: United States
- Region: Northwestern California
- Ethnicity: Yurok
- Extinct: 2013, with the death of Archie Thompson
- Revival: 1990s - 350 speakers with some knowledge, 35 fluent L2 speakers as of 2020
- Language family: Algic: Yurok
- Writing system: Latin, Unifon (historically)

Language codes
- ISO 639-3: yur
- Glottolog: yuro1248
- ELP: Yurok

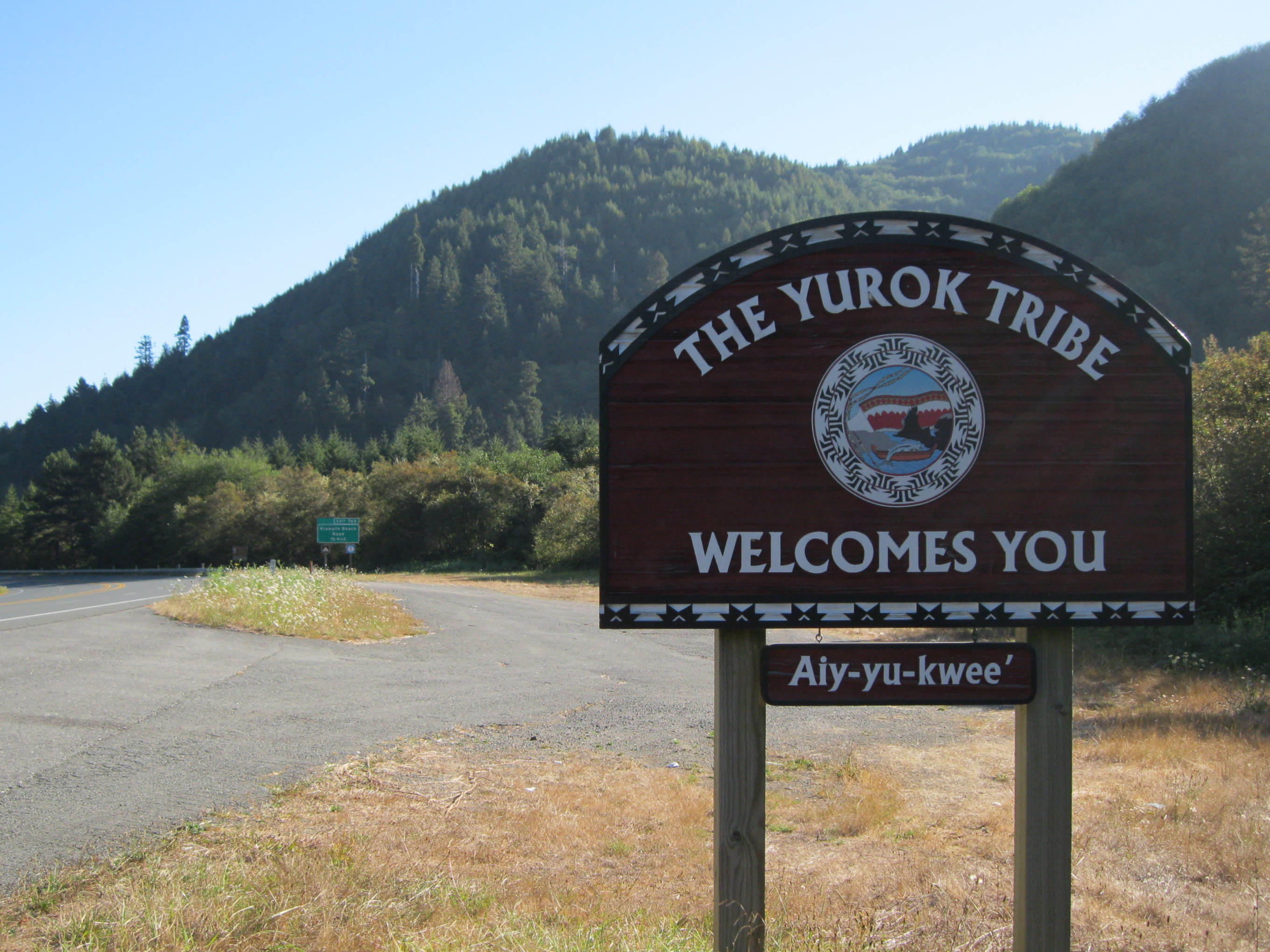
Welcome sign with Yurok greeting, "Aiy-yu-kwee'"

Yurok (also Chillula, Mita, Pekwan, Rikwa, Sugon, Weitspek, Weitspekan) is an Algic language. It is the traditional language of the Yurok people of Del Norte County and Humboldt County on the far north coast of California, most of whom now speak English. The last known native speaker, Archie Thompson, died in 2013. As of 2022, Yurok language classes were taught to high school students, and other revitalization efforts were expected to increase the population of speakers.

The standard reference on the Yurok language grammar is by R. H. Robins (1958).

== Name ==
Concerning the etymology of Yurok, Campbell (1997) states:

Yurok is from Karuk yúruk meaning literally 'downriver'. The Yurok traditional name for themselves is Puliklah (Hinton 1994:157), from pulik 'downstream' + -la 'people of', thus equivalent in meaning to the Karuk name by which they came to be known in English (Victor Golla, personal communication).

— Campbell (1997), p. 401, n. 131–132

== History ==
Decline of the language began during the California Gold Rush, due to the influx of new settlers and the diseases they brought with them and Native American boarding schools initiated by the United States government with the intent of incorporating the native populations of America into mainstream American society increased the rate of decline of the language.

== Status ==
The program to revive Yurok has been lauded as the most successful language revitalization program in California. As of 2014, there are six schools in Northern California that teach Yurok - four high schools and two elementary schools. Rick Jordan, principal of Eureka High School, one of the schools with a Yurok Language Program, remarks on the impact that schools can have on the vitality of a language, "A hundred years ago, it was our organizations that were beating the language out of folks, and now we're trying to re-instill it – a little piece of something that is much larger than us".

The last known native, active speaker of Yurok, Archie Thompson, died March 26, 2013. "He was also the last of about 20 elders who helped revitalize the language over the last few decades, after academics in the 1990s predicted it would be extinct by 2010. He made recordings of the language that were archived by UC Berkeley linguists and the tribe, spent hours helping to teach Yurok in community and school classrooms, and welcomed apprentice speakers to probe his knowledge."

Linguists at UC Berkeley began the Yurok Language Project in 2001. Professor Andrew Garrett and Dr. Juliette Blevins collaborated with tribal elders on a Yurok dictionary that has been hailed as a national model. The Yurok Language Project has gone much more in depth than just a printed lexicon, however. The dictionary is available online and fully searchable. It is also possible to search an audio dictionary – a repository of audio clips of words and short phrases. For a more in-depth study, there is a database of compiled texts where words and phrases can be viewed as part of a larger context.

As of February 2013, there were over 300 basic Yurok speakers, 60 with intermediate skills, 37 who are advanced, and 17 who are considered conversationally fluent. As of 2014, nine people were certified to teach Yurok in schools. Since Yurok, like many other Native American languages, uses a master-apprentice system to train up speakers in the language, having even nine certified teachers would not be possible without a piece of legislation passed in 2009 in the state of California that allows indigenous tribes the power to appoint their own language teachers.

== Phonology ==
=== Vowels ===
Vowels are as follows:

	Front		Central		Back	
	short	long	short	long	short	long
Close	i	iː			u	uː
Mid	e		ɚ	ɚː	ɔ	ɔː
Open			a	aː		

Yurok has an anticipatory vowel harmony system where underlying non-close vowels /a e ɔ/ are realized as [ɚ] if they precede an /ɚ/.

Yurok has front-, central-, and back-closing diphthongs. The second element of the diphthongs is considered a consonant or semivowel. This is because Yurok diphthongs are falling diphthongs and behave similarly to nasal and approximates following a vowel and preceding a pause or voiceless non-glottalized consonant.

=== Consonants ===
Consonants are as follows:

		Bilabial	Alveolar		Retroflex	Palatal	Velar		Glottal
		Bilabial	median	lateral	Retroflex	Palatal	plain	labial	Glottal
Nasal	plain	m	n						
Nasal	glottalic	ˀm	ˀn						
Plosive/ Affricate	tenuis	p	t		tʂ ~ tʃ		k	kʷ	ʔ
Plosive/ Affricate	ejective	pʼ	tʼ		tʂʼ ~ tʃʼ		kʼ	kʷʼ	
Fricative	voiceless			ɬ	ʂ	ʃ	x		h
Fricative	voiced						ɣ ~ ɡ	w ~ ɣʷ	
Approximant	plain		ɹ	l		j		w ~ ɣʷ	
Approximant	glottalic		ˀɹ	ˀl		ˀj		ˀw	

- Notable is the lack of /s/.
- /x/ is rare and only found word-finally.

=== Phonotactics ===
All Yurok syllables begin with a consonant and contain at least one vowel. Here are some examples of the different kinds of syllable structure:

CV	ki	will, can
CVː	hoː	to go
CVC	kuʂ	when? how?
CVːC	kiːɬ	redwood tree
CVCC	mekʷt͜ʃ	snail
CVCCC	taʔanojʔɬ	it is hot (weather)
CVːCC	hoːkʷʼt͜ʃʼ	he gambles
CVːCCC	noːjt͜ʃʼkʷ	he eats as a guest
CCV	t͜ʃpi	only
CCVː	ploːlikin	wide
CCVC	ɬkeɬ	earth
CCVːC	t͜ʃpaːk	late
CCVCC	plaʔʂ	stick for measuring net meshes
CCVːCC	ɬkoːʔm	they take
CCVC	ɬkjoɹkʷekʼ	I look
CCVCCC	t͜ʃkʷaʔɹkʼ	near
CVːVC	ʂoːol	yew
CCVːV	knuːu	hawk

VːV can only be /oːo/ or /uːu/ and is signaled by a change in pitch between the vowels.

== Orthography ==
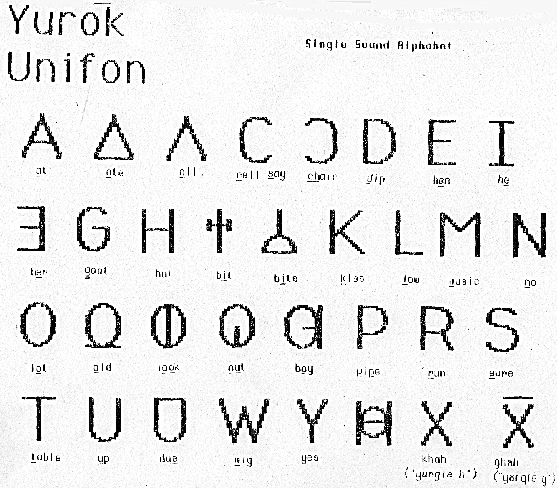
The Unifon alphabet for Yurok

As of 2020, Yurok is written in the New Yurok Alphabet, using Latin characters. Previously, Yurok was written in the Yurok Unifon; some books cited in the Yurok Language Project contain Yurok written in the Unifon script, though due to practicality in writing, typing, and reading, the Latin characters are now preferred. Currently, there is a spelling reform occurring to streamline the spelling of words; thus, some letters may differ between spellings. Currently, this is the alphabet as taught at various schools.

=== New Yurok Alphabet ===
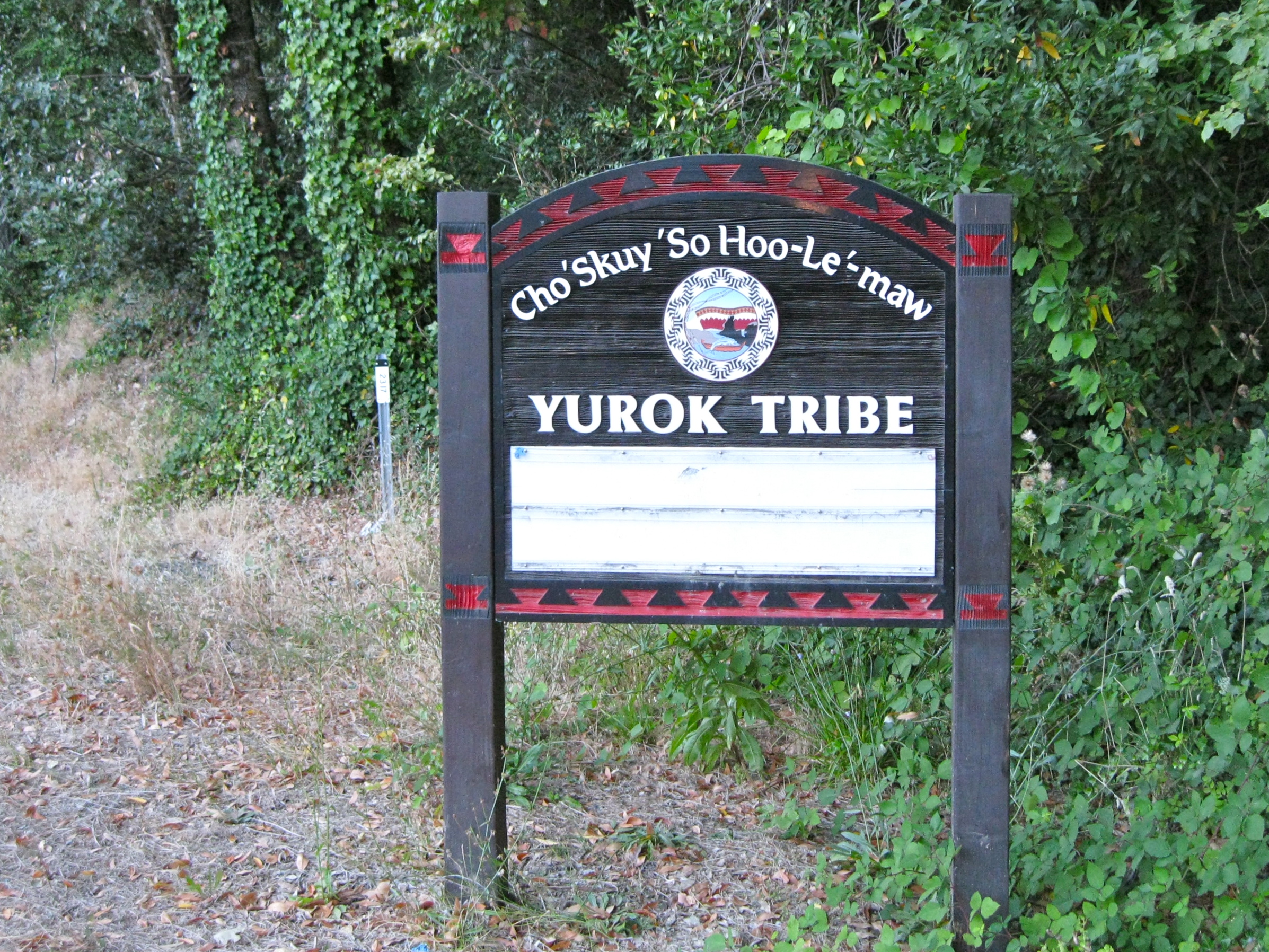
Sign at the tribal headquarters.

- A a /a/ (as in lap-sew /lapʂej/)
- Aa aa /aː/ (as in aa-wok /aːwɔk/)
- Aw aw /aw/ (as in teeʼ-naw /tiːʔnaw/)
- Ay/Aiy ay/aiy /aj/ (as in aiyʼ-ye-kweee /ajʔjekʷiː/. Spelling is currently being reformed.)
- Ch ch /t͡ʃ/ (as in chee-mos /t͡ʃimɔʂ/)
- Chʼ chʼ /t͡ʃʼ/ (as in chʼ-ee-shah /t͡ʃʼiʃah/)
- E e /e/ (as in ne-chek /net͡ʃek/)
- Ee ee /i/ (as in chee-nos /t͡ʃinɔʂ/)
- Eee eee /iː/ (as in cheeek /t͡ʃiːk/)
- Er er /ɚ/ (as in er-plers /ɚplɚʂ/)
- Err err /ɚː/ (as in errhl-ker /ɚːɬkɚ/)
- Ery ery /ɚj/ (as in cherʼ-ery /t͡ʃɚʔɚj/)
- Erw erw /ɚw/ (as in mer-terw /mɚtɚw/)
- Ew ew /ew/ (as in pop-sew /pɔpʂew/)
- Ey ey /ej/ (as in ey-lekw /ejlekʷ/)
- Eyr eyr /ejɹ/ (as in neyr-es /nejɹeʂ/)
- G g /ɣ/ (as in pey-gerk /pejɣɚk/)
- H h /h/ (as in herhl-ker /hɚɬkɚ/)
- Hl hl /ɬ/ (as in hlkehl /ɬkeɬ/)
- K k /k/ (as in neʼ-kue-chos /neʔkut͡ʃɔʂ/)
- Kʼ kʼ /kʼ/ (as in kʼ-ooy /kʼɔːj/)
- Kw kw /kʷ~kʷʼ/ (as in kwerhl /kʷɚɬ/)
- L l /l~ˀl/ (as in lo-chomʼ /lɔt͡ʃɔmʔ/)
- M m /m~ˀm/ (as in mey-wo /mejwɔ/)
- N n /n~ˀn/ (as in neyp-sech /nejpʂet͡ʃ/)
- O o /ɔ/ (as in ohl-kuem /ɔɬkum/)
- Oo oo /ɔː/ (as in oohl /ɔːɬ/)
- Ow /ɔw/ (as in kow-wey /kɔwwej/)
- Owr /ɔwɹ/ (as in mey-wee-mowr /mejwimɔwɹ/)
- Oy oy /ɔj/ (as in koy-poh /kɔjpɔh/)
- P p /p/ (as in ple-tew /pletew/)
- Pʼ pʼ /pʼ/ (as in plopʼ /plɔpʼ/)
- R r /ɹ~ˀɹ/ (as in rekʼ-woy /ɹekʷʼɔj/)
- S s /ʂ/ (as in sa-ʼahl /ʂaʔaɬ/)
- Sh sh /ʃ/ (as in pre-go-neesh /pɹeɣɔniʃ/)
- T t /t/ (as in te-seer /tesɚ/)
- Tʼ tʼ /tʼ/ (as in tʼot-ʼohl /tʼɔtʼoɬ/)
- Ue ue /u/ (as in wo-nue /wɔnu/)
- Uue uue /uː/ (as in chuueʼ /t͡ʃuː/)
- Uy uy /uj/ (as in ne-puy /nepuj/)
- W w /w~ˀw/ (as in wo-news-le-pah /wɔnewʂlepah/)
- X x /x/ (as in ʼwa-ʼa-lox /ʔwaʔalɔx/)
- Y y /j~ˀj/ (as in ye-gom /jeɣɔm/)
- ʼ /ʔ/ (as in chpok-sekʼ /t͡ʃpɔkʂekʔ/)

Some books have been written partially in Yurok. One such example is the graphic novel Soldiers Unknown, written by Chag Lowry. The Yurok text in Soldiers Unknown was translated by Yurok language teacher James Gensaw, and the graphic novel was illustrated by Rahsan Ekedal.

== Morphology ==
Yurok morphological processes include prefixation, infixation, inflection, vowel harmony, ablaut, consonantal alternation, and reduplication.

Prefixation and infixation occur in nominals and verbals, and occasionally in other classes, although infixation occurs most frequently in verbals.

Vowel harmony occurs for prefixes, infixes, and inflections, depending on the vocalic and consonantal structure of the word stem. Internal vocalic alternation involves three alternating pairs: /e/~/i/, /e/~/iʔi/, /e/~/u/.

Reduplication occurs mostly on verb stems but occasionally for nouns and can connote repetition, plurality, etc. Reduplication occurs on the first syllable, and sometimes a part of the second syllable:

Stem		Reduplicated form	
Verbs
kelomen	to turn (trans.)	kekelomen	to turn several things
ketʼul	there is a lake	ketʼketʼul	there is a series of lakes
kneweʔlon	to be long	kokoneweʔlon	to be long (of things)
ɬkɹʔmɹkɬkin	to tie a knot.	ɬkɹʔmɬkɹʔmɹkɹɬkin	to tie up in knots
ʂjaːɬk	to kick	ʂjaʔʂjaːɬk	to kick repeatedly
tekʷʂ	to cut	tekʷtekʷʂ	to cut up
tikʷohʂ	to break (trans.)	tikʷtikʷohʂ	to break in pieces
Nouns
mɹkʷɹɬ	peak	mɹkʷɹmɹkʷɹɬ	series of peaks
ʂlekʷoh	shirt	ʂlekʷʂlekʷ	clothes

== Classifications ==
Numerals and adjectives can be classified according to the noun grammatically associated with them.

Numerals	three (common root frame: /n - hks-/)
Human beings	/nahkseyl/
Animals and birds	/nrhksrʔrʔy/
Round things	/nrhksrʔrʔy/
Tools	/nahksoh/
Plants other than trees	/nahksekʼwoʔn/
Trees and sticks	/nahkseʔr/
Body parts and clothes	/nahkseʔn/
Long things	/nahksekʼ/
Flat things	/nahksokʼs/
Houses	/nahkseʔli/
Boats	/nahksey/
Days	/nahksemoyt/
Arm's lengths (depth measurements)	/nahksemrys/
Finger joint lengths (length measurement of dentalium shells)	/nahksepir/
Times	/nahksemi/

Adjectives	(to be) red	(to be) big
Human beings	/prkaryrʔry(-)/	/peloy-/
Animals and birds	/prkryrʔry(-)/	/plrʔry-/
Round things	/prkryrh/	/ploh/, /plohkeloy-/
Tools	/pekoyoh/	/peloy-/
Plants other than trees	/pekoyoh/	/ploh/, /plohkeloy-/
Trees and sticks	/pekoyeʔr/	/peloy-/, /plep-/
Body parts and clothes	/pekoyoh/	/plep-/, /plohkeloy-/
Long things	/pekoyoh/	/plep-/
Flat things	/pekoyoks-/	/ploks-/
Houses	/pekoyoh/	/pleʔloy-/
Boats	/pekoyoh/	/pleyteloy-/
Water	/pekoyop-/	---

== Tense and aspect ==
As in many indigenous languages of the Americas, Yurok verbs do not code tense through inflection. The time when an action takes place is inferred through both linguistic and nonlinguistic context.

On the other hand, aspect is prevalent in Yurok verbs, being indicated by preverbal particles. These occur either directly or indirectly before a verb. These can combine with verbs and other particles to indicate time and many other aspects.

Some preverbal particles include: ho (completed action in the past); kic (past but with ongoing effects); wo (past after a negative, or in "unreal conditions"); ?ap (past with the implication of starting some action).

== Basic syntax ==
The most common form of sentence structure consists of a Nominal + Verbal. Indeed, most other, seemingly more complex sentence structures can be viewed as expanding on this fundamental type.

nek helomey -ek
I {be dancing} -1sg
"I am dancing."

pu:k roʔopʼ
deer run
"The deer is running."

Sentences can also be equational, consisting of two nominals or nominal groups:

wok ne- let
3SG.PRO SG.POSS- sister
"That is my sister."

woʔot ku tmi:gomin
3SG.PRO ART hunter
"He is the hunter."

Sentences can also be composed of one or more verbals without nominals as explicit arguments.

tmo:l -okʼ
{to shoot} -1SG.INFL
"I am shooting."

hoʔopʼ -es
{build a fire} -2SG.IMP.INFL
"Build a fire!"

The same is true for nominals and nominal groups, which can stand alone as complete sentences, following a similar pattern to the equational sentences already mentioned.

kwesi twegoh
ADV raccoon
"And it was the raccoon."

Complex sentences are formed along similar principles to these, but with expanded verbals or nominals, or verbals and/or nominals connected by coordinators.

Word order is sometimes used to distinguish between the categories of subject and object.

ku pegək noʔpʼeʔn mewiɬ
the man {to chase} elk
"The man chased the elk."

However, if the morphological inflections are sufficiently unambiguous, it is not necessary to maintain a strict word order.

nekac new -ohpeʔn ku wencokws
1SG.OBJ {to see} -3SG.INFL ART woman
"The woman saw me."

In the sentences composed of a subject and a verb, the two are often interchangeable.

helom -eʔy ku pegək
{to dance} -3SG.INFL ART man
"The man dances."

ku pegək helom -eʔy
ART man {to dance} -3SG.INFL
"The man dances."

== Bibliography ==
- Atherton, Kelley (October 16, 2010). "Back from the Brink: Learning the Yurok Language". The Daily Triplicate. Archived from the original on December 13, 2012.
- Blevins, Juliette (2003). "The phonology of Yurok glottalized sonorants: Segmental fission under syllabification". International Journal of American Linguistics. 69 (4): 371–396. doi:10.1086/382738. S2CID 14886779.
- Campbell, Lyle (1997). American Indian languages: The historical linguistics of Native America. New York: Oxford University Press.
- Dixon, Roland; Kroeber, Alfred L. (1913). "New linguistic families in California". American Anthropologist. 5: 1–26. doi:10.1525/aa.1903.5.1.02a00020. hdl:2027/uc1.31158008344169.
- Goddard, Ives (1975). "Algonquian, Wiyot, and Yurok: Proving a distant genetic relationship". In Kinkade, M. D.; Hale, K. L.; Werner, O. (eds.). Linguistics and anthropology in honor of C. F. Voegelin. Lisse: Peter de Ridder Press. pp. 249–262.
- Goddard, Ives (1979). "Comparative Algonquian". In Campbell, L.; Mithun, M. (eds.). The languages of native America: Historical and comparative assessment. Austin: University of Texas Press. pp. 70–132.
- Goddard, Ives (1990). "Algonquian linguistic change and reconstruction". In Baldi, P. (ed.). Linguistic change and reconstruction methodology. Berlin: Mouton de Gruyter. pp. 99–114.
- Golla, Victor (2011). California Indian Languages. Berkeley: University of California Press. ISBN 978-0-520-26667-4.
- Haas, Mary R. (1958). "Algonkian-Ritwan: The end of a controversy". International Journal of American Linguistics. 24 (3): 159–173. doi:10.1086/464453.
- Hinton, Leanne (1994). Flutes of fire: Essays on Californian Indian languages. Berkeley: Heyday Books.
- Michelson, Truman (1914). "Two alleged Algonquian languages of California". American Anthropologist. 16 (2): 361–367. doi:10.1525/aa.1914.16.2.02a00150. JSTOR 659619.
- Michelson, Truman (1915). "Rejoinder (to Edward Sapir)". American Anthropologist. 17: 4–8.
- Mithun, Marianne (1999). The languages of Native North America. Cambridge: Cambridge University Press. ISBN 0-521-23228-7.
- Robins, Robert H (1958). The Yurok Language: Grammar, Texts, Lexicon. University of California Publications in Linguistics. Vol. 15. University of California Press.
- Sapir, Edward (1913). "Wiyot and Yurok, Algonkin languages of California". American Anthropologist. 15 (4): 617–646. doi:10.1525/aa.1913.15.4.02a00040. JSTOR 659722.
- Sapir, Edward (1915a). "Algonkin languages of California: A reply". American Anthropologist. 17 (1): 188–198. doi:10.1525/aa.1915.17.1.02a00270. JSTOR 660169.
- Sapir, Edward (1915b). "Epilogue". American Anthropologist. 17: 198.
