= Beloved! Paradise! Jazz!? =

2023 album by McKinley Dixon

Studio album by McKinley Dixon
- Released: June 2, 2023
- Genre: Jazz rap
- Length: 28:41
- Label: City Slang

McKinley Dixon chronology
| For My Mama and Anyone Who Look Like Her (2021) | Beloved! Paradise! Jazz!? (2023) | Magic, Alive! (2025) |

Singles from Beloved! Paradise! Jazz!?
- 1. "Sun, I Rise" Released: November 30, 2022; 2. "Tyler, Forever" Released: January 17, 2023; 3. "Run, Run, Run" Released: March 7, 2023; 4. "Beloved! Paradise! Jazz!?" Released: April 26, 2023; 5. "Dedicated to Tar Feather" Released: May 30, 2023

Beloved! Paradise! Jazz!? is the fourth studio album from American musician McKinley Dixon. Released on June 2, 2023, it is a jazz rap album.

== Background and release ==
On November 30, 2022, the album's first single, "Sun, I Rise", featuring Angélica Garcia was released. The album's second single, "Tyler, Forever", a tribute to a friend who died, was released on January 17, 2023. On March 7, the third single, "Run, Run, Run" was released. On April 26, the album's fourth single, title track "Beloved! Paradise! Jazz!?" was released. The album's fifth single, "Dedicated to Tar Feather" featuring Anjimile was released on May 30.

The album's title references three of Toni Morrison's novels: Beloved, Paradise, and Jazz. The cover art, which features a "comic-style" drawing of a Black boy, was drawn by artist Ladon Alex and inspired by Dixon's interest in the field of animation.

== Critical reception ==
Professional ratings
Aggregate scores
| Source | Rating |
|---|---|
| Metacritic | 83/100 |
Review scores
| Source | Rating |
| Beats Per Minute | 80/100 |
| DIY | 4/4 stars |
| Exclaim! | 8/10 |
| God Is in the TV | 9/10 |
| The Guardian | 4/5 stars |
| HipHopDX | 3.6/5 |
| Loud and Quiet | 7/10 |
| Sputnikmusic | 4.5/5 |

According to the review aggregator Metacritic, Beloved! Paradise! Jazz!? received "universal acclaim" based on a weighted average score of 83 out of 100 from 6 critic scores.

Writing for DIY, Ed Lawson praised the album's lyricism and storytelling, writing, "[N]ot only does McKinley Dixon's lyrical dexterity and his ability to paint pictures with words make the record one arguably worthy of such literary pedigree, but the words themselves go some way to show what he's included on it, juxtaposing compellingly-delivered tales of contemporary life with lusciously-arranged jazz instrumentation, as warm, inviting and smooth as his stories occasionally turn unforgiving." Beats Per Minute's Steve Forstneger commended how the album's themes were inspired by Toni Morrison, stating, "Like both Morrison's books and Dixon, BELOVED!'s geography needs ironing out. [...] Thematic and lyrical motifs find repetition throughout the album like a musical director slowly pulling the strings together." Writing for Sputnikmusic, Worden praised the album's production, stating the album "presents itself in broad, sweeping strokes, impressionist-esque in its lush arrangements [...] with plentiful soul influence and smooth jazz shining in the vibrant colors." He also praised the instrumentation, writing, "String instruments confidently swing through, rising and falling through tunes as Dixon's charismatic baritone voice rides their waves, all while vivacious brass contributions and a funky bass weave through the swells, setting a concise and consistent foundation that defines the record." Kyle Kohner of Exclaim! wrote that "Dixon continues to show off his acrobatic way with words and parades his affecting precision of imagery." Writing for HipHopDX, Eric Diep describes the album as "beautifully written, using imagery of fists clenched, finding your heart, and smiling in the sunshine." Shaad D'Souza's review for The Guardian states that the album's songs "possess a renewed urgency and velocity." Julia Mason of God Is in the TV praised the album's themes, writing that it acknowledged "the complex trauma of the Black American experience through the cathartic act of storytelling."

=== Year-end lists ===
Select year-end rankings of Beloved! Paradise! Jazz!?
| Critic/Publication | List | Rank | Ref. |
|---|---|---|---|
| Consequence | The 50 Best Albums of 2023 | 7 | |
| Paste | The 50 Best Albums of 2023 | 3 | |
| Rolling Stone | The 100 Best Albums of 2023 | 54 | |
| Sputnikmusic | Top 50 Albums of 2023 | 32 | |
| The Line of Best Fit | The Best Albums of 2023 | 13 | |

== Track listing ==
Beloved! Paradise! Jazz!? track listing
| No. | Title | Writer(s) | Length |
|---|---|---|---|
| 1. | "Hanif Reads Toni" (featuring Hanif) | McKinley Dixon; Hanif Abdurraqib; Constantino; Toni Morrison | 2:23 |
| 2. | "Sun, I Rise" (featuring Angélica Garcia) | Dixon; Sam Koff; Angélica Garcia | 3:21 |
| 3. | "Mezzanine Tippin'" (featuring Teller Bank$ & Alfred.) | Dixon; Teller Bank$; Alfred. | 2:47 |
| 4. | "Run, Run, Run" | Dixon; Koff | 3:02 |
| 5. | "Live! from the Kitchen Table" (featuring Ghais Guevara) | Dixon; Koff; Ghais Guevara | 3:23 |
| 6. | "Tyler, Forever" | Dixon; Koff; Reggie Pace | 3:02 |
| 7. | "Dedicated to Tar Feather" (featuring Anjimile) | Dixon; Koff; Anjimile; Trey Pollard | 2:36 |
| 8. | "The Story so Far – Interlude" | Dixon | 1:06 |
| 9. | "The Story so Far" (featuring Seline Haze) | Dixon; Koff; Constantino; Seline Haze | 2:50 |
| 10. | "Beloved! Paradise! Jazz!?" (featuring Ms. Jaylin Brown) | Dixon; Koff | 4:07 |
| Total length: | | | 28:41 |
