= Brad Allen Williams =

- Born: Brad Allen Williams; September 10, 1980 (age 45); Memphis, Tennessee, United States
- Genres: Jazz, rock, soul, gospel
- Occupations: Musician, composer, producer
- Instruments: Guitar, vocals, bass guitar, drums, keyboards
- Website: bradallenwilliams.com

Brad Allen Williams (born September 10, 1980) is an American guitarist, producer, and songwriter/composer. He was born and raised in Memphis, Tennessee, United States, and currently lives in Los Angeles, California. His playing has been described as “a distinctly post-psychedelic guitar heroism” and has drawn comparison to players ranging from Wes Montgomery to Jimi Hendrix and The Edge.

== Selected recordings ==
=== As leader ===
- œconomy (Colorfield, 2023)
- Lamar (Sojourn, 2015)

=== As a sideman ===
- Brittany Howard: What Now (Island Records, 2024)
- Brandy: Christmas With Brandy (Motown, 2023)
- Anjimile: The King (4AD, 2023)
- Nate Smith: Kinfolk 2: See The Birds (Edition Records, 2021)
- Brittany Howard: Live at Sound Emporium (ATO Records, 2020)
- Bilal: "Voyage 19" (HighBreedMusic, 2020)
- José James: Lean On Me (Blue Note, 2018)
- Various Artists: Spirit & Time (Blue Note, 2018)
- CeCe Winans: Let Them Fall In Love (PureSprings Gospel, 2017)
- Bruce Williams: Private Thoughts (Passin’ Thru, 2016)
- José James: While You Were Sleeping (Blue Note, 2014)
- Sly5thAve: Akuma (Truth Revolution Records, 2014)
- Cory Henry: Gotcha Now Doc (2012)

=== As producer or co-producer ===
- Denitia: Highways (2021)
- José James: While You Were Sleeping (Blue Note, 2014)
- Sly5thAve: Akuma (Truth Revolution Records, 2014)
- Adesuwa: Air Light (2016)
- Camille Trust: Move On (2018)
