= McKinley Dixon =

American rapper (born 1995)

- Also known as: MC Dixon
- Born: McKinley Dixon; October 28, 1995 (age 30); Annapolis, Maryland, U.S.
- Genres: Conscious hip-hop; jazz rap
- Occupations: Rapper; singer-songwriter
- Years active: 2015–present
- Labels: Spacebomb; City Slang

McKinley Dixon (born October 28, 1995) is an American rapper and singer-songwriter from Richmond, Virginia.

== Background ==
Dixon was born on October 28, 1995, in Annapolis, Maryland. He attended Virginia Commonwealth University in Richmond, Virginia and studied animation. Around this time, he released two studio albums, his debut Who Taught You to Hate Yourself? in 2016 and his second album, The Importance of Self Belief.

On May 7, 2021, Dixon released his third studio album, For My Mama and Anyone Who Look Like Her, which was met with critical acclaim. Lucy Shanker from Consequence gave the album an "A" rating calling the album "a work of art. It encompasses numerous genres; it's a jazz piece, it’s a marching band showcase, it's a spoken word performance, it's a rap album. It's a stunning exploration of the Black experience." Kyle Kohner, writing for Exclaim! said the album is "compellingly verbose and, at times, boastful rapping style, but he also wields an impressive level of lyrical complexity. The emcee operates with a film director's eye, one that places himself in the actor's shoes, often offering multi-pronged characters that aim to make sense of himself and those who look like him." On Beats Per Minute, Conor Lochrie described the album "an unfolding narrative which could be considered a thesis, Dixon emphasizes the commodification of Black art by White people: where Black art often seems like it has to have a greater point, a higher purpose – indulging in traumatic images of violence in racial horror, as in the above case – white people, contrastingly, get to make whatever art they wish."

In 2022, Dixon appeared in Soul Glo's track "Spiritual Level of Gang Shit" on their studio album Diaspora Problems. On March 7, 2023, Dixon announced the album Beloved! Paradise! Jazz!? and released the single "Run, Run, Run". The full album was released through City Slang on June 2, 2023, and attracted widespread critical acclaim. Robin Murray of Clash noted that the album title is derived "from a phrase used by the novelist Toni Morrison", and identified the choice of title as a nod to the "literary flair" of Dixon's output.

On February 19, 2025, Dixon announced his fifth studio album, Magic, Alive!, which was released by City Slang on June 6. With the announcement came the lead single, "Sugar Water", featuring Quelle Chris and Anjimile. The full album released June 6, 2025 and received similar widespread critical acclaim. Dixon later embarked on a tour in support of the album the same year called "Magic, Is Alive!" The tour featured stops around the United States from August to September (save for concerts in Brooklyn, Philadelphia, D.C., and Richmond, which were rescheduled to December), as well as stops around Europe from October to November. Dixon has another planned tour in China in April 2026.

== Discography ==
=== Studio albums ===
- Who Taught You to Hate Yourself? (2016)
- The Importance of Self Belief (2018)
- For My Mama and Anyone Who Look Like Her (2021)
- Beloved! Paradise! Jazz!? (2023)
- Magic, Alive! (2025)

=== Extended plays ===
- The House That Got Knocked Down (2020)

=== Singles ===
- "Anansi, Anansi" (2019)
- "Sun Back" (2020)
- "Make a Poet Black" (2021)
- "Swangin'" (2021)
- "Chain Sooo Heavy" (2021)
- "Bless the Child" (2021)
- "Sun, I Rise" (2022)
- "Tyler, Forever" (2023)
- "Run, Run, Run" (2023)
- "Sugar Water" (2025)
- "Could've Been Different" (2025)
- "Recitatif" (2025)
- "Magic, Alive!" (2025)
