= Magic, Alive! =

Studio album by McKinley Dixon
- Released: June 6, 2025
- Genres: Jazz rap; conscious hip-hop
- Length: 35:08
- Label: City Slang
- Producers: Sam Koff; Sam E. Yamaha

McKinley Dixon chronology
Beloved! Paradise! Jazz!? (2023)	Magic, Alive! (2025)

Singles from Magic, Alive!
- 1. "Sugar Water" Released: February 19, 2025; 2. "Magic, Alive!" Released: June 4, 2025

Magic, Alive! is the fifth studio album by American rapper and singer McKinley Dixon. It was released on June 6, 2025, through the City Slang label.

== Release ==
On February 19, 2025, Dixon announced he would be releasing a new album and released the single "Sugar Water", featuring Quelle Chris and Anjimile. The title track, "Magic, Alive!", was released alongside its music video on June 4, 2025. Magic, Alive! was officially released on June 6, 2025, through City Slang.

== Critical reception ==
Professional ratings
Aggregate scores
Source	Rating
Metacritic	83/100
Review scores
Source	Rating
DIY	4/5 stars
Paste	9.4/10
Rolling Stone	3.5/5 stars
Sputnikmusic	4.5/5 stars

According to the review aggregator Metacritic, Magic, Alive! received "universal acclaim" based on a weighted average score of 83 out of 100 from 5 critic scores. Matt Mitchell, writing for Paste, hailed the album a "conceptual, allegorical achievement", praising Dixon's ability to create "nearly a dozen short stories touched by a block-wide echo". Tom Morgan of DIY described it as "rife with layers of instrumentation, guest features, and cover art painted in striking bright hues", praising the conceptual storytelling of the album.

=== Year-end lists ===
Publication	Accolade	Rank	Ref.
Consequence	The 50 Best Albums of 2025	24	
Consequence	The 25 Best Rap Albums of 2025	4	
HotNewHipHop	The 40 Best Rap Albums of 2025	6	
The Independent	The 20 best albums of 2025	2	
Paste	50 Best Albums of 2025	10	
Paste	The 25 best rap albums of 2025	3	
PopMatters	The 80 Best Albums of 2025	74	

== Track listing ==
Magic, Alive! track listing
No.	Title	Lyrics	Music	Producer(s)	Length
1.	"Watch My Hands"	McKinley Dixon	Dixon; Sam E. Yamaha	Yamaha	1:46
2.	"Sugar Water" (featuring Quelle Chris and Anjimile)	Dixon; Anjimile; Quelle Chris	Dixon; Anjimile; Quelle Chris; Yamaha	Yamaha	2:01
3.	"Crooked Stick" (featuring Ghais Guevara and Alfred)	Dixon; Alfred; Ghais Guevara	Dixon; Alfred; Ghais Guevara; Yamaha	Yamaha	2:31
4.	"Recitatif" (featuring Teller Banks)	Dixon; Teller Banks	Dixon; Teller Banks; Yamaha	Yamaha	4:03
5.	"Run, Run, Run Pt. II"	Dixon	Dixon	Sam Koff	3:08
6.	"We're Outside, Rejoice!"	Dixon	Dixon	Koff	4:13
7.	"All the Loved Ones (What Would We Do???)" (featuring IceColdBishop and Pink Siifu)	Dixon; IceColdBishop	Dixon; IceColdBishop; Yamaha	Yamaha; Koff	4:46
8.	"F.F.O.L." (featuring Teller Banks)	Dixon; Teller Banks; Yamaha	Dixon; Teller Banks	Yamaha; Koff	2:51
9.	"Listen Gentle"	Dixon	Dixon	Koff	4:16
10.	"Magic, Alive!"	Dixon	Dixon; Yamaha	Yamaha	2:42
11.	"Could've Been Different" (featuring Blu and Shamir)	Dixon; Blu	Dixon; Blu; Yamaha	Yamaha	2:51

== Personnel ==
Credits adapted from Tidal.

- McKinley Dixon – lead vocals
- Dave Kutch – mastering
- Jason Agel – mixing
- Alex Dejong – engineering
- Kyle Williams – engineering
- Eli Owens – harp (tracks 1, 9)
- DeSean Gault – drums (tracks 2–8, 10, 11)
- Anthony Cavanaugh – bass guitar (tracks 2, 4–11)
- Sam Koff – trumpet (tracks 2, 5, 9), keyboards (6)
- Stephen Roach – piano (tracks 2, 9–11), keyboards (5)
- Joseph Clarke – background vocals (tracks 2, 9, 10)
- Teeny – saxophone (tracks 2, 11)
- Sarah Tudzin – guitar (track 2)
- Anjimile – vocals (track 2)
- Quelle Chris – vocals (track 2)
- Etienne Stoufflet – saxophone (tracks 3, 6, 10)
- Alfred – vocals (track 3)
- Ghais Guevara – vocals (track 3)
- Teller Banks – vocals (tracks 4, 8)
- Reggie Pace – trombone (track 5)
- Elizabeth Moen – background vocals (track 7)
- Sinkane – background vocals (track 7)
- The Lil Homies – background vocals (track 7)
- IceColdBishop – vocals (track 7)
- Pink Siifu – vocals (7)
- Palehound – guitar (track 8)
- Brandi Wellman – background vocals (tracks 9, 10)
- Tasheera Wellman – background vocals (tracks 9, 10)
- Gina Sobel – flute (track 9)
- Sam E. Yamaha – piano (tracks 10, 11)
