= What Now (Brittany Howard album) =

Studio album by Brittany Howard
- Released: February 9, 2024
- Genre: Psychedelic soul; funk; jazz; electro
- Length: 38:21
- Label: Island
- Producer: Brittany Howard; Shawn Everett

Brittany Howard chronology
Jaime (Reimagined) (2021)	What Now (2024)

Singles from What Now
- 1. "What Now" Released: October 13, 2023; 2. "Red Flags" Released: November 17, 2023; 3. "Prove It to You" Released: January 26, 2024; 4. "Power to Undo" Released: February 6, 2024

What Now is the second solo studio album from Brittany Howard. It was released on February 9, 2024, as her label debut on Island Records.

== Background and promotion ==
On September 12, 2023, four years after the release of her debut Jaime, Co-CEO of Island Records Justin Eshak announced that Howard had signed with the label. At the same time, Howard revealed that new music would be on its way and shared dates for her co-headlining tour with L'Rain and Becca Mancari. Starting on November 6, the tour so far entails 14 dates through North America, with more to be announced.

On October 13, Howard shared the news of an upcoming studio album and released the eponymous lead single. Produced by Howard and Shawn Everett, the "funky title track" constitutes the "truest and bluest" song on the album with lyrics that "are brutal". The song was released as a 7-inch in December, alongside a B-side titled "Meditation". A promotion video was released on the same day and was directed by Danilo Parra.

Three other songs where released to promote the album, in the run-up to its release. The second, "Red Flags", was released on November 19, 2023, while the third, "Prove It to You", was announced by Howard, via Twitter in the following year, on January 26, 2024. A fourth single, "Power to Undo", was released three days before the album, on February 6.

== Critical reception ==
Professional ratings
Aggregate scores
Source	Rating
AnyDecentMusic?	8.0/10
Metacritic	88/100
Review scores
Source	Rating
AllMusic	4/5 stars
DIY	4/5 stars
Mojo	4/5 stars
NME	4/5 stars
The Observer	5/5 stars
Pitchfork	8.3/10
Uncut	9/10

What Now received a score of 88 out of 100 on review aggregator Metacritic based on fourteen critics' reviews, indicating "universal acclaim". AnyDecentMusic? characterized the critical consensus of 13 sources as an 8.0 out of 10

Reviewing the album for Mojo, Grayson Haver Currin found that the album "captures Howard's joy – the joy that she finds in singing, in flitting through different forms, and in saying the difficult bits through brilliant song" as Howard "plunder[s] so many styles that it might instead be called What Next". Uncut called it "a Jaime 2.0 likely to secure her status as an auteur in terms of both conception and execution" as "it's [a] bigger, freer-thinking and more dynamically audacious record". In the NME, Thomas Smith proclaimed that, "Everything from psych-jazz, electro-funk, soulful house and the occasional rocker gets a look in here. In lesser hands it's a right old mess, but not in Howard's."

Concluding the review for AllMusic, editor Stephen Thomas Erlewine felt that, "Isolated songs may hint at Howard expanded emotional and musical palette, but What Now is a proper album, where each segment expands and interlocks, providing a whole that's greater than its separate parts." Jessie Brown from DIY Magazine called the album, "Sonically sprawling ... yet also unafraid to find joy in simple pleasures" and declared, 'WHAT NOW' is a gem." Writing for The Observer, Kitty Empire claimed, "It's impossible to know what to praise the hardest: the delicate trumpet of Rod McGaha, Howard's own guitar work or her bravura vocal performance on Every Color in Blue."

In the review for Pitchfork, Claire Shaffer declared that, "Every song here, even the slow stuff, feels giant and propulsive—a grand celestial tour of rock and R&B, guided by one of the few singers and multi-instrumentalists with the range and intuition to pull it off." Going into detail, Shaffer described Howard's songwriting as, "construct[ing] narratives that start from an impressionistic fragment of a feeling—uncertainty, indignation, crushing desire—and lets the music take you the rest of the way."

=== Year-end lists ===
Select year-end rankings for What Now
Publication/critic	Accolade	Rank	Ref.
MOJO	The Best Albums Of 2024	40	
Uncut	80 Best Albums of 2024	35	

== Track listing ==
All tracks are written by Brittany Howard, except where noted.

What Now track listing
No.	Title	Length
1.	"Earth Sign"	3:38
2.	"I Don't"	3:22
3.	"What Now" (Howard, Taylor Ann Avis Bogner)	3:46
4.	"Red Flags"	4:27
5.	"To Be Still" (Howard, Brad Allen Williams)	2:27
6.	"Interlude"	0:38
7.	"Another Day"	2:14
8.	"Prove It to You"	3:20
9.	"Samson"	5:17
10.	"Patience"	3:16
11.	"Power to Undo"	2:50
12.	"Every Color in Blue"	3:06
Total length:		38:21

== Personnel ==
Musicians

- Brittany Howard – vocals (all tracks), piano (track 1), guitar (2, 3, 5, 11, 12), keyboards (4, 7, 8), bass (10)
- Nate Smith – drums (tracks 1–4, 7–12)
- Zac Cockrell – bass (tracks 2, 3, 5, 7–12)
- Lloyd Buchanan – keyboards (tracks 3, 8–11)
- Paul Horton – keyboards (tracks 3, 9, 10), piano (12)
- Brad Allen Williams – guitar (tracks 4, 5)
- Rod McGaha – trumpet (tracks 9, 12)

Technical

- Brittany Howard – production, mixing (all tracks); engineering (track 6)
- Shawn Everett – co-production (all tracks); mixing, engineering (tracks 1–5, 7–12)
- Emily Lazar – mastering
- Chris Allgood – mastering

== Charts ==
Chart performance for What Now
Chart (2024)	Peak position
Belgian Albums (Ultratop Flanders)	75
Scottish Albums (OCC)	45
UK Album Downloads (OCC)	38
US Top Album Sales (Billboard)	33
