= Giver Taker =

Studio album by Anjimile
- Released: September 18, 2020
- Genres: Country; indie folk; folk
- Length: 27:03
- Label: Father/Daughter

Anjimile chronology
Colors (2018)	Giver Taker (2020)	The King (2023)

Giver Taker is the debut studio album by American musician Anjimile. It was released on September 18, 2020, by Father/Daughter Records.

== Release ==
Anjimile announced the release of their debut studio album on July 8, 2020.

=== Singles ===
On July 8, 2020, the first single "Maker" was released, alongside the announcement of the album. In a press release, Anjimile explained how the song relates to "coming to terms with my transgender identity, ruminating on the lack of acceptance from my parents, and kind of relating my transness to the father/son/holy ghost trinity." The song was featured on Paste's 7 Best Songs of the Week for July 10, 2020.

On August 12, 2020, the second single "Baby No More" was released. Of the single, Anjimile explained that they had written the song a month before they got sober, saying "I was in a romantic relationship but I was not taking care of myself in any sense of the phrase, and thusly the relationship was suffering as a result. At the time I quite literally felt like I was losing my mind vis a vis alcoholism. Active alcoholism and committed romantic relationships generally do not mix well, and ‘Baby No More’ is more or less what happens when you're not a good boyfriend. Although it's got a very groovy and relatively light-hearted musical vibe, some of the lyrics are quite dark."

The third single "In Your Eyes" was released on September 2, 2020, and focuses on Anjimile's struggles of grappling with homophobia. The music video for the single was produced by Gabe Goodman and Justine Bowe.

== Critical reception ==
Professional ratings
Aggregate scores
Source	Rating
AnyDecentMusic?	7.7/10
Metacritic	80/100
Review scores
Source	Rating
Beats Per Minute	80%
Consequence of Sound	B+
The Line of Best Fit	8.5/10
Loud and Quiet	7/10
The Observer	4/5 stars
Paste	8.6/10
Pitchfork	7.5/10

Giver Taker was met with "generally favorable" reviews from critics. At Metacritic, which assigns a weighted average rating out of 100 to reviews from mainstream publications, this release received an average score of 80 based on 9 reviews. Aggregator Album of the Year gave the release a 79 out of 100 based on a critical consensus of 10 reviews. At AnyDecentMusic?, which assigns a normalized rating out of 10 to reviews from mainstream publications, the album received a weighted average score of 7.7 based on 7 reviews.

Writing for Beats Per Minute, Gareth O'Malley said: "Chronicling grief and loss, and written while recuperating from drug and alcohol abuse, the debut album from Boston’s Anjimile Chitambo is an intense affair dressed up in sumptuous ornamentation." He went on to say the "set of songs, intimate and filled with lyrical and musical nuances that encourage repeated listening, is supremely rewarding." Kitty Empire of The Observer gave the album four stars out of five, explaining "Tracks like Maker or Ndimakukonda boast compelling African instrumentation and cadences, putting significant stylistic space between Anjimile and [Sufjan] Stevens. Throughout, the production – also by relative unknowns – is pin-sharp and generous." Candace McDuffie of Paste gave the release an 8.6 out of 10, saying the release "is captivating in its detailed storytelling, luscious harmonies and admirable vulnerability. Anjimile’s devotion to his craft is both inspiring and harrowing, which we hear in the highs and lows of this consummate project. His trials and tribulations have only fueled his creative vision."

=== Accolades ===
Accolades for Giver Taker
Publication	Accolade	Rank
Consequence of Sound	Top 50 Albums of 2020	36
NPR Music	Top 50 Albums of 2020	48

== Track listing ==
Giver Taker track listing
No.	Title	Length
1.	"Your Tree"	2:45
2.	"Baby No More"	2:44
3.	"In Your Eyes"	3:07
4.	"1978"	4:28
5.	"Not Another Word"	2:56
6.	"Maker"	2:57
7.	"Ndimakukonda"	1:38
8.	"Giver Taker"	2:11
9.	"To Meet You There"	4:17

== Personnel ==
Musicians

- Anjimile Chithambo – primary artist, guitar
- Justine Bowe – clarinet, piano, wurlitzer, backing vocals
- Gabe Goodman – bass
- Ben Chapoteau-Katz – saxophone
- Andy Fordyce – drums
- Susan Mandel – cello
- Sam Moss – banjo, violin
- Zac Coe – congas, drums
- Kristina Teuschler – clarinet
- Samuel Lee – saxophone
- Kyra Sims – French horn
- Rachel Sumner – flute
- Eric Seligmann – trumpet
- Fiona Wood – violin
- Maria Kowalski – violin
- Sarah Grella – backing vocals

Production

- Justine Bowe – producer, arranger
- Gabe Goodman – engineer, producer
- Will Radin – engineer, mixing
- Eric Seligmann – arranger
- Joe Lambert – mastering

Other personnel

- Rebecca Larios – cover painting
- Amy Madden – layout
