= Anjimile =

American folk singer-songwriter

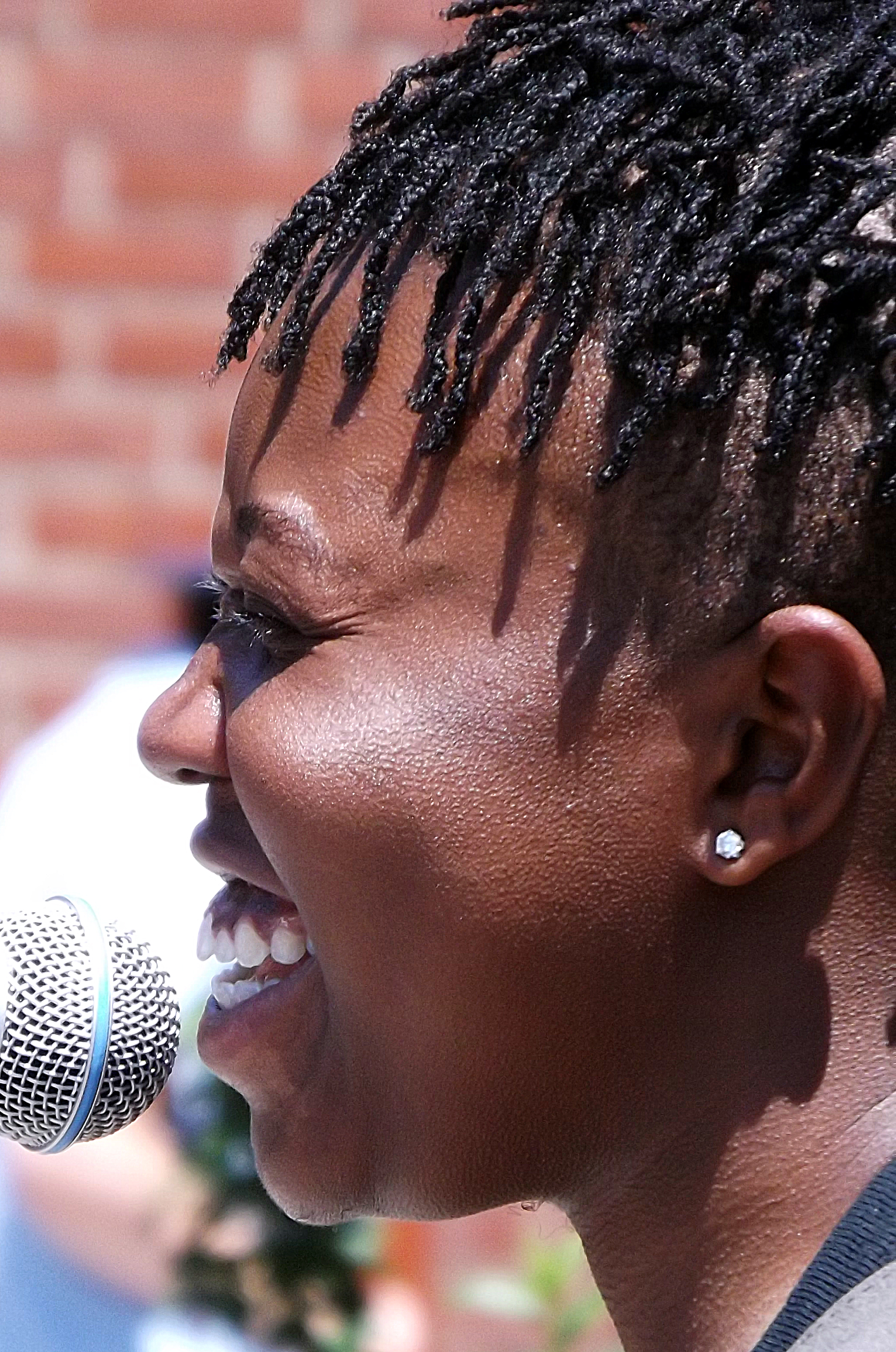
Anjimile performing at Jamaica Plain Porch Fest in 2015.

Anjimile Chithambo, better known under the mononym Anjimile (/əˈn ˈd͡ʒɪm ːə liː/ ann-JIM-uh-lee), is an American folk singer-songwriter from Boston, Massachusetts.

== Early life ==
Anjimile was born in 1993 and raised in Dallas before eventually moving to Boston. In an interview with Sound of Boston, they (Note: Anjimile uses he/him and they/them pronouns. This article uses they/them for consistency.) note that the second song they wrote, "Apocolypse Now," was inspired by a "tumultuous time in high school" and about being excited to move to Boston and leaving behind the constraints of the Texan suburbs.

Growing up, they started playing guitar at 11, and sang in choirs starting in the fifth grade and continuing until college. Their early musical influence came through listening to their dad's Oliver Mtukudzi albums in the car, and early Sufjan Stevens.

Later influences were getting sober and connecting with their Black Malawian roots. Anjimile identified as a lesbian for 10 years, before coming out as trans. They self-describe as "queer/trans/boy king" and use both they/them and he/him pronouns.

== Career ==
=== 2016–2020 ===
Anjimile began writing songs when they were a music industry student at Northeastern University, and wrote most of Giver Taker while in rehab in Florida in 2016, where they got sober. In 2018, they entered NPR Music's Tiny Desk Concert contest, and a panel from Boston affiliate WBUR named them the best entrant from Massachusetts. The following year, a Live Arts Boston grant from a pair of local non-profit foundations gave them the budget to make Giver Taker. Prior to releasing the full-length album, Anjimile had self-produced and released numerous albums of their own.

Anjimile released Giver Taker in 2020 through Father/Daughter Records in the first year of the COVID-19 pandemic. International booking agencies had taken an interest in booking them but they could not tour due to the risk of COVID-19 transmission. Anjimile held a virtual release show for the album. NPR named the album one of the best 50 albums of 2020. Rolling Stone Magazine praised Anjimile as an "artist you need to know" and their song "Baby No More" as a "Song You Need To Know". Anjimile was also Consequence of Sound's Artist of the Month".

=== 2021–present ===
In 2021, they signed to 4AD, and released their EP, Reunion, which included reimagined, orchestral versions of songs from Giver Taker, with guest artists Jay Som, SASAMI, and Lomelda. In 2022, they toured with Hurray for the Riff Raff. In 2023, they were featured on McKinley Dixon's album, Beloved! Paradise! Jazz!?, and signed an open letter to SXSW from the Union Of Musicians And Allied Workers demanding higher pay.

In May 2023, Anjimile released the track “The King,” which Pitchfork wrote, "transforms acoustic guitar and his own voice into a whiplashing storm". The release of the track also served as an announcement of Anjimile's album The King, which was released on September 8, 2023, and features contributions from Justine Bowe, Brad Allen Williams, Sam Gendel, and James Krivchenia.

== Discography ==
=== As lead artist ===
Albums
Title	Label	Year	Source
Human Nature	Human Nature Records	2015	
Good Boy	Self-released	2016	
Colors	Industry Lab	2018	
Giver Taker	Father/Daughter Records	2020	
The King	4AD	2023	
You're Free To Go	4AD	2026	

Extended plays
Title	Year	Source
Snow Day	2015	
Maker Mixtape	2019	
Reunion	2021	
Reunion (Instrumentals)	2021	

Singles
Title	Year	Source
“Sonja Smokes Me Out”	2019	
“Maker (Acoustic Version)”	2020	
“Ever New”	2021	
“Stranger”	2021	
“The King”	2023	
“Father”	2023	
"Animal"	2023	
"Black Hole"	2023	
"Marcie"	2025	
"Auld Lang Syne II"	2025	

Music videos
Title	Year	Source
“Therapy”	2015	
“Baby No More”	2020	

=== As featured artist ===
Albums
Title	Album	Artist	Label	Year	Source
"Losing Crowns II"	Why the Wild Things Are	Cliff Notez	HipStory	2019	
"Coyote Creek"	How Many More Times	Esther Rose	Father/Daughter Records	2021	
"Waverly - Anjimile Version"	The Baby Reimagined	Samia	Grand Jury	2021	
"Dedicated to Tar Feather"	Beloved! Paradise! Jazz!?	McKinley Dixon	City Slang	2023	
"Wolf Like Me"	Transa	Bartees Strange, Kara Jackson	Red Hot	2024	
"Sugar Water"	Magic, Alive!	McKinley Dixon	City Slang	2025	
