= For My Mama and Anyone Who Look Like Her =

2021 album by McKinley Dixon

Studio album by McKinley Dixon
- Released: May 7, 2021
- Genre: Jazz rap; conscious hip hop
- Length: 47:57
- Label: Spacebomb

McKinley Dixon chronology
The Importance of Self Belief (2018)	For My Mama and Anyone Who Look Like Her (2021)	Beloved! Paradise! Jazz!? (2023)

Singles from For My Mama and Anyone Who Look Like Her
- 1. "make a poet Black" Released: February 16, 2021; 2. "Swangin'" Released: March 9, 2021; 3. "Chain Sooo Heavy" Released: April 6, 2021; 4. "Bless the Child" Released: April 27, 2021

For My Mama and Anyone Who Look Like Her is the third studio album from American hip-hop musician McKinley Dixon. Released on May 7, 2021, it is a jazz rap and conscious hip hop album.

== Background and release ==
The album marked Dixon's first release on Spacebomb. Dixon discusses themes of racism, anxiety, and death across the album, explaining in the album's biography that "these things I talk about on the record have had harmful and brilliant effects on my timeline, and have forced me to be cognizant of the fact that living is complex."

== Critical reception ==
Professional ratings
Review scores
Source	Rating
Loud and Quiet	8/10
Still Listening	90/100

Bandcamp Daily wrote that "the twists and turns in the music, themes, and lyrics serve as a reminder that with all of the loss and grief that comes along with being Black in this ugly, hostile world." Post-Trash said that the album "unabashedly expresses the totality of the artist," succeeding "at combining aggression and cynicism with the message that pure love, sincerity, and vulnerability are some of the most crucial feelings needed to survive and thrive." The album was awarded the first annual Newlin Music Prize in Richmond, VA in March, 2022.

== Track listing ==
For My Mama and Anyone Who Look Like Her track listing
No.	Title	Length
1.	"Chain Sooo Heavy"	4:40
2.	"Never Will Know" (featuring Micah James and Gold Midas)	5:16
3.	"Bless the Child"	3:06
4.	"make a poet Black"	4:36
5.	"protective styles" (featuring Abby T.)	4:28
6.	"Swangin'"	2:56
7.	"brown shoulders" (featuring Ms. Jaylin Brown)	3:44
8.	"B.B.N.E." (featuring Teller Bank$)	4:37
9.	"Grown Man Voice" (featuring Micah James, LORD JAH-MONT OGBON, and Pink Siifu)	4:23
10.	"Mama's Home" (featuring Alfred.)	5:23
11.	"Twist My Hair" (featuring Deau Eyes)	4:48
Total length:		47:57
