= Thunderbitch (album) =

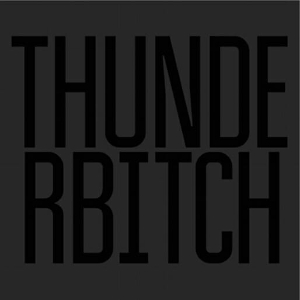

Studio album by Thunderbitch
- Released: August 29, 2015
- Genres: Rock & roll; punk rock; garage punk; garage rock; lo-fi
- Label: ATO

Thunderbitch is the self-titled debut recording by Thunderbitch, a band founded by singer and guitarist Brittany Howard.

== Composition ==
The songs on Thunderbitch hop into garage punk, "pure", "glammy" punk rock, and "wild and trashy" rock and roll, with roots rock and talking blues. It also dons a "raucously" lo-fi sound.

== Critical reception ==
Professional ratings
Aggregate scores
Source	Rating
Metacritic	80/100
Review scores
Source	Rating
AllMusic	4/5 stars
The Austin Chronicle	3/5 stars
Consequence	B−
Paste	8.0/10
Rolling Stone	3.5/5 stars

Thunderbitch was released to general positivity from music critics. On Metacritic, it holds a score of 80 out of 100, indicating "generally positive reviews", based on nine reviews.

Hilary Saunders for Paste called it "consciously straightforward and unapologetically so" and the band as "the ideal side project - low-pressure and made purely for fun."

=== Accolades ===
==== Year-end lists ====
Publication	List	Year	Rank	Ref.
AllMusic	Favorite Rock Albums	2015	N/A	

== Track listing ==
All tracks are written by Brittany Howard.

Thunderbitch track listing
No.	Title	Length
1.	"Leather Jacket"	3:19
2.	"I Don't Care"	1:49
3.	"I Just Wanna Rock and Roll"	2:08
4.	"Eastside Party"	2:16
5.	"Closer"	4:41
6.	"Wild Child"	1:42
7.	"Very Best Friend"	4:43
8.	"My Baby Is My Guitar"	4:55
9.	"Let Me Do What I Do Best"	2:20
10.	"Heavenly Feeling"	4:23
Total length:		32:22
