= Diaspora Problems =

2022 studio album by Soul Glo

Studio album by Soul Glo
- Released: March 25, 2022
- Recorded: December 2020 – August 2021
- Genres: Hardcore punk; rap rock
- Length: 39:14
- Label: Epitaph
- Producers: GG Guerra; Evan Bernard; Will Yip

Soul Glo chronology
DisNigga, Vol. 2 (2021)	Diaspora Problems (2022)	Na I'm Gon Grab Allat (2027)

Soul Glo studio album chronology
The Nigga in Me Is Me (2019)	Diaspora Problems (2022)	Na I'm Gon Grab Allat (2027)

Singles from Diaspora Problems
- 1. "Jump! (Or Get Jumped by the Future!)" Released: 2022; 2. "Driponomics" Released: 2022

Diaspora Problems is the fourth studio album by American hardcore punk band Soul Glo. The album was released on March 25, 2022, through Epitaph Records, their first release with the label.

Two singles were released ahead of the album: "Jump! (Or Get Jumped by the Future!)" and "Driponomics".

== Critical reception ==
Professional ratings
Aggregate scores
Source	Rating
AnyDecentMusic?	8.0/10
Metacritic	86/100
Review scores
Source	Rating
AllMusic	4/5 stars
Beats Per Minute	85/100
Consequence	5/5 stars
Exclaim!	9/10
Glide	3.5/5 stars
Kerrang!	3/5 stars
Paste	8.8/10
Pitchfork	8.5/10
Sputnikmusic	4.2/5

Diaspora Problems received critical acclaim upon its release. On review aggregator website Metacritic, Diaspora Problems has an average rating of 86 out of 100, indicating "universal acclaim". On AnyDecentMusic?, the album has an average of 8.0 out of 10 rating based on eight critic reviews.

In 2026 Rolling Stone placed it at 71 on their list of The 100 Greatest Punk Albums of All Time.

=== Year-end lists ===
Publication	Accolade	Rank	Ref.
NPR	Best Albums of 2022	49	
Vulture	Best Albums of 2022	5	
Pitchfork	Best Albums of 2022	36	
The Wire	Best Albums of 2022	12	

== Track listing ==
All tracks are written by Pierce Jordan, GG Guerra, TJ Stevenson, and Ruben Polo

No.	Title	Length
1.	"Gold Chain Punk (whogonbeatmyass?)"	3:47
2.	"Coming Correct Is Cheaper"	3:05
3.	"Thumbsucker"	2:02
4.	"Fucked Up If True"	3:12
5.	"Jump!! (Or Get Jumped!!!)((by the future))"	3:27
6.	"Driponomics" (featuring Mother Maryrose)	2:50
7.	"(Five Years And) My Family"	2:51
8.	"The Thangs I Carry" (featuring BEARCAT)	3:17
9.	"We Wants Revenge"	2:24
10.	"John J" (featuring Kathryn Edwards and Zula Wildheart)	4:31
11.	"GODBLESSYALLREALGOOD"	3:01
12.	"Spiritual Level of Gang Shit" (featuring McKinley Dixon, Lojii)	4:54
Total length:		39:14

== Personnel ==
The following individuals were credited for their roles in the recording, composition, or mastering of the album.

Soul Glo

- GG Guerra — Bass, vocals, programming
- Pierce Jordan — Vocals
- Ruben Polo — Guitar
- T. J. Stevenson — Drums

Additional musicians

- Bearcat — Vocals (on "The Things I Carry")
- Hakim Diran — Saxophone (on "Thumbsucker" and "Spiritual Level of Gang Shit")
- McKinley Dixon — Vocals (on "Spiritual Level of Gang Shit")
- Dave Heck — Trombone (on "Thumbsucker" and "Spiritual Level of Gang Shit")
- Kathryn Edwards — Vocals (on "John J")
- Lojii — Vocals (on "Spiritual Level of Gang Shit")
- Mother Maryrose — Vocals (on "Driponomics")
- Noah Roth — Trumpet (on "Thumbsucker" and "Spiritual Level of Gang Shit")
- Zula Wildheart — Vocals (on "John J")

Recording and Mastering

- Evan Bernard — Assistant production, engineering
- GG Guerra — Production, engineering
- Noah Roth — Assistant engineering
- Will Yip — Mixing, mastering
