= Jaime (album) =

Album by Brittany Howard

Studio album by Brittany Howard
- Released: September 20, 2019
- Recorded: 2018
- Studios: Electro Vox and Subtle McNugget, Los Angeles, California, U.S.
- Genres: Funk; synth-rock; blues rock; neo soul; psychedelic funk; experimental
- Length: 35:18
- Label: ATO
- Producer: Brittany Howard

Brittany Howard chronology
Jaime (2019)	Jaime (Reimagined) (2021)

Singles from Jaime
- 1. "History Repeats" Released: June 25, 2019; 2. "Stay High" Released: July 16, 2019; 3. "He Loves Me" Released: January 20, 2020

Jaime is the debut solo studio album from Brittany Howard, released on September 20, 2019, via ATO Records. It has received acclaim from critics and has been nominated for several awards; it was a moderate sales success, appearing on several charts. The album is a mix of several musical styles that reflects intimate events and perspectives in Howard's life, which she supported with her first solo tour.

== Recording ==
I actually made some music the way I hear it... No-one tells me they don't like it, no-one says they don't like this bass part, or this arrangement's too crazy. It was just up to me to make my own mistakes.

— Brittany Howard on recording Jaime solo

The album is the first solo work from Howard, who has previously recorded with Alabama Shakes. It is dedicated to and named after her sister Jaime, who died of retinoblastoma as a teen. After experiencing writer's block, Howard put Alabama Shakes on hold to pursue side projects and to have complete control over the recording of Jaime in 2018. She reflected on her life as her 30th birthday approached and decided to record an album that explored her personal history and beliefs. In addition to discussing the death of her sister, the album explores growing up poor, the prejudice that her parents faced as an interracial couple, and her struggle with religious faith. She began recording the songs in a greenhouse in Topanga, California before heading to two Los Angeles-based studios to finalize the album.

== Musical style ==
Jaime has an eclectic style that features elements of synth-rock, blues rock, neo soul, experimental music, psychedelia, soul, gospel, funk, hip hop, contemporary R&B, electronic music, retro-soul, jazz fusion, spoken word, avant-jazz, new age, trap, noise rock, funkadelia, alternative country, power pop, and doo-wop.

According to Ann Powers of Slate, the music is a departure from the revivalist rock of Alabama Shakes, instead exploring a cross between jazz, funk, and soul. Writing for Uproxx, Steven Hyden says Howard abandons typical rock-band dynamics in favor of "darker, weirder, groovier, and more psychedelic" sounds, making it difficult to categorize the album simply as rock, R&B, or jazz. On the other hand, Consequence of Sound explicitly classifies Jaime as a synth-rock album. Pitchfork's Sheldon Pearce also observes synth-rock, although in rapid form among other elements, such as experimental psychedelic funk, old school hip hop breakbeats, and tight jazz sounds reminiscent of D'Angelo's 2014 album Black Messiah; his colleague Jillian Mapes also compares the work to D'Angelo as well as Prince and The Roots.

"13th Century Metal" is an avant-jazz and spoken word song that dives into "brilliant" noise rock later on.

== Promotion and tour ==
The release was accompanied by three singles: "History Repeats" on June 25, 2019; "Stay High" on July 16, 2019; and "He Loves Me" on January 20, 2020.

Howard also embarked on her first solo tour in promotion of the album. On the road, she and her backing band eschewed Alabama Shakes songs and only performed works from this album and her other bands.

List of concerts, showing date, city, country and venue
Date	City	Country	Venue
August 17, 2019	Asheville	United States	The Orange Peel
August 18, 2019	Asheville	United States	The Orange Peel
August 19, 2019	Nashville	United States	Ryman Auditorium
August 23, 2019	Washington	United States	9:30 Club
August 24, 2019	Washington	United States	9:30 Club
September 18, 2019	Milwaukee	United States	Riverside Theater
September 19, 2019	Saint Paul	United States	Palace Theatre
September 20, 2019	Chicago	United States	Riviera Theatre
September 22, 2019	Toronto	Canada	Rebel
September 24, 2019	New York City	United States	Beacon Theatre
September 25, 2019	Boston	United States	House of Blues
September 27, 2019	Philadelphia	United States	The Fillmore Philadelphia
October 5, 2017 (Note: The concerts in Austin on October 5 and 12, 2019, at Zilker Park, were part of the Austin City Limits Music Festival.)	Austin	United States	Zilker Park
October 8, 2019	Los Angeles	United States	Theatre at Ace Hotel
October 9, 2019	Los Angeles	United States	Theatre at Ace Hotel
October 12, 2019	Austin	United States	Zilker Park
October 13, 2019 (Note: The concert in Atlanta on October 13, 2019, at 787 Windson, was part of the Afropunk Festival.)	Atlanta	United States	787 Windsor

Howard also performed a set for NPR's Tiny Desk Concert series and made promotional appearances on Jimmy Kimmel Live! in 2019 and The Tonight Show with Jimmy Fallon and Today in 2020. Planned 2020 performances were canceled or rescheduled due to the COVID-19 pandemic.

Music videos for "Stay High" and "He Loves Me" were released, with the former featuring Terry Crews lip syncing the song.

== Reception ==
Professional ratings
Aggregate scores
Source	Rating
AnyDecentMusic?	8.2/10
Metacritic	88/100
Review scores
Source	Rating
AllMusic	4/5 stars
Chicago Tribune	3.5/4 stars
The Guardian	4/5 stars
The Independent	4/5 stars
Mojo	4/5 stars
Pitchfork	8.6/10
Q	4/5 stars
Rolling Stone	4/5 stars
The Times	5/5 stars
Uncut	9/10

According to the review aggregator Metacritic, Jaime received "universal acclaim" based on a weighted average score of 88 out of 100 from 19 critic scores. AnyDecentMusic? characterized the critical consensus of 20 sources as an 8.2 out of 10 and Album of the Year gave it an 83 out of 100, with 20 reviews.

Reviewing for Uproxx, Hyden praised the album for its differences from Howard's previous work and genre-bending mix of funk, jazz, and hip-hop. In Rolling Stone, Jon Dolan highlighted the Southern culture elements of the lyrics and summing up that her lyrics in "Georgia" make a "strikingly bold moment on a record that's full of them". Pitchfork awarded Jaime the distinction of "Best New Music", with Pearce describing it as a "thrilling opus that pushes the boundaries of voice, sound, and soul to new extremes". The Guardian's Ben Beaumont-Thomas called it "emotionally as well as musically varied" and concluded that solo projects "are rarely as beautiful as they are here". In Under the Radar, Celine Teo-Blockey found her cross-genre experimentation "stunning". Reviewing for AllMusic, Stephen Thomas Erlewine believed the album will warrant repeated listening, with "subsequent spins... profound and nourishing". In a year-end essay for Slate, Powers cited as Jaime one of her favorite albums from 2019 and proof that the format is not dead but rather undergoing a "metamorphosis". She added that concept albums had reemerged through the culturally-relevant autobiographical narratives of artists such as Howard, whose "stunning" album "went deep to reveal the joys and pain of her experience as an embodiment of that elusive state: intersectionality".

=== Accolades ===
The album opener "History Repeats" received two nominations at the 62nd Annual Grammy Awards, for Best Rock Song and Best Rock Performance Both "13th Century Metal" and "Stay High" were included on Pitchfork's list of the best songs of 2019, placing at number 98 and 42 respectively. Howard was nominated for Artist of the Year, Jaime for Album of the Year, and "Stay High" for Song of the Year at the 2020 Americana Music Honors & Awards. The album was nominated for the GLAAD Media Award for Outstanding Music Artist at the 31st GLAAD Media Awards.

Year-end list rankings for Jaime
Publication	Accolade	Rank
The A.V. Club	The 20 Best Albums of 2019	11
Billboard	The 50 Best Albums of 2019	17
Clash	Clash Albums of the Year 2019	39
Consequence of Sound	Top 50 Albums of 2019	19
Entertainment Weekly	The Best Albums of 2019	6
Exclaim!	20 Best Pop and Rock Albums of 2019	13
The Guardian	The 50 Best Albums of 2019	32
The New York Times	Best Albums of 2019	2
Paste	The 34 Best Albums of 2019	6
Pitchfork	The 50 Best Albums of 2019	12
Rolling Stone	The 50 Best Albums of 2019	15
Slate	The Best Albums of 2019	—
Slant	The 25 Best of Albums of 2019	24
Stereogum	The 50 Best Albums of 2019	45
Uproxx	The Best Albums of 2019	23
Vice Media	The 100 Best Albums of 2019	79

== Track listing ==
All songs written and produced by Brittany Howard, except where noted

No.	Title	Writer(s)	Length
1.	"History Repeats"		3:06
2.	"He Loves Me"		2:31
3.	"Georgia"		3:18
4.	"Stay High"		3:11
5.	"Tomorrow"	Paul Horton; Brittany Howard	3:13
6.	"Short and Sweet"		3:44
7.	"13th Century Metal"	Robert Glasper; Brittany Howard; Nate Smith	4:47
8.	"Baby"		2:26
9.	"Goat Head"		3:12
10.	"Presence"		2:46
11.	"Run to Me"		3:04
Total length:			35:18

== Personnel ==
- Brittany Howard – guitar on "History Repeats", "He Loves Me", "Stay High", "Baby", and "Presence"; clavinet on "Georgia"; keyboards on "Georgia" and "Run to Me"; keyboard and string arrangement on "Tomorrow"; vocals; drums on "Tomorrow", "Presence", and "Run to Me"; percussion on "Tomorrow"; bass guitar on "Tomorrow"; production; editing on "13th Century Metal"

Additional musicians

- Terry K. Anderson – sermon from Lilly Grove Missionary Baptist Church in Houston, Texas excerpt sampled in "He Loves Me"
- Lloyd Buchanan – organ on "Georgia"
- Zac Cockrell – bass guitar on "History Repeats", "He Loves Me", "Georgia", "Stay High", "Tomorrow", and "Baby"
- Robert Glasper – celesta on "Stay High", keyboards on "13th Century Metal", "Baby", and "Goat Head"
- Larry Goldings – keyboards on "Tomorrow"
- Paul Horton – clavinet on "History Repeats" and keyboard arrangement on "Tomorrow"
- Lavinia Meijer – harp on "Presence"
- Rob Moose – strings on "Tomorrow"
- Nate Smith – drums on "History Repeats", "He Loves Me", "Georgia", "Stay High", "13th Century Metal", "Baby", "Goat Head", and "Run to Me"; vibraphone on "Baby"; percussion on "Goat Head"

Technical personnel

- Chris Bellman – lacquer cutting
- Christopher Cerulo – engineering assistance
- Danny Clinch – photography
- Shawn Everett – engineering, mixing, mastering at United Recording and Subtle McNugget in Los Angeles
- Brantley Gutierrez – photography
- Michael Harris – engineering assistance
- Bob Ludwig – mastering input
- Scott Moore – mixing assistance
- Vlad Sepetov – art direction
- Ivan Wayman – mixing assistance

== Charts ==
=== Weekly charts ===
Chart performance for Jaime
Chart (2019)	Peak position
Austrian Albums (Ö3 Austria)	59
Belgian Albums (Ultratop Flanders)	29
Belgian Albums (Ultratop Wallonia)	159
Canadian Albums (Billboard)	34
Dutch Albums (Album Top 100)	76
French Albums (SNEP)	182
Japanese Albums (Oricon)	114
Scottish Albums (Official Charts)	13
Spanish Albums (PROMUSICAE)	98
UK Albums (Official Charts)	36
US Billboard 200	13
US Alternative Albums (Billboard)	3
US Americana/Folk Albums (Billboard)	1
US Independent Albums (Billboard)	2
US Top Rock Albums (Billboard)	2

=== Year-end charts ===
Annual chart performance for Jaime
Chart (2019)	Position
US Top Current Album Sales	169
US Independent Albums	26

== Jaime (Reimagined) ==
Jaime (Reimagined)

Remix album by Brittany Howard
- Released: July 23, 2021
- Length: 47:53
- Label: ATO
- Producers: 9th Wonder; Emmanuel Franklyn Adelabu; Badbadnotgood; Bon Iver; Little Dragon; James Francies; Fred again..; Jeff Gitelman; Donald Glover; Dann Hume; Jungle; Joy Anonymous; Michael Kiwanuka; Laura Mvula; Jeremy Most; Christo Runo; Tane Runo; St. Francis Hotel

Brittany Howard chronology
Jaime (2019)	Jaime (Reimagined) (2021)	What Now (2024)

Singles from Jaime (Reimagined)
- 1. "Stay High again.." Released: March 2, 2021; 2. "Presence (Little Dragon Remix)" Released: June 22, 2021; 3. "Tomorrow (Badbadnotgood Remix)" Released: June 22, 2021; 4. "Stay High (Childish Gambino Remix)" Released: July 21, 2021

Jaime (Reimagined) is the first remix album by American musician Brittany Howard. The album collects remixes of songs from her 2019 debut studio album Jaime. It was released digitally on July 23, 2021, by ATO Records, with vinyl copies shipping in September 2021. Three of the album's remixes appeared on the Jaime (The Remixes) EP released in 2020.

At the 2022 Libera Awards, Jaime (Reimagined) received a nomination for Best R&B Record. Additionally, album track "Stay High again.." was nominated for Best Dance Record.

Radio station KCRW listed the album as the fifth best of 2021, saying "this collection is pretty much an entirely new album where the versions sound totally different, but with a great deal of respect to the original body of work. Sometimes it's good to be challenged, and Jaime (Reimagined) does just that in a very unique and uplifting way."

All songs written by Brittany Howard, except where noted

=== Jaime (Reimagined) track listing ===
1. "13th Century Metal" (Michael Kiwanuka Mix, produced by Michael Kiwanuka and St. Francis Hotel) – 5:00
2. "Goat Head" (Earthgang remix, written by Howard, Eian Parker, and Olu Fann, produced by Christo Runo and Tane Runo) – 3:21
3. "Stay High" (Childish Gambino remix, produced by Donald Glover and James Francies) – 3:38
4. "Presence" (Little Dragon remix, produced by Little Dragon) – 4:46
5. "Short and Sweet" (Bon Iver remix, produced by Bon Iver) – 3:55
6. "Tomorrow" (Badbadnotgood remix, written by Howard and Paul Horton, produced by Badbadnotgood) – 3:10
7. "Baby" (Gitty remix, produced by Jeff "Gitty" Gitelman) – 2:25
8. "History Repeats" (Georgia Anne Muldrow Geemix, produced by Georgia Anne Muldrow) – 2:59
9. "Georgia" (J Most remix, produced by Jeremy Most) – 3:54
10. "Stay High again.." (produced by Emmanuel Franklyn Adelabu, Joy Anonymous, and Fred again..) – 4:20
11. "He Loves Me" (9th Wonder remix, written by Howard and Lonnie Rashid Lynn, produced by 9th Wonder) – 3:22
12. "History Repeats" (Jungle remix, produced by Jungle) – 3:52
13. "Run to Me" (Laura Mvula remix, produced by Laura Mvula and Dann Hume) – 3:03

Additional personnel include:

- Syd on "Baby" (Gitty remix)
- Emily King on "Georgia" (J Most remix)
- Joy Anonymous and Fred again.. on "Stay High again.."
- Common on "He Loves Me" (9th Wonder remix)

=== Jaime (The Remixes) track listing ===
1. "13th Century Metal" (Michael Kiwanuka Mix, produced by Kiwanuka and St. Francis Hotel) – 5:02
2. "Goat Head" (Earthgang remix, written by Howard, Parker, and Fann, produced by C. Runo and T. Runo) – 3:21
3. Short and Sweet" (Bon Iver remix, produced by Bon Iver) – 3:53

Initial releases lack the first track.

=== Charts ===
Weekly chart performance for Jaime (Reimagined)
Chart (2021)	Position
US Top Current Album Sales (Billboard)	71

== Release history ==
Release dates and formats for Jaime
Region	Date	Format	Version	Label
Various	September 20, 2019	LP; CD; digital download; streaming	Jaime	ATO
Various	September 17, 2020	Digital download; streaming	The Remixes version 1	ATO
Various	December 8, 2020	Digital download; streaming	The Remixes version 2	ATO
Various	July 23, 2021	Digital download; streaming	Reimagined	ATO
Various	September 24, 2021	LP	Reimagined	ATO
