= Paradise (Morrison novel) =

1998 novel by Toni Morrison

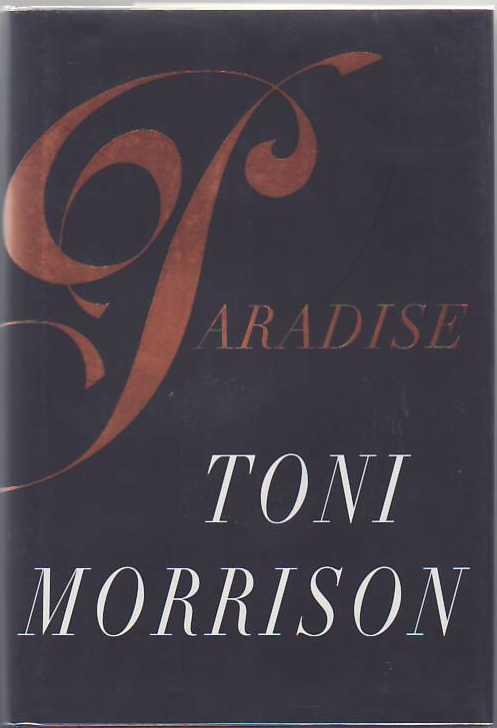
- Cover of the first edition
- Author: Toni Morrison
- Language: English
- Genre: African-American literature
- Publisher: Alfred A. Knopf Inc.
- Publication date: 1997
- Publication place: United States
- Media type: Print (hardback & paperback)
- Pages: 318
- ISBN: 0-679-43374-0 (hardback edition) & ISBN 0-452-28039-7
- OCLC: 38117575
- Dewey Decimal: 813/.54 21
- LC Class: PS3563.O8749 P37 1998b
- Preceded by: Jazz
- Followed by: Love

Paradise is a 1997 novel by Toni Morrison. The novel, Morrison’s first publication following her 1993 win for the Nobel Prize in Literature, completes a "trilogy" with Morrison’s previous novels Beloved (1987) and Jazz (1992).

Paradise was chosen as an Oprah's Book Club selection for January 1998 and ranked in the BlackBoard Bestsellers List the following August.

== Plot ==
Paradise centers on the all-Black fictional town of Ruby, Oklahoma, and the Convent, a property outside the town’s fringes where a number of highly troubled and eccentric women reside. After the men of Ruby resolve that the Convent’s women are to blame for the townspeople’s recent spate of misfortunes, they set out to murder the women in a shocking act of brutal violence. The novel’s largely non-linear story structure--which is divided into nine parts, each bearing a woman’s name--explores the storied histories of Ruby and its people, the lives of the Convent’s women, and the intertwining narratives precipitating the massacre.

=== Ruby ===
One early morning in July 1976, the most prominent men of Ruby open fire at the Convent. Once a mansion owned by a paranoid embezzler, and later a Catholic-run residential school for Native American girls, the Convent has now become a somewhat derelict homestead for five women–Connie, Mavis, Grace, Seneca, and Divine–all of whom have arrived from elsewhere. While most residents of Ruby had long publicly regarded the Convent’s women with some skepticism and curiosity, the town’s patriarchs grow increasingly distrustful of the convent’s women, deeming their presence an affront to God.

The men each represent the founding families of Ruby, a prosperous, isolated, and hierarchical all-Black town in rural Oklahoma. Twin brothers Stewart and Deacon “Deek” Morgan, the de facto leaders of Ruby and the official leaders of the massacre, reminisce about Ruby’s founding, illuminating the reasons for the town’s insularity. Before Ruby, there was Haven, originally founded in 1890 by a group containing nine complete families (the Blackhorses, Beauchamps, Catos, two DuPres families, Fleetwoods, Floods, Morgans, and Pooles) and fragments of others. The founding fathers, led by Zechariah Morgan, establish Haven as an escape from the racist violence and exclusion pervading contemporary society. When they arrive in the place where they decide to situate their new town, they first build a large and sturdy Oven of brick and iron, even though they are living in wagons and sod shelters. Haven flourishes for several decades, but falters in the years following World War II. Returning from service, Deek and Steward Morgan seek to renew the mission begun by their forefather Zechariah. In 1949, they lead a group of fifteen families out of Haven to establish a new all-black town. In the process of relocating, the town's men painstakingly transport and rebuild the Oven, although it now serves a symbolic rather than practical purpose. The new town is eventually christened “Ruby” for the younger sister of the Morgan twins, who dies in childbirth after local hospitals refuse to admit her because of her race. The inhabitants are proud of the fact that Ruby has no jail or cemetery because it has never needed either; besides Ruby Smith herself and Delia Best, no one has ever died on its soil.

By the mid-1970s, a number of troubling incidents occurred in Ruby; familial conflicts erupt into violence, while four children born into the Fleetwood family suffer from severe (but unspecified) disability or illness, and the Oven is anonymously vandalized. The men of Ruby draw connections, however tenuous, between each of these incidents and the Convent, convincing them that to murder the women would be a divinely sanctioned act in defense of their town and its legacy. As the women desperately attempt to flee for their lives, the chapter concludes: “God at their sides, the men take aim. For Ruby.”

=== Mavis ===
Mavis Albright, a young housewife, sits uncomfortably on her sofa while a local journalist inquires about the death of her children. Mavis’s infant twins, Merle and Pearl, suffocated in the family’s new Cadillac while Mavis shopped for groceries, though it’s unclear whether the twins’ deaths were accidental, intentional, or the result of Mavis’s mental illness. Mavis fears her abusive husband and dreads her seemingly sadistic young daughter, Sal. One morning, while her husband and children sleep, Mavis steals the Cadillac, has it repainted, and flees the family’s Maryland home. She initially stays at her mother’s house in New Jersey, but her mother quickly grows exasperated with Mavis’s apparent instability and paranoia. This prompts Mavis to begin driving west, with vague intents on California. When her Cadillac breaks down in rural Oklahoma, Mavis wanders on foot until she happens upon the Convent, inhabited only by a mysterious and charming blind woman, Connie, and an elderly bedridden woman Connie refers to only as “mother.” Despite planning to stay only long enough to have her car repaired, Mavis, with nowhere else to go and no real desire for much else, remains at the Convent for years.

=== Grace ===
K.D. Morgan, Deek and Steward's nephew and heir apparent of the Morgan family, learns that Arnette Fleetwood is pregnant with his child. As the couple argue, K.D. is distracted by and begins to gape at a strange and alluring woman arriving at the town bus stop. This enrages Arnette, who begins to insult K.D. for his womanizing; K.D. slaps her, triggering a massive conflict between the Morgans and Fleetwoods. The mystery woman is an eccentric, seductive, countercultural drifter named Grace, who calls herself "Gigi" and lives a free-spirited, semi-nomadic existence. On the same day that the old woman, known as “mother,” dies, Gigi arrives at the Convent, joining Connie and Mavis. Gigi begins a surreptitious affair with K.D., and despite frequent bickering and fights with Mavis, finds life within the Convent fulfilling and liberating.

=== Seneca ===
This chapter further explores the religious and familial conflicts within Ruby and its families. The Oven is vandalized with a painting of a fist, further inflaming debates over the words that should be engraved upon the Oven to honor the town’s forebears–the elder conservative contingents of the town, led by Reverend Pulliam, insist the original Oven’s engraving piously read “BEWARE THE FURROW OF HIS BROW,” whilst younger, more progressive members, following Reverend Misner, favor the more agentic “BE THE FURROW OF HIS BROW.” Meanwhile, both sons of Soane and Deek Morgan are killed in combat in Vietnam. Steward Morgan’s wife, Dovey, begins an affair with a stranger who happens by an empty house on the Morgan property. Arnette’s aforementioned pregnancy remains seemingly unresolved, with townspeople acknowledging only her temporary disappearance followed by a profound melancholy. Sweetie Fleetwood, exhausted from caring for her four profoundly disabled children, suddenly flees her house on foot and begins wordlessly trekking up the road to the Convent. On her way, she is met by Seneca, a stowaway on a passing truck who is moved to join Sweetie and shield her from the fierce cold. While reaching the convent with a delusional and hypothermic Sweetie, Seneca, a sensitive and traumatized young woman with a tendency to self-mutilate, reminisces on her own past. After she was abandoned by her elder sister, Jean (who, in truth, was actually her mother), Seneca grows up in a series of foster homes. Her boyfriend, Eddie, is incarcerated for vehicular homicide. Seneca then takes to hitchhiking, sex work, and eventually stowing away on different transport vehicles in pursuit of solitude and transience, but finds some comfort and stability in repeatedly returning to the Convent.

=== Divine ===
Reverend Pulliam delivers a sermon at K.D. and Arnette's wedding. The Convent women arrive uninvited at the reception, where their revealing clothing, dancing, and loud conversation offend other guests. Among them is Pallas, the and newest arrival, Pallas, who is nauseated and unable to speak.

Sixteen-year-old Pallas Truelove lives a spoiled, luxurious life in California with her wealthy father. She begins a romantic relationship with the school janitor, Carlos, and the two resolve to run off together and seek out Pallas’s absentee mother, artist Divine “DeeDee” Truelove. Carlos and DeeDee begin an affair, a distraught and betrayed Pallas runs away. She stumbles upon a group of young men who offer her a ride, only to rape her. Pallas is taken to a clinic after the attack where she is treated by Billie Delia, a former Ruby native who left the town some time before. Billie Delia recognizes Pallas’s distress, correctly surmising that she is pregnant, and brings Pallas to the Convent for help.

=== Patricia ===
Patricia “Pat” Best Cato, a widowed schoolteacher and Ruby native, lives with her widower father, Roger, an entrepreneur and mortician. The residents of Ruby distrust Roger for his morbid profession and for marrying Ruby’s late mother, Delia, who was light-skinned and not a Ruby native. Pat takes interest in tracing the genealogies of Ruby’s prominent families, first as an act of general public interest, then as personal obsession, much to the chagrin and resentment of the often secretive town’s residents. The people of Ruby also whisper about Pat’s supposedly promiscuous daughter, Billie Delia, who fled town after an argument with her mother turned violent.

Richard Misner, meanwhile, is troubled by the traditionalism and insularity of Ruby’s residents. At the town’s illustrious Christmas pageant, a thinly veiled tribute to the town’s founding families, Richard argues with Pat over the town’s future.

Interwoven through the chapter is the narrative of Haven’s original founding, as the families face hunger and the threat of violence while they migrate westward to Oklahoma.

=== Consolata ===
Consolata, or “Connie,” the oldest living member of the Convent, drinks alone in the cellar, thinking on the troubles faced by the younger girls at the Convent and reminiscing on her own past. A young orphan from a foreign country, she was brought to the Convent, then the Christ the King School for Native Girls, by the nun Mary Magna, who Consolata calls “mother.” Consolata remains fiercely devoted to the Convent and particularly to Mary Magna, and both remain even as the other residents dwindle. She forges complicated connections to several residents of Ruby; as a younger woman, she had a passionate affair with Deek Morgan before he breaks off the relationship. Soane Morgan, Deek’s wife, eventually appears at the Convent seeking out Consolata, leaving the latter unnerved. Consolata also forges a friendship with Lone DuPres, Ruby’s town midwife and wise woman, who instructs Consolata in spiritual works–including the raising of the dead–complicating the latter’s Catholic faith. While Consolata demonstrates increasingly potent supernatural abilities, she gradually goes blind. When Consolata utilizes her powers to revive Deek and Soane’s son, Scout, after a car accident, her friendship with Soane is solidified. It is also revealed that Arnette had secretly delivered her baby at the Convent, but the infant soon died.

In the present, Consolata grieves the death of Mary Magna, but eventually resolves to act as the new Mother to the Convent and embraces the healing capacity of her powers. Pallas gives birth to a son. Connie leads the Convent women in a sacred ritual to resolve their own traumas, freeing themselves from their pasts. In an act of joy and liberation, the women all shave their own heads, run out into the rain, and begin to dance.

=== Lone ===
Lone DuPres is Ruby’s aged and experienced midwife, wise and knowledgeable but now distrusted by Ruby’s residents who dismiss her in favor of hospital births. Her reputation is tarnished by her delivery of Fleetwoods' four disabled children, which Ruby’s increasingly paranoid families attribute to her relationship with the Convent’s women. Lone remains a sharp and astute observer of the town and its people, and is horrified to learn that Ruby’s men are planning to massacre the women of the Convent. Though she desperately tries to raise the alarm, she is too late to stop the men’s plan. The women of the Convent launch a valiant defense to save their lives, but are quickly overpowered; the men first fatally shoot “the white girl” (the novel never specifies which character this is) before Connie approaches both Morgan brothers. Deek is suddenly moved by his past love for her and briefly attempts to halt the attack, but Steward shoots Connie in the head, killing her, and irrevocably destroying his relationship with his brother.

The three remaining Convent women attempt to flee but are gunned down outside. Pallas’s baby is never found. The women of Ruby, and all other residents uninvolved in the massacre, are shocked and horrified by the carnage, fearing Ruby will now be damned both by white law enforcement and by God. When Roger Best later arrives with his hearse, all of the women’s bodies have mysteriously disappeared.

=== Save-Marie ===
Four months after the Convent massacre, the residents of Ruby attend the funeral of one of Jeff and Sweetie’s children. Save-Marie’s death–the third in all of Ruby’s history–causes many to believe Ruby’s unique safety and insularity has been destroyed by the murders. Numerous stories circulate through town over the actual events at the Convent, the uncertainty only amplified by the disappearance of the women's bodies. Deek Morgan confesses to Misner. Billie Delia reflects on her fondness for the Convent women and imagines, hopefully, that they will someday return and take vengeance on Ruby.

In an ambigious epilogue, the Convent women appear to various individuals from their pasts. Gigi visits her father, who sits on death row and has just been granted a state reprieve. Pallas, proudly holding her baby and a gleaming sword, walks past DeeDee, who is unable to call out to her. Mavis visits a now-grown Sal, going by Sally, and mother and daughter make amends. Seneca attends a concert, and cuts her hands on glass–Jean sees her, and gently tends to the cuts, healing them instantaneously. Consolata and Mary Magna are reunited on a beach, and the two sing together, embracing, gazing out towards the sea.

== Reception ==
Paradise received mixed-to-negative reviews upon its initial publication. New York Times book reviewer Michiko Kakutani criticized the book's pacing, style, and characters, describing it as a "clunky, leaden novel" and comparing it unfavorably to Morrison's previous works Beloved (1987) and Sula (1973). Adam Mars-Jones of The Guardian praised the novel's "richness and desolation" but also criticized its seemingly unfocused pacing and tone. Publishers Weekly gave a substantially more positive, albeit measured review, calling Paradise "another, if imperfect, triumph" for Morrison. Morrison acknowledged the criticism by admitting she wished she'd had more time between completing the manuscript and the novel's publication, but embraced that many readers and critics struggled with the challenges posed by her writing. Morrison further added that she had wanted to title the novel War, but was overridden by her editor.
