= The King (Anjimile album) =

Studio album by Anjimile
- Released: September 8, 2023
- Length: 33:15
- Label: 4AD
- Producer: Anjimile Chithambo; Justine Bowe; Shawn Everett

Anjimile chronology
Giver Taker (2020)	The King (2023)	You're Free to Go (2026)

Singles from The King
- 1. "The King" Released: May 23, 2023; 2. "Father" Released: June 29, 2023; 3. "Black Hole" Released: September 5, 2023

The King is the second studio album by American folk musician Anjimile Chithambo, better known as Anjimile. It was released on September 8, 2023, through 4AD. Chithambo wrote and co-produced all the songs, with additional production credits from Justine Bowe and Shawn Everett. It features contributions from Justine Bowe, Brad Allen Williams, Sam Gendel, and James Krivchenia.

== Background ==
Chithambo wrote, arranged, recorded, and produced the record in the span of three years. The musician described it as "a very intense record" that contains a lot of "anger and hopelessness and fear". In writing songs for the album, he was able to process and release "those challenging feelings", in hopes that listeners would experience it themselves. Spurred by the 2020 murder of George Floyd, Chithambo tried to find an outlet to release a pent up "well of anger roil inside", giving himself space to process the "myriad struggles they've faced as a Black nonbinary trans person".

Chithambo announced the album on May 23, 2023, alongside the release of the eponymous lead single. A "dramatic, unsettling, yet grand track", the song arrived with an animated lyric video by Daniela Yohannes, who also designed the album artwork. The musician explained in a statement that if his debut was "an album of prayers", then The King poses the antithesis as an album of "curses". Thematically, it explores the state of being a "black, trans person in America".

== Critical reception ==
Professional ratings
Aggregate scores
Source	Rating
Metacritic	84/100
Review scores
Source	Rating
Line of Best Fit	9/10
Paste	8.8/10
Pitchfork	7.5/10
Uncut	4/5 stars

At Metacritic, which assigns a normalized rating out of 100 to reviews from professional critics, the album received an average score of 84 based on six reviews, indicating "universal acclaim". Noah Barker of Line of Best Fit thought Chithambo crafted a "masterstroke folk album" where each track "is a watershed moment ceding itself the next". Paste's Natalie Marlin named The King "album of the week" in which the musician "upends his sound to craft a grand portrait of fiery rage and tender self-mythologizing".

Bhanuj Kappal of Pitchfork saw the album as "an invitation to feel deeply", where Chithambo tells the listener to accept one's suffering, "not run away from it". It would put the person at risk of letting the "unattended wounds" drag them "into the abyss". Contrary to their previous record, The King sheds away all the "bright and airy" moments from his sound, replacing it with an "atmosphere suffused with dread", alternating between "post-rock grandeur, sepulchral dirge, and sepia-tinged folk".

== Track listing ==
All tracks are written by Anjimile Chithambo.

The King track listing
No.	Title	Length
1.	"The King"	3:44
2.	"Mother"	3:02
3.	"Anybody"	2:27
4.	"Genesis"	2:58
5.	"Animal"	2:31
6.	"Father"	2:41
7.	"Harley"	3:38
8.	"Black Hole"	3:42
9.	"I Pray"	4:30
10.	"The Right"	4:02
Total length:		33:15
