= Beloved (novel) =

1987 novel by Toni Morrison

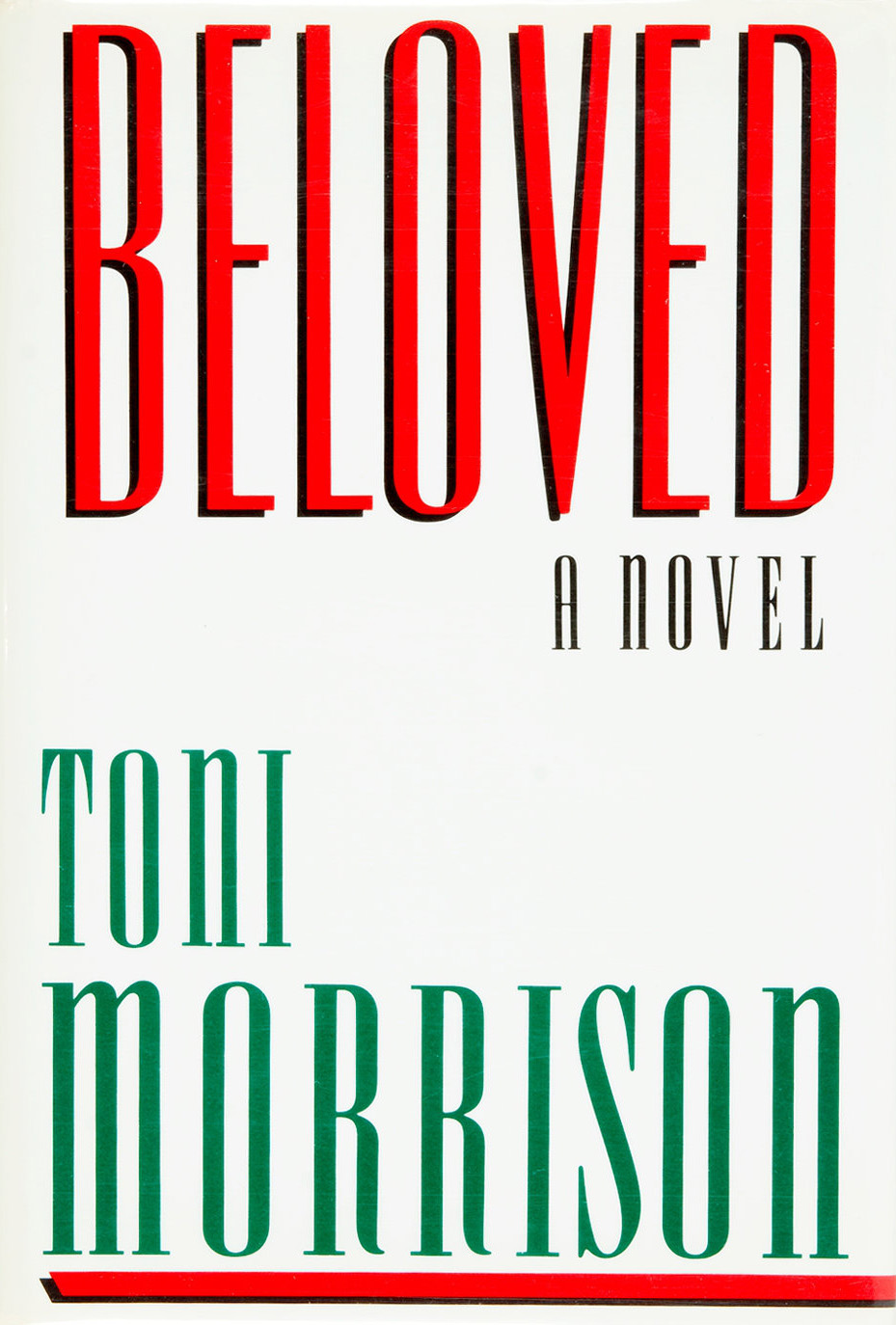
- First edition cover
- Author: Toni Morrison
- Language: English
- Publisher: Alfred A. Knopf
- Publication date: 16 September 1987
- Publication place: United States
- Pages: 324
- ISBN: 0394535979
- OCLC: 635065117
- Dewey Decimal: 813.54
- Preceded by: Tar Baby
- Followed by: Jazz

Beloved is a 1987 novel by American novelist Toni Morrison. Set in the period after the American Civil War, the novel tells the story of formerly enslaved people whose Cincinnati home is haunted by a malevolent spirit. Sethe, a formerly enslaved mother of four, grapples with her traumatic past. Morrison sought to depict the limitations that enslaved women faced and to present a physical manifestation that was lacking in the world of literature. Moreover, Beloved explores the interior life of the formerly enslaved.

The novel won the Pulitzer Prize for Fiction a year after its publication, and was a finalist for the 1987 National Book Award. A survey of writers and literary critics compiled by The New York Times ranked it as the best work of American fiction from 1981 to 2006. It was adapted as a 1998 movie of the same name, starring Oprah Winfrey.

== Background ==
The book's dedication reads "Sixty Million and more", referring to the Africans and their descendants who died as a result of the Atlantic slave trade. The book's epigraph is from Romans 9:25 (King James Bible): "I will call them my people, which were not my people; and her beloved, which was not beloved." In interviews, commentary, and the book’s foreword, Toni Morrison has described the image of Beloved’s introduction in the book as originating from an imaginative vision she had while at her boathouse on the Hudson River. The scene of a woman appearing as she walked out of the water, nice hat and all, is a scene she has described as an event that she actually “saw,” even though it was not a real event that happened in front of her. The inspiration of this scene, and how Morrison talks about it, reflects her intuitive approach as a storyteller, and contributes to the novel’s theme of blending memory and the supernatural.

=== Margaret Garner as inspiration ===
The narrative of Beloved is loosely derived from the life of Margaret Garner, who was born into slavery in Boone County, Kentucky, and later attempted to run away to Cincinnati, Ohio, in 1856. She is remembered for killing her daughter to protect her from the cruelty of slavery. Morrison uncovered the story of Garner in an 1856 newspaper article, "A Visit to the Slave Mother who Killed Her Child," initially published in the American Baptist. She discovered the newspaper article when working as an editor for The Black Book in 1974, a collection of texts on Black history and culture published by Random House. Morrison notably did not write a historical retelling; and there are many ways that Beloved diverges from Garner's story.

In January 1856, Garner fled Maplewood Farm in Richwood, Kentucky, alongside her husband, his parents, and their four children in hopes of attaining freedom from slavery in Cincinnati. After fleeing, they were subject to capture under the Fugitive Slave Act of 1850. The group first travelled by horse to Covington, Kentucky before continuing on foot to the home of their free relatives, the Kites, in Cincinnati. The family planned to proceed to Canada through the Underground Railroad. However, they were found at the Kites' home by their enslaver, Archibald Gaines, and U.S. marshals. As law enforcement broke into the home, Garner attempted to kill her children, hoping to spare them from being returned to slavery. Before being caught, she succeeded in killing her two-year-old daughter, Mary, with a butcher knife. The family was then captured and re-enslaved. Gaining national attention, the public debated whether Garner should be charged with murder or destruction of property.

== Plot summary ==
Beloved begins in 1873 in Cincinnati, Ohio, with Sethe, (Note: Pronounced /ˈsɛθə/ SETH-ə.) a formerly enslaved woman, and her 18-year-old daughter, Denver, who live at 124 Bluestone Road. The site has been haunted for years by what they believe is the ghost of Sethe's youngest daughter. Denver is shy, friendless, and housebound. Sethe's sons, Howard and Buglar, ran away from home by the age of 13, which she believes was due to the ghost. Baby Suggs, the mother of Sethe's husband, Halle, died soon after the boys fled, eight years before the start of the novel.

One day, Paul D, one of the formerly enslaved men from Sweet Home, the plantation where Sethe, Halle, Baby Suggs, and several others were once enslaved, arrives at Sethe's home. He forces out the spirit, receiving Denver's contempt for driving away her only companion, but persuades them to leave the house together for the first time in years for a carnival. Upon returning home, they find a young woman sitting in front of the house who calls herself Beloved. Paul D is suspicious and warns Sethe, but she is charmed by the young woman and ignores him. Denver is eager to care for the sickly Beloved, who she begins to believe is her elder sister come back.

Paul D begins to feel increasingly uncomfortable in the house and that he is being driven out. One night, Paul D is cornered by Beloved, who tells him to touch her on her "inside part." While they have sex, his mind is filled with horrific memories from his past, including the sexual violence inflicted upon him and the other men while in a chain gang. Paul D tries to tell Sethe about it, but cannot. Instead, he says that he wants her pregnant. Sethe is afraid to have to live for a baby. When Paul D tells friends at work about his plans to start a new family, they react fearfully. One, Stamp Paid, reveals the reason for the community's rejection of Sethe by showing Paul D a newspaper clipping of an article about a fugitive woman who killed her child.

Paul D confronts Sethe, who tells him that after escaping and joining her children at 124, four horsemen came to return her children and her to a life of slavery. Sethe, terrified of returning to Sweet Home and its vicious manager Schoolteacher, ran to the woodshed with her children to kill them, but only managed to kill her younger infant daughter. Sethe says that she was "trying to put my babies where they would be safe". Paul D leaves, telling her her love is "too thick" and chastising that "you've got two feet, not four." Sethe retorts that "thin love is no love", adamant that she did the right thing.

Sethe comes to believe that Beloved is the daughter she had killed, as "BELOVED" was all she could afford to have engraved on her tombstone. She is overjoyed, holding onto a hope that Halle and her sons will come back and they will all be a family together. Out of guilt, she begins to spend all of her time and money on Beloved to please her and try to explain her actions, and loses her job. Beloved becomes angry and demanding, throwing tantrums when she does not get her way. Beloved's presence consumes Sethe's life. She hardly eats, while Beloved grows bigger and bigger, eventually taking the form of a pregnant woman. Denver reveals her fear of Sethe, having known that she killed Beloved, but not having understood why, and that her brothers shared this fear and ran away due to it. Sethe and Beloved's voices merge until indistinguishable, and Denver observes that Sethe becomes more like a child, while Beloved seems more like the mother.

Denver reaches out to the Black community for help, from whom they had been isolated because of envy of Baby Suggs' privilege and horror at Sethe killing her two-year-old daughter. Local women come to the house to exorcise Beloved. At the same time, their White landlord, Mr. Bodwin, arrives to pick up Denver for her first night-shift as a companion in his house. Not knowing this, Sethe attacks him with an ice pick, thinking he was Schoolteacher coming back for her daughter. The village women and Denver hold her back and Beloved disappears.

Denver becomes a working member of the community, and Paul D returns to a bed-ridden Sethe, who, devastated at Beloved's disappearance, remorsefully tells him that Beloved was her "best thing". He replies that Sethe is her own "best thing", leaving her questioning, "Me? Me?" As time goes on, those who knew Beloved gradually forget her until all traces of her are gone.

== Major themes ==
=== Mother-daughter relationships ===
The maternal bonds between Sethe and her children inhibit her own individuation and prevent the development of her self. Sethe develops a dangerous maternal passion that results in killing one daughter, her own "best self." Her surviving daughter becomes estranged from the Black community. Both outcomes result from Sethe trying to salvage her "fantasy of the future," her children, from a life in slavery.

In Ohio, Sethe fails to recognize her daughter Denver's need for interaction with the Black community to enter into womanhood. At the end of the novel, Denver succeeds in establishing her own self and embarking on her individuation with the help of Beloved. Sethe only becomes individuated after Beloved's exorcism. Then, she is free to fully accept the first relationship that is completely "for her," her relationship with Paul D. This relationship relieves her from the self-destruction she was causing based on her maternal bonds with her children.

Beloved and Sethe are both emotionally impaired, which comes from Sethe having been enslaved. Under slavery, mothers lost their children, with devastating consequences for both. Baby Suggs dealt with this by refusing to become close with her children and remembering what she could of them, but Sethe tried to hold onto them and fight for them, to the point of killing them so they could be free. Sethe was traumatized by having had her milk stolen, unable to form the symbolic bond between herself and her daughter by feeding her.

=== Psychological effects of slavery ===
Because of the suffering under slavery, most former slaves tried to repress these memories in an attempt to forget the past. This repression and dissociation from the past causes a fragmentation of the self and a loss of true identity. Sethe, Paul D., and Denver all suffered a loss of self, which could only be remedied when they were able to reconcile their pasts and memories of earlier identities. Beloved serves to remind these characters of their repressed memories, eventually leading to the reintegration of their selves.

Slavery splits a person into a fragmented figure. The identity, consisting of painful memories and unspeakable past, denied and kept at bay, becomes a "self that is no self". To heal and humanize, one must constitute it in a language, reorganize the painful events, and retell the painful memories. As a result of suffering, the "self" becomes subject to a violent practice of making and unmaking, once acknowledged by an audience becomes real. Sethe, Paul D, and Baby Suggs, who all fall short of such realization, are unable to remake themselves by trying to keep their pasts at bay. The "self" is located in a word, defined by others. The power lies in the audience, or more precisely, in the word—once the word changes, so does the identity. All of the characters in Beloved face the challenge of an unmade self, composed of their "rememories" and defined by perceptions and language. The barrier that keeps them from remaking of the self is the desire for an "uncomplicated past" and the fear that remembering will lead them to "a place they couldn't get back from".

=== Definition of manhood ===
The discussion of manhood and masculinity is foreshadowed by the dominant meaning of Sethe's story. Beloved depicts slavery in two main emotions: Love and Self-Preservation; however, Morrison does more than depict emotions.

The author accurately depicts the horrors of enslavement and its effects to communicate the morals of manhood. It also distorts a man from himself. Morrison revealed different pathways to the meaning of manhood by her stylistic devices. She established new information for understanding the legacy of slavery best depicted through stylistic devices. To understand Paul D's perception of manhood, Morrison deliberately inserts his half-formed words and thoughts, to provide the audience a taste of what is going on inside his mind. Yet, throughout the novel, Paul D's depiction of manhood was being constantly challenged by the norms and values of white culture. The author demonstrates the distinctions between Western and African values, and how the dialogue between the two values is heard through juxtaposition and allusions. Scholar Zakiyyah Iman Jackson has argued that Paul D's reduced manhood emerges in relation to a discourse of animality. Morrison maneuvered her message through the social atmosphere of her words, which was further highlighted by the character's motives and actions.

Paul D is a victim of racism in that his dreams and goals are so high that he will never be able to achieve them because of racism. He thought he earned his right to reach each of his goals because of his sacrifices and what he has been through, that society would pay him back and allow him to do what his heart desired.

After Reconstruction (1890–1910)

During the Reconstruction era, Jim Crow laws were put in place to limit the movement and involvement of African Americans in the White-dominant society. Black men during this time had to establish their own identity, which may seem impossible due to all the limitations put upon them. Many Black men, like Paul D, struggled to find their meaning in their society and achieving their goals because of the "disabilities" that constrained them to a certain part of the social hierarchy.

In Beloved, Stamp Paid observes Paul D sitting on the base of the church steps "... liquor bottle in hand, stripped of the very maleness that enables him to caress and love the wounded Sethe..." (132). Throughout the novel, Paul D is sitting on a base of some sort or a foundation like a tree stub or the steps, for instance. This exemplifies his place in society. Black men are the foundation of society because without their hard labor, the white men would not profit. They were coerced into the society where they were deemed "lower-status" because of the color of their skin.

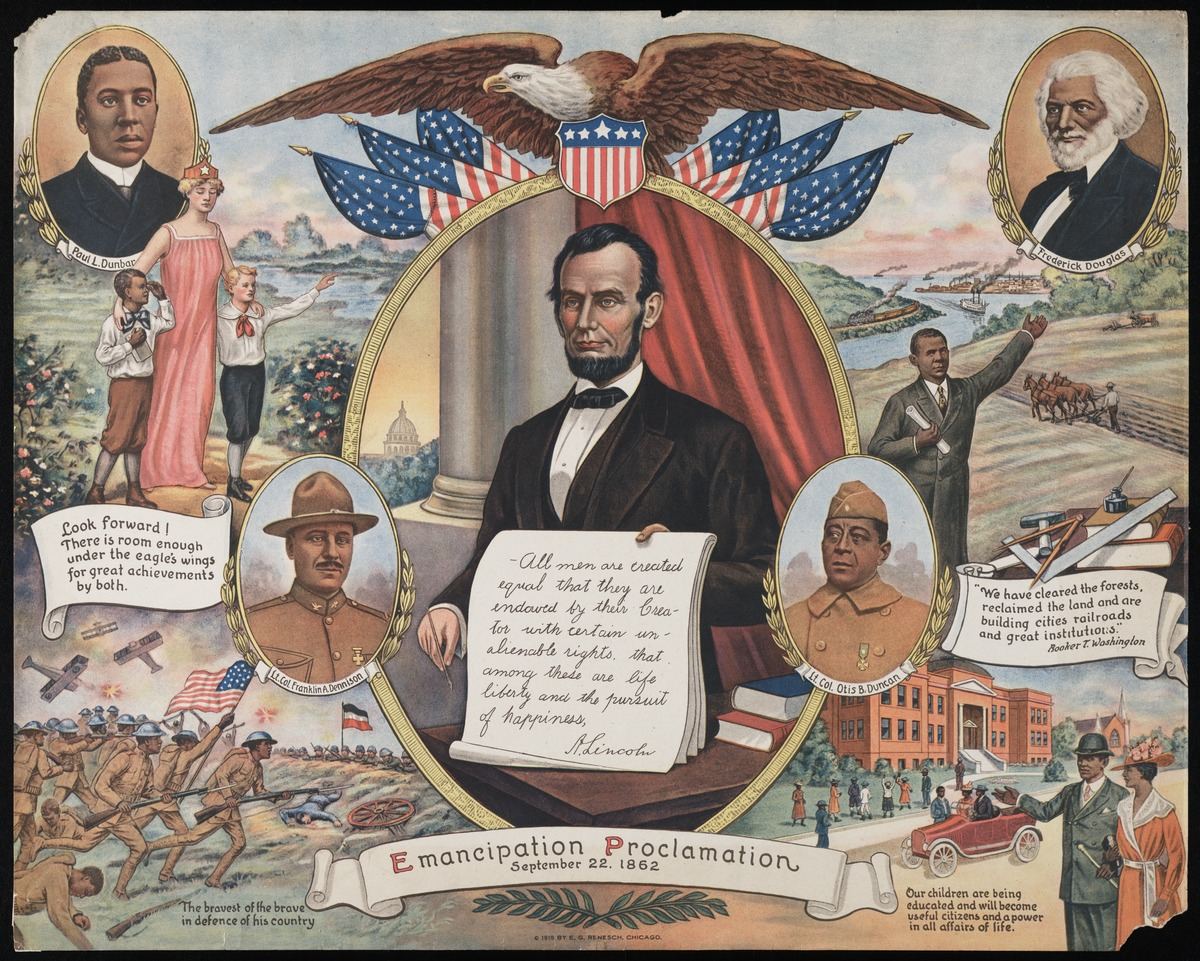
This print visualizes the Emancipation Proclamation.

=== Family relationships ===
Family relationships are an instrumental element of Beloved, which help visualize the stress and the dismantlement of African-American families in this era. The slavery system did not allow African Americans to have rights to themselves, their family, their belongings, or their children. So, Sethe killing Beloved was deemed a peaceful act because Sethe believed that killing her daughter was saving her. By doing this, their family is divided and fragmented, much like the time in which they were living. After the Emancipation Proclamation was signed, formerly enslaved families were broken and bruised because of the hardships they faced while they were enslaved.

Since enslaved people could not participate in societal events, they put their faith and trust in the supernatural. They performed rituals and prayed to their god or multiple gods.

In the novel, Beloved, who was murdered at the hands of her mother Sethe, haunts Sethe. For example, Sethe, Denver, and Paul D go to the neighborhood carnival, which happens to be Sethe's first social outing since killing her daughter. When they return home, Beloved appears at the house. Throughout the novel, Sethe believes that the person claiming to be Beloved is her daughter that she killed 18 years prior - a scenario that shows how [fractured] family relationships are used to display the mental strife the protagonist faces.

=== Pain ===
The pain throughout this novel is universal because everyone involved in slavery was heavily scarred, whether that be physically, mentally, sociologically, or psychologically. Some of the characters tend to "romanticize" their pain, in a way that each experience is a turning point in one's life. This concept is played throughout history in early Christian contemplative tradition and African-American blues tradition.

Beloved is a book of the systematic torture that people who had been enslaved had to deal with after the Emancipation Proclamation. Therefore, in this novel, the narrative is like a complex labyrinth because all the characters have been "stripped away" from their voices, their narratives, their language in a way that their sense of self is diminished. Also, all the characters have had different experiences with slavery, which is why their stories and their narratives are distinct from each other.

In addition to the pain, many major characters try to beautify pain in a way that diminishes what was done. For example, Sethe keeps repeating what a White girl said about her scars on her back, calling them "a Choke-cherry tree. Trunk, branches, and even leaves". She repeats this to everyone, suggesting she is trying to find the beauty in her scar, even when they caused her extreme pain. Paul D and Baby Suggs both look away in disgust and deny this description of Sethe's scars. Sethe does the same with Beloved. The memory of her ghost-like daughter plays a role of memory, grief, and spite that separates Sethe and her late daughter. For instance, Beloved stays in the house with Paul D and Sethe. A home is a place of vulnerability, where the heart lies. Paul D and Baby Suggs both suggest that Beloved is not invited into the home, but Sethe says otherwise because she sees Beloved, all grown and alive, instead of the pain of when Sethe murdered her. At the end of the book, Beloved is gone and Paul D encourages Sethe to love herself instead.

=== Heroism ===
Per her definition of heroism as the ability to do what one deems right in the face of opposition and to inspire others to escape the pain of their past, the book may be trying to convey that societally, heroism is not absolute but, rather, relative to past experience and the influence of the community; the literary characterization of Sethe and Denver are written in a way that further support this.

Developing Sethe not as a conventional hero but as an individual capable of allowing those she cares for to break from the shackles of the past, Morrison depicts Sethe as a certain definition of heroism. Sethe's decision to kill her own child, Beloved, is thoroughly scorned by the community, despite her fear that Schoolteacher is coming to take her family back into slavery. Yet Sethe herself never doubts her own veracity, justifying, "It ain't my job to know what's worse. It's my job to know what is and to keep them away from what I know is terrible. I did that" (194). Sethe contrasts the role society proclaims for her, to refrain from murdering her children and try to deal with the problem of Schoolteacher's arrival peacefully, and the role she assumes for herself, to kill her children to ensure that they will not be forced to experience the same venomous anguish of life as an enslaved person. From Sethe's point of view, the only method that would have resulted in the complete safety of her children was to kill her children and "keep them away from what [she] know[s] is terrible," because death is far more preferable to life back in the confines of slavery. Beyond just having the courage to stand up for what she believes in, Sethe also demonstrates her heroism by helping Paul D deal with his own painful past. When he visits Sethe near the end of the novel, Paul D reminisces about "Her tenderness about his neck jewelry — its three wands, like attentive baby rattlers, curving two feet into the air. How she never mentioned or looked at it, so he did not have to feel the shame of being collared like a beast. Only this woman Sethe could have left him his manhood like that. He wants to put his story next to hers" (322). Paul D's intimate experiences with the iron bit have changed him forever, stripping him of his masculinity and contributing to a deep mental storm tormenting him from within. Morrison utilizes metaphor to compare the iron bit to "three wands, like attentive baby rattlers, curving two feet into the air," underscoring that the venomous influence of the iron bit, much like the bite of a rattlesnake, strikes in three different ways, damaging physical, cognitive, and emotional abilities. Paul D draws support from Sethe "never mention[ing] or look[ing]" at his scars, but more so, this allows him to retain his own manhood, which to Paul D defines the very basis of his character.

Although Sethe defies opposition to her heroic acts of freeing others from their past, Denver defies the confinements of her past, allowing her to help Sethe escape Beloved's parasitism that keeps her from a livable life and foreseeable future. Feeling trapped by her isolation at 124 Bluestone Road, Denver is challenged by the concept of leaving Sethe and Beloved behind, needing the courage to set foot beyond the house to seek the aid of the community she was once a part of. As Sethe and Beloved remained trapped in the house, the tipping point of heroism for Denver comes when she realizes "neither Beloved nor Sethe seemed to care what the next day might bring. Denver knew it was on her. She would have to leave the yard; step off the edge of the world, leave the two behind and go ask somebody for help" (286). By using the metaphorical image of Denver "step[ing] off the edge of the world," to describe Denver leaving "the yard" in an effort to rewrite society's conceptions of her isolation and Sethe's horrible past actions, Morrison elucidates her courage to leave the only world she knows to "ask somebody for help." Also realizing that Sethe and Beloved did not "seem to care what the next day might bring," Denver recognizes that she must free her mother from the past's reach to encourage her to plan for the "next day" and for a future beyond Beloved's grasp. Overcoming her preconceptions of the outside community allows Denver to surpass Morrison's threshold of heroism, rescuing Sethe from the suppressive grip of the past through Beloved. When Beloved's influence becomes more and more detrimental to the environment of 124 Bluestone Road and Sethe's outlook on life, Denver does not hesitate to thrust herself into a motherly role and care for her mother. Her actions inspire Ella to form a group of women to exorcise Beloved from the community, and she describes, "For Sethe it was as though the Clearing had come to her with all its heat and simmering leaves, where the voices of women searched for the right combination, the key the code, the sound that broke the back of words. Building voice upon voice until they found it, and when they did it was a wave of sound wide enough to sound deep water and knock the pods off chestnut trees. It broke over Sethe and she trembled like the baptized in its wash" (308). Morrison refers back to the image of the Clearing to highlight how Denver has assumed the positive role of Baby Suggs in the community, supporting and inspiring the people of the community to work towards the greater good. Morrison then compares the voices of the praying woman to a wave of sound that could even "knock the pods off chestnut trees," highlighting the complete extent of power a united community truly holds. In the wake of this spiritually pure experience, Sethe "tremble[s] like the baptized," showcasing how she has been, to some extent, cleansed of the taint of Beloved by Denver's courageous actions.

Through her characterization of both Sethe and Denver as unlikely heroes capable of surpassing adversities in order to help their loved ones escape the haunting of their past, Morrison may be emphasizing that heroism is defined not by supernatural powers or acts of unparalleled valor, but by the courageous intent to overcome the assertive preconceptions of society in order to ensure the greater good and positively influence on others in the process. As her experience in slavery came to define her life as a free woman, Sethe wallowed in her past, becoming a hero only when she allowed those she loved to escape their own burdens from the de-humanizing effects of slavery. Denver, on the other hand, breaks free of her past isolation in order to help Sethe seek a future beyond the constraints of her past. Morrison highlights that individuals have the ability to act with heroism, choosing to bring others out of the desolation of their past burden. Such a phenomenon can be enacted in current society by resisting the ideals of society, but rather, standing up for own beliefs to find heroism in the face of great opposition.

== Major characters ==
=== Sethe ===
Sethe is the protagonist of the novel. She escaped slavery from a plantation called Sweet Home. She lives in the house named 124 (a house on 124 Bluestone Rd., but referred to only as "124") which is believed to be haunted because she killed her infant child there. Her two sons have fled because of the haunting, and she resides in the house with her daughter Denver. She is motherly and will do anything to protect her children from suffering the same abuses she experienced when she was enslaved. She is greatly influenced by her repression of the trauma she endured. She lives with "a tree on her back", scars from being whipped. Her character is resilient, yet defined by her traumatic past. She was 19 years old when Denver was born, making her birth year to be 1836.

=== Beloved ===
The opaque understanding of Beloved is central to the novel. She is a young woman who mysteriously appears from a body of water near Sethe's house, and is discovered soaking wet on the doorstep by Sethe, Paul D, and Denver, on their return from visiting the fair; they take her in. She is widely believed to be the murdered baby who haunted 124, as the haunting ends when she arrives, and in many ways she behaves like a child. As also mentioned, a young woman enslaved by a White man nearby had escaped, and Beloved recounts stories of past slaves, including Sethe's mother. Morrison stated that the character Beloved is the daughter who Sethe killed. The murdered baby was unnamed, so her name is derived from the engraving on Sethe's murdered baby's tombstone, which simply read "Beloved" because Sethe could not afford to engrave the word "Dearly" or anything else. Beloved becomes a catalyst to bring repressed trauma of the family to the surface, but also creates madness in the house and slowly depletes Sethe.

=== Paul D ===
Paul D retains his name from enslavement; most of the enslaved men at Sweet Home were named Paul. He also retains many painful memories from enslavement and being forced to live in a chain gang; he had been moving around continuously before arriving at 124. He has a "tobacco tin" for a heart, in which he contains his painful memories, until Beloved opens it. Years after their time together at Sweet Home, Paul D and Sethe reunite and begin a romantic relationship. He acts fatherly towards Denver and is the first to be suspicious of Beloved. Despite their long past, he fails to understand Sethe fully because of her motherhood and because of the many years that had passed since.

=== Denver ===
Denver is Sethe's only child who remains at 124. Isolated from her community after Beloved's killing, Denver forms a close bond with her mother. Upon Beloved's arrival, Denver watches as her sister's ghost begins to exhibit demonic activity. Although introduced as a childish character, Denver develops into a protective woman throughout the novel. In the final chapters, Denver fights not only for her personal independence, but also for her mother's wellbeing, breaking the cycle of isolation at 124. She is 18 years old at the beginning of the novel.

=== Baby Suggs ===
Baby Suggs is Sethe's mother-in-law. Her son Halle worked to buy her freedom, after which she travels to Cincinnati and establishes herself as a respected leader in the community, preaching for the Black people to love themselves because other people will not. This respect turns sour after she turns some food into a feast, earning their envy, as well as Sethe's act of infanticide. Baby Suggs retires to her bed, where she thinks about pretty colors for the rest of her life. She dies at 70 in the beginning of the book, 8 years before the main events.

=== Halle ===
Halle is the son of Baby Suggs, the husband of Sethe and father of her children. Sethe and he were married in Sweet Home, yet they got separated during her escape. He is only mentioned in flashbacks. Paul D was the last to see Halle, churning butter at Sweet Home. He is presumed to have gone mad after seeing residents of Sweet Home violating Sethe. He is hardworking and good, qualities that Paul D sees in Denver at the end of the book, but ones that Baby Suggs fears make him a target.

=== Schoolteacher ===
Schoolteacher is the primary discipliner, violent, abusive, and cruel to the people he enslaved at Sweet Home, whom he views as animals. He comes for Sethe following her escape, but she kills her daughter and is arrested, instead.

=== Amy Denver ===
Amy Denver is a young white girl who finds Sethe desperately trying to make her way to safety after her escape from Sweet Home, trying to get to Boston herself. Sethe is extremely pregnant at the time, and her feet are bleeding badly from the travel. Amy helps nurture her and deliver Sethe's daughter on a small boat, and Sethe names the child Denver after her.

== Adaptations ==
In 1998, the novel was made into a film directed by Jonathan Demme, and produced by and starring Oprah Winfrey.

In January 2016, Beloved was broadcast in 10 episodes by BBC Radio 4 as part of its 15 Minute Drama programme. The radio series was adapted by Patricia Cumper.

== Legacy ==
Beloved received the Frederic G. Melcher Book Award, which is named for an editor of Publishers Weekly. In accepting the award on October 12, 1988, Morrison said that "[t]here is no suitable memorial or plaque or wreath or wall or park or skyscraper lobby" honoring the memory of the human beings forced into slavery and brought to the United States. "There's no small bench by the road," she continued. "And because such a place doesn't exist (that I know of), the book had to." Inspired by her remarks, the Toni Morrison Society began to install benches at significant sites in the history of slavery in America. The New York Times reported that the first 'bench by the road' was dedicated on July 26, 2008, on Sullivan's Island, South Carolina, the place of entry for some 40% of the enslaved Africans brought to the United States. Morrison said she was extremely moved by the memorial. In 2017, the 21st bench was placed at the Library of Congress. It is dedicated to Daniel Alexander Payne Murray (1852–1925), the first African-American assistant librarian of Congress.

The novel received the seventh annual Robert F. Kennedy Center for Justice and Human Rights Book Award in 1988, given to a novelist who "most faithfully and forcefully reflects Robert Kennedy's purposes—his concern for the poor and the powerless, his struggle for honest and even-handed justice, his conviction that a decent society must assure all young people a fair chance, and his faith that a free democracy can act to remedy disparities of power and opportunity."

=== Critical reception ===
The publication of Beloved in 1987 resulted in the greatest acclaim yet for Morrison. Although nominated for the National Book Award for Fiction, it surprisingly lost to Paco's Story, and 48 African-American writers and critics—including Maya Angelou, Amiri Baraka, Jayne Cortez, Angela Davis, Ernest J. Gaines, Henry Louis Gates Jr., Rosa Guy, June Jordan, Paule Marshall, Louise Meriwether, Eugene Redmond, Sonia Sanchez, Quincy Troupe, John Edgar Wideman, and John A. Williams—signed a letter of protest that was published in The New York Times Book Review on January 24, 1988. Yet, later in 1988, Beloved did receive the Pulitzer Prize for Fiction, as well as the Robert F. Kennedy Memorial Book Award, the Melcher Book Award, the Lyndhurst Foundation Award, and the Elmer Holmes Bobst Award.

Commentators have described Beloved as an exploration of notions of family, trauma, the repression of memory, the restoration of the historical record and an attempt to give voice to the collective memory of African Americans. Indeed, critics and Morrison herself have indicated that the controversial epigraph to Beloved, "60 million and more", is drawn from a number of studies on the African slave trade, which estimate that approximately half of each ship's "cargo" perished in transit to America.

Scholars have debated the nature of the character Beloved, arguing whether she is actually a ghost, a vampire, a zombie, or a reincarnation. Reviewers, assuming Beloved to be a supernatural incarnation of Sethe's daughter, have faulted Beloved as a confusing ghost story; Elizabeth B. House, however, has argued that Beloved is not a ghost, and the novel is actually a story of two probable instances of mistaken identity. Beloved is haunted by the loss of her African parents, and thus comes to believe that Sethe is her mother. Sethe longs for her dead daughter and is rather easily convinced that Beloved is the child she has lost. Such an interpretation, House contends, clears up many puzzling aspects of the novel and emphasizes Morrison's concern with familial ties.

Since the late 1970s, the focus on Morrison's representation of African-American experience and history has been strong. The idea that writing acts as a means of healing or recovery is a strain in many of these studies. Timothy Powell, for instance, argues that Morrison's recovery of a Black logos rewrites blackness as "affirmation, presence, and good", while Theodore O. Mason Jr. suggests that Morrison's stories unite communities.

Many critics explore memory, or what Beloved's Sethe calls "rememory", in this light. Susan Bowers places Morrison in a "long tradition of African American apocalyptic writing" that looks back in time, "unveiling" the horrors of the past in order to "transform" them. Several critics have interpreted Morrison's representations of trauma and memory through a psychoanalytic framework. Ashraf H. A. Rushdy explores how primal scenes in Morrison's novels are "an opportunity and affective agency for self-discovery through memory" and "rememory". As Jill Matus argues, however, Morrison's representations of trauma are "never simply curative": in raising the ghosts of the past to banish or memorialize them, the texts potentially "provoke readers to the vicarious experience of trauma and act as a means of transmission". Ann Snitow's reaction to Beloved neatly illustrates how Morrison criticism began to evolve and move toward new modes of interpretation. In her 1987 review of Beloved, Snitow argues that Beloved, the ghost at the center of the narrative, is "too light" and "hollow", rendering the entire novel "airless". Snitow changed her position after reading criticism that interpreted Beloved in a different way, seeing something more complicated and burdened than a literal ghost, something requiring different forms of creative expression and critical interpretation. The conflicts at work here are ideological, as well as critical; they concern the definition and evaluation of American and African-American literature, the relationship between art and politics, and the tension between recognition and appropriation.

In defining Morrison's texts as African-American literature, critics have become more attentive to historical and social context and to the way Morrison's fiction engages with specific places and moments in time. As Jennings observes, many of Morrison's novels are set in isolated Black communities where African practices and belief systems are not marginalized by a dominant White culture, but rather remain active, if perhaps subconscious, forces shaping the community. Matus comments that Morrison's later novels "have been even more thoroughly focused on specific historical moments"; "through their engagement with the history of slavery and early twentieth-century Harlem, [they] have imagined and memorialized aspects of black history that have been forgotten or inadequately remembered".

On November 5, 2019, the BBC News listed Beloved on its list of the 100 most inspiring novels.

In 2026, a Guardian poll of more than 170 novelists, critics, and academics ranked Beloved as the second greatest English-language novel of all time.

=== Banning and controversy ===
Beloved has been banned in many U.S. schools, including at least eleven during the 2021–2022 academic year. Common reasons for censorship include bestiality, infanticide, sex, and violence.

In 2007, twenty years after its 1987 publication, the novel was abruptly abandoned by an AP English class at Eastern High School in Louisville, Kentucky, at the order of the school's principal. The class had nearly reached the end of the book when a parent complained about language on page 13. Upon being informed that the book was being immediately banned, the English teacher who was teaching the book argued to the school's Site Based Decision Making Council that a college-level English literature course should be taught. With the help of like-minded teachers and an outpouring from Eastern's alumni, the ban was soon lifted, and the book continues to be taught at the high school today.

In Virginia, Beloved was considered for removal from the Fairfax County senior English reading list due to a parent's 2017 complaint that "the book includes scenes of violent sex, including a gang rape, and was too graphic and extreme for teenagers". Parental concern about Beloved's content inspired the Beloved Bill, legislation that would have required Virginia public schools to notify parents of any "sexually explicit content" and provide an alternative assignment if requested. The bill was vetoed by Governor Terry McAuliffe. When McAuliffe ran again for the governor's office in 2021, a major event in the election was his statement during a debate that, "Yeah, I stopped the bill that—I don't think parents should be telling schools what they should teach." His opponent, Glenn Youngkin, seized on the remark, and produced a television commercial in which a parent recounted her effort to get the book banned. The commercial did not mention the title, author, or subject of the book, but focused on the "explicit material" in the unnamed work.

Student activist group Voters of Tomorrow announced plans in February 2022 to distribute banned books to students in Texas and Virginia, including Beloved. Parents in the Katy Independent School District responded to the book distributions by filing a request to review Beloved, resulting in the book's removal from school libraries and restriction to 11th and 12th Grade students. Students and parents spoke against banning the book during the public forum segment of the district's board meetings. The ACLU of Texas delivered a letter to school board members and the superintendent in April 2022 claiming that the district's book removal of Beloved and other titles violated the First Amendment, the Texas Constitution, and the district's own policies.

=== Trilogy ===
Beloved is the first of three novels about love and African-American history, sometimes called the Beloved Trilogy. Morrison said they are intended to be read together, explaining: "The conceptual connection is the search for the beloved – the part of the self that is you, and loves you, and is always there for you." The second novel in the trilogy, Jazz, came out in 1992. The third novel Paradise, about citizens of an all-Black town, came out in 1997.

== Awards ==
- Pulitzer Prize for Fiction, 1988
- Anisfield-Wolf Book Award, 1988
- Robert F. Kennedy Memorial Book Award
- Melcher Book Award
- Lyndhurst Foundation Award
- Elmer Holmes Bobst Award
