= Jazz (novel) =

1992 novel by Toni Morrison

- First edition cover
- Author: Toni Morrison
- Language: English
- Genre: Historical novel
- Publisher: Alfred A. Knopf Inc.
- Publication date: April 21, 1992
- Publication place: United States
- Media type: Print (hardback & paperback)
- Pages: 256
- ISBN: 0-679-41167-4
- Preceded by: Beloved
- Followed by: Paradise

Jazz is a 1992 historical novel by Pulitzer and Nobel Prize-winning American author Toni Morrison. The majority of the narrative takes place in Harlem during the 1920s; however, as the pasts of the various characters are explored, the narrative extends back to the mid-19th-century American South.

The novel forms the second part of Morrison's trilogy on African-American history, beginning with Beloved (1987) and ending with Paradise (1998). Jazz was Morrison’s most recently published work when she was awarded the 1993 Nobel Prize for Literature.

== Background ==
Morrison spent three years researching and reading historical records of the Harlem Renaissance such as "issues of every 'Colored' newspaper" for the year 1926. Morrison has stated that she considers Jazz her best novel.

== Characters ==
- Joe Trace, a door-to-door cosmetics salesman and the murderer of his young lover.
- Violet Trace, an unlicensed beautician. Violet is married to Joe. She is nicknamed "Violent" because she assaulted the corpse of Joe’s lover with a knife at the funeral.
- Dorcas, Joe's young lover, who is shot down at a party. Dorcas is inspired by a picture from The Harlem Book of the Dead, a collection of funeral photographs by James Van Der Zee.
- Alice Manfred, Dorcas's aunt and guardian. A conservative Christian ashamed by her niece's behavior. Alice enters into an unusual friendship with Violet.
- Felice, a friend of Dorcas who goes to the Trace household in search of answers.
- Golden Gray, a mixed-race man from the 19th century. Golden appears in both Joe's and Violet's histories.

== Critical reception ==
A year after the release of Jazz Morrison was awarded the Nobel Prize for Literature. The official press release states that in the novel, "Morrison uses a device which is akin to the way jazz itself is played… The result is a richly complex, sensuously conveyed image of the events, the characters and moods."
