= Soul Glo =

American hardcore punk band

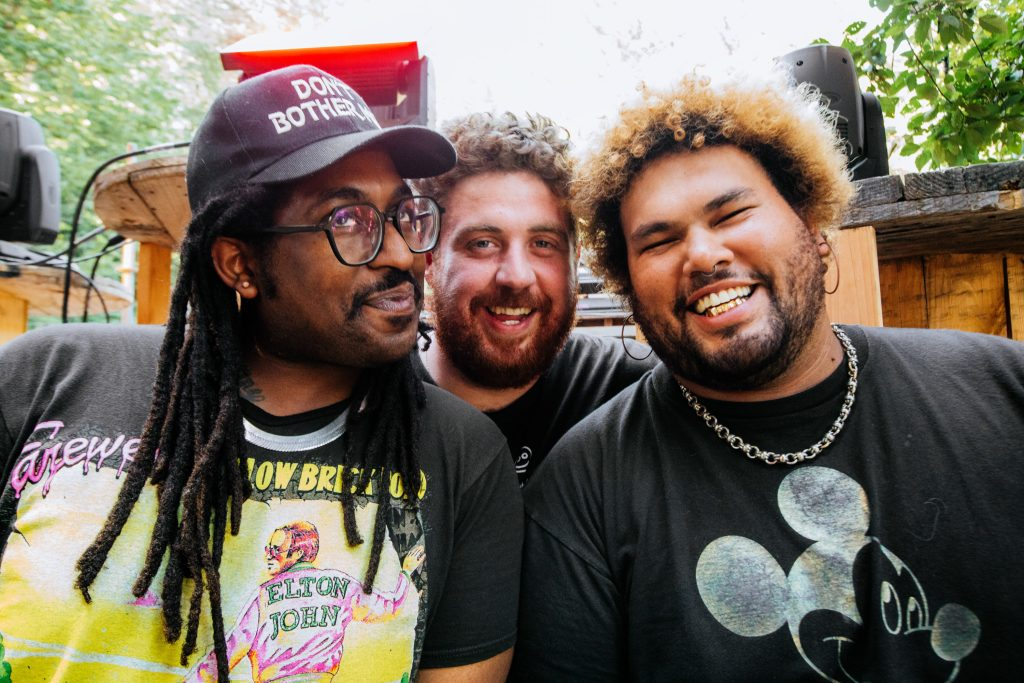
- L–R: Pierce Jordan, TJ Stevenson, GG Guerra

Background information
- Origin: Philadelphia, US
- Genres: Hardcore punk; punk rock; rap rock; punk rap
- Years active: 2014–present
- Label: Epitaph
- Members: Pierce Jordan; TJ Stevenson
- Past members: Ruben Polo; Jamie Sokol; Ethan Brennan; GG Guerra
- Website: soulglophl.com

Soul Glo is an American hardcore punk band formed in 2014 in Philadelphia, Pennsylvania. It is composed of Pierce Jordan (vocals), and TJ Stevenson (drums).

== History ==
The band was originally a quartet featuring Pierce Jordan, Jamie Sokol, Ethan Brennan and Ruben Polo. In December 2016, the band supported Old Gray on a Northeast US weekend tour, including a Brooklyn show with support from Nine of Swords and a Boston show with support from Really From. In 2018, while the band was on tour, GG Guerra was arrested by the Missouri State Highway Patrol while on their way to a show in St. Louis, causing the band to fundraise $15,000 to bail him out.

In 2021, the band signed to Epitaph Records followed by the release of volumes 1 & 2 of the DisNigga EP series. In Fall 2021, the band supported Sheer Mag on the East Coast US tour, including an appearance on Coheed and Cambria's S.S. Neverender cruise.

In 2022, Polo was accused of sexual assault by deception, and subsequently stepped down from the band. On March 25, 2022, the band released their album Diaspora Problems via Epitaph. In Summer 2022, the band supported Show Me the Body on the "Half-a-USA" tour alongside Wifigawd. On August 26, 2022, Soul Glo supported My Chemical Romance on their Reunion tour at the PNC Arena alongside Turnstile. In November 2022, the band embarked on a Northeast US co-headlining tour with City of Caterpillar with support from Thirdface.

The band performed at the 22nd Coachella Valley Music and Arts Festival in April 2023.

== Style ==
The band has been described as a mix of hardcore punk, punk rock and rap rock.

== Members ==
=== Current members ===
- GG Guerra – guitar, programming (2022–present) bass, programming (2017–2022)
- Pierce Jordan – vocals, programming (2014–present)
- TJ Stevenson – drums (2018–present)

=== Former members ===
- Ruben Polo – guitar (2014–2022)
- Jamie Sokol – drums (2014–2018)
- Ethan Brennan – bass (2014–2017)

=== Touring members ===
- Rob Blackwell – bass (2022–present)
- Leon Da Boss – bass (2022–present)
- Winston Hightower – bass (2024–present)

== Discography ==
=== Albums ===
- Untitled (2015)
- Untitled LP (2016, SRA Records)
- The Nigga in Me Is Me (2019, SRA Records)
- Diaspora Problems (2022, Epitaph/Secret Voice)
- Na I'm Gon Grab Allat (2027, Epitaph)

=== Extended plays ===
- Songs to Yeet at the Sun (2020, Secret Voice)
- DisNigga, Vol. 1 (2021, Epitaph)
- DisNigga, Vol. 2 (2021, Epitaph)

=== Singles ===
- "Too Late, Nigger I'm Tired" (2019)
- "(Quietly) Do the Right Thing" (2020)
- "29" (2020)
- "Jump! (Or Get Jumped by the Future!)" (2022)
- "Driponomics" (2022)
- "Gold Chain Punk (whogonbeatmyass?)" (2022)
- "If I Speak (Shut the Fuck Up)" (2023)
- "February Theory" (2026)
