= Brittany Howard =

American musician (born 1988)

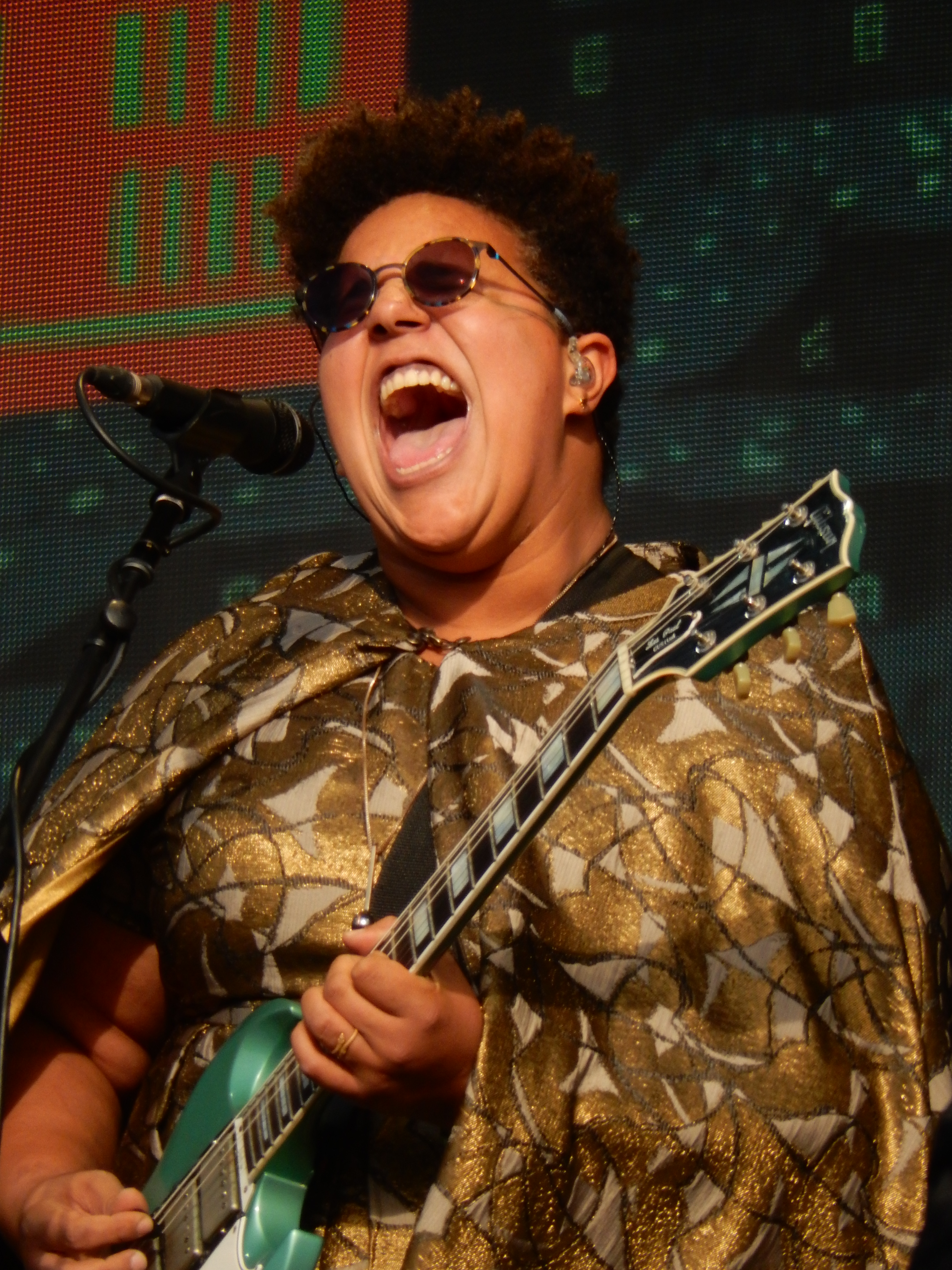
- Howard performing with Alabama Shakes in London, 2016

Background information
- Born: Brittany Amber Howard; October 2, 1988 (age 38); Athens, Alabama, U.S.
- Genres: Americana; garage rock; experimental rock; roots rock
- Occupation: Musician
- Instruments: Vocals; guitar; piano; drums; bass
- Years active: 2009–present
- Labels: ATO; Island
- Member of: Alabama Shakes
- Formerly of: Thunderbitch; Bermuda Triangle
- Website: brittanyhoward.com

Brittany Amber Howard (born October 2, 1988) is an American musician from Athens, Alabama. She rose to prominence in the early 2010s as the lead vocalist, rhythm guitarist, and primary songwriter of Alabama Shakes. Her work with Alabama Shakes and as a solo artist have garnered her five Grammy Awards (including Best Alternative Music Album) from 18 nominations. Later in the decade, Howard played bass in the side project Thunderbitch and both acoustic guitar and double bass for the trio Bermuda Triangle.

In 2018, Alabama Shakes announced it was going on hiatus. In 2019, Howard released her debut studio album as a solo artist, Jaime. The album received critical acclaim and seven Grammy nominations, winning Best Rock Song for "Stay High". Its follow-up, What Now, was released in February 2024. In early 2025, Alabama Shakes announced a summer reunion tour scheduled for July to September.

== Early life ==
Howard was born in Athens, Alabama, one of two daughters born to Christi (née Carter) and K. J. Howard. Her mother is white, of English and Irish ancestry while her father is African American. The family's home was in a junk yard and it once burned down from a lightning strike. She learned to write poetry and play the piano from her older sister Jaime, who died from retinoblastoma in 1998; Howard had the same affliction but survived with partial blindness in one eye. Her parents separated soon after that. She began playing the guitar at age 13; she was enamored with albums by Dionne Warwick and Elvis Presley, which she listened to repeatedly, and was inspired to write song lyrics.

Howard attended East Limestone High School, where she met future Alabama Shakes bassist Zac Cockrell. In high school, Howard began listening to 1970s rock music, such as Black Sabbath and Pink Floyd. "I'd be in the back of this Buick and be like 'What's this? This is really cool' and my friends told me it was Pink Floyd and I was like 'Whoa', it blew my mind. I started getting into all the classic rock stuff, like Yes, Cream, all that stuff."

After high school, Howard worked for the United States Postal Service until becoming a full-time musician as lead singer of Alabama Shakes.

== Career ==
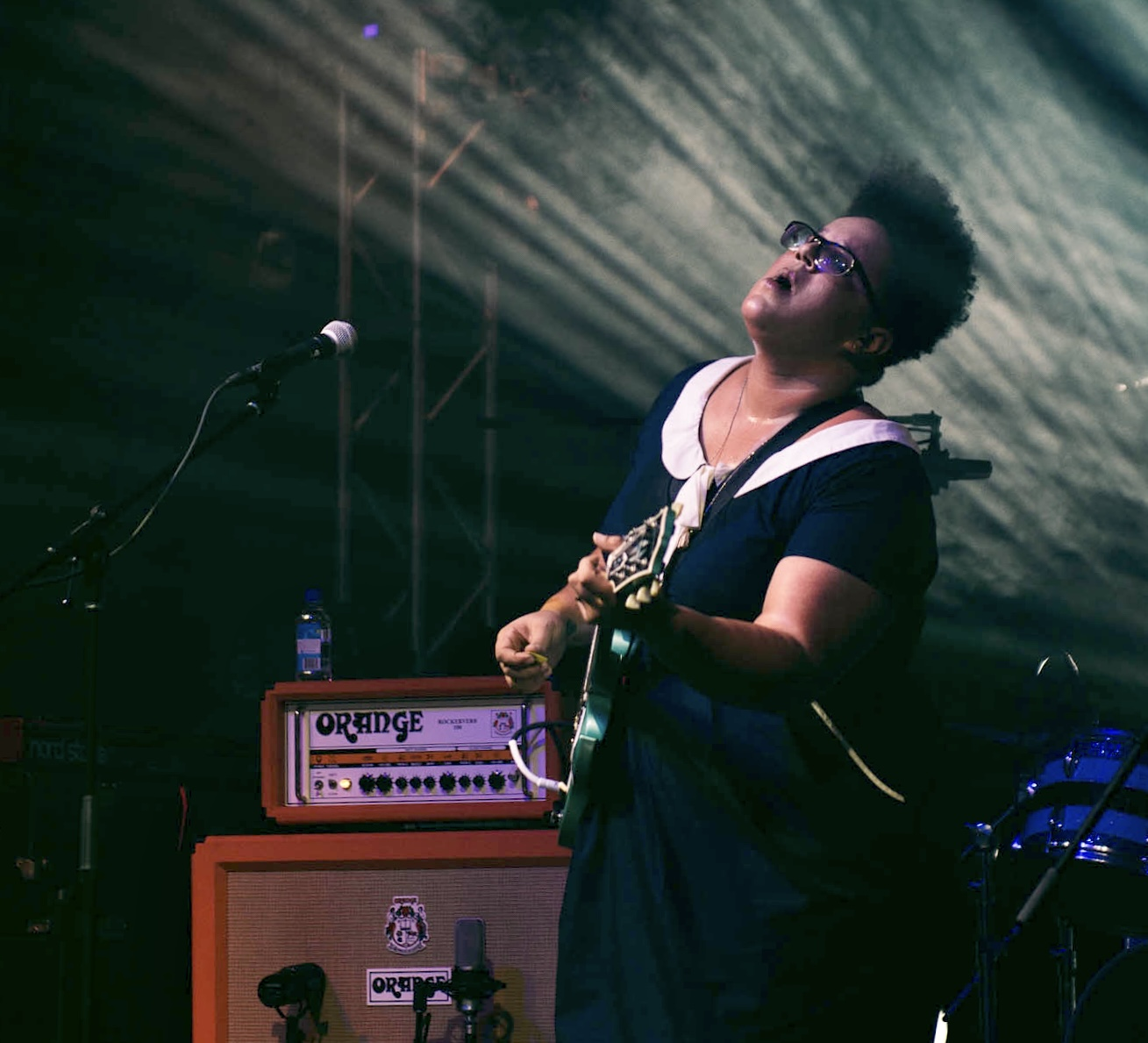
Howard performing with Alabama Shakes in 2014

Brittany Howard is best known as the lead singer and guitarist for the American rock band Alabama Shakes. The band formed under the name "The Shakes" when Howard and bassist Zac Cockrell began playing covers and original songs together with drummer Steve Johnson. Guitarist Heath Fogg later rounded out the lineup, and the band began playing shows at bars in Alabama and recording their debut album, Boys & Girls. They signed a record deal with ATO Records and released Boys & Girls in 2012 which received critical acclaim and multiple Grammy Award nominations.

In April 2015, Alabama Shakes released their second album, Sound & Color. It debuted at number one on the Billboard 200, and received favorable reviews from the music press. The band performed on multiple late night shows including Saturday Night Live, The Tonight Show Starring Jimmy Fallon, and The Late Show with Stephen Colbert. Howard was featured in the musical medley alongside Mavis Staples, Stephen Colbert, Ben Folds, and other artists in the series premiere of The Late Show with Stephen Colbert. At Lollapalooza in 2015, Howard was invited on stage to perform a duet of "Get Back" with Paul McCartney. She also performed at the ceremony for Eddie Murphy's Mark Twain Prize. In 2015, she was named the recipient of Billboard's Women in Music "Powerhouse" Award.

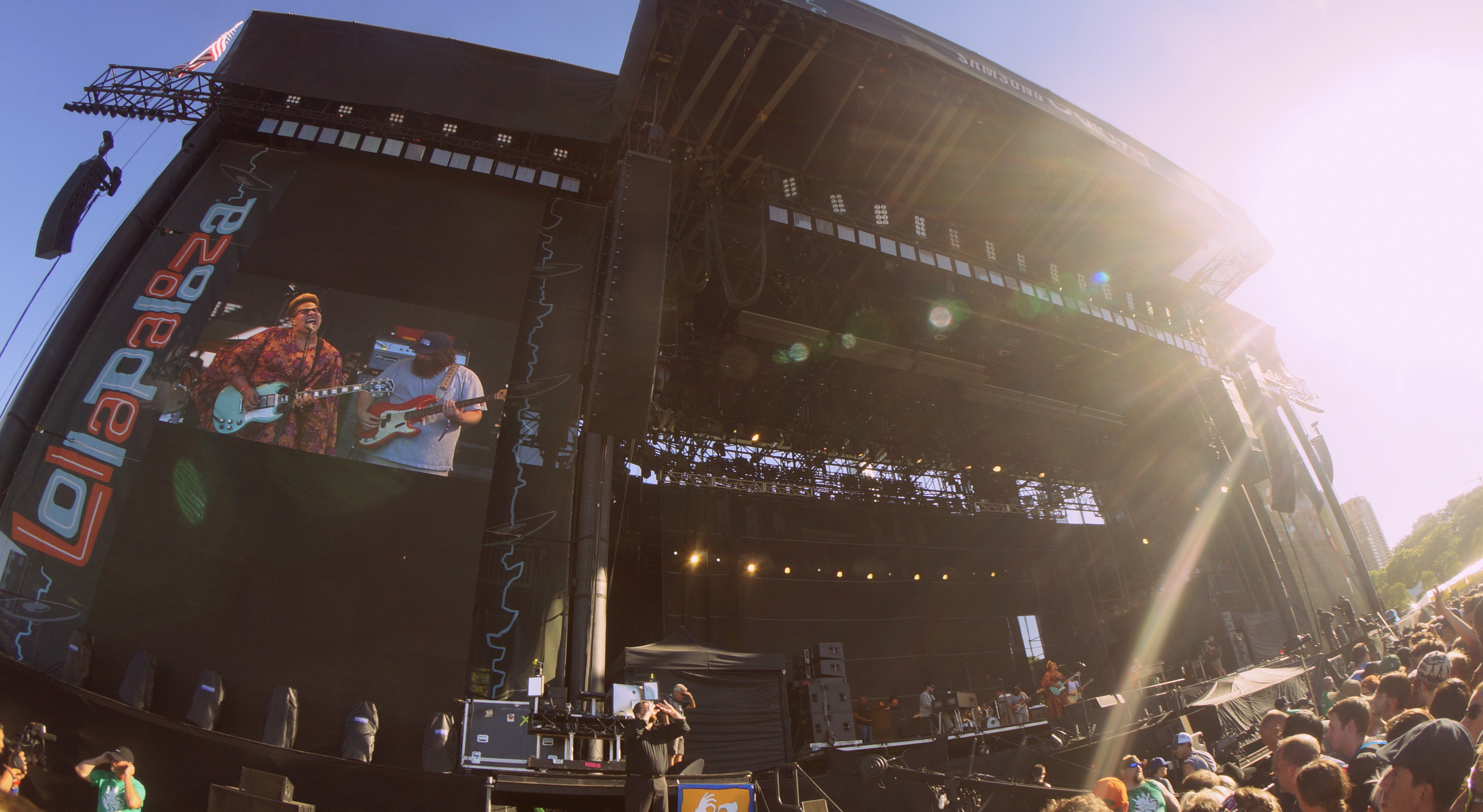
Brittany Howard performing with Alabama Shakes at Lollapalooza 2015

Howard is also the lead singer of the rock band Thunderbitch, formed in Nashville in 2012 with members of Clear Plastic Masks and ATO Records' labelmates Fly Golden Eagle. The band surprise released a self-titled album in September 2015. Although the band rarely makes live appearances, they played a rare set at ATO Records' CMJ Music Marathon showcase in October 2015.

Brittany Howard is also a singer in the band Bermuda Triangle with Jesse Lafser and Becca Mancari, which was formed in Nashville in 2017. Their debut live performance was on July 12, 2017, at the Basement East in Nashville. The trio released their first single on September 6, 2017, titled "Rosey", which was first released on Jesse Lafser's 2015 album "Raised On The Plains". Although originally believed to be a one time performance, the trio performed a five show tour through the southern states of the US in October 2017. This small tour included shows in Carrboro and Asheville, North Carolina; Birmingham, Alabama; Atlanta; and Knoxville, Tennessee.

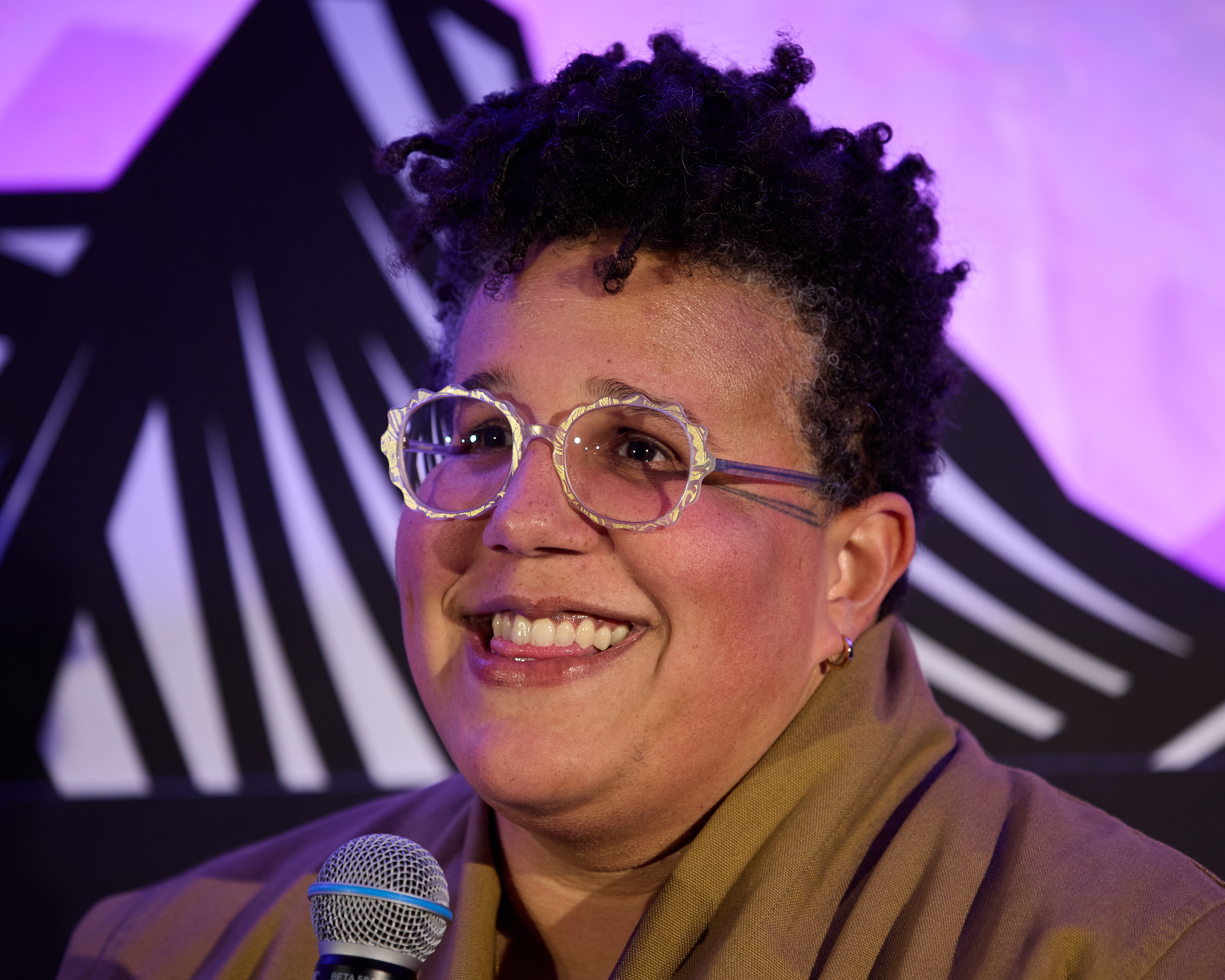
Howard talking about her new album at the 2024 Sundance Film Festival in January 2024

In June 2019, Brittany Howard announced a debut solo album, Jaime which was released on September 20, 2019, as well as a tour across North America and Europe. Jaime was received with universal acclaim; Pitchfork noted, "The exceptional solo debut from the Alabama Shakes singer-songwriter is a thrilling opus that pushes the boundaries of voice, sound, and soul to new extremes." On July 16, 2019, Howard released the music video to the single Stay High, featuring actor Terry Crews lip-syncing to the track. On April 15, 2020, she released a cover of a Funkadelic's 1971 song "You and Your Folks, Me and My Folks" and a new rendition of her song "Stay High". Stay High was recommended as an "appropriate musical remedy" to get people through lockdown and quarantine by KCRW. On October 13, 2023, she released the title track to her second album What Now. In the same year, Rolling Stone named Howard to its "250 Greatest Guitarists of All Time" list.

In 2024, Howard announced a co-headlining tour with British rhythm and blues singer-songwriter Michael Kiwanuka.

Howard made her acting debut in the animated film Thelma the Unicorn, which debuted on Netflix May 17, 2024. Howard's personality, hair, and songs were all used as inspiration for her character in the film.

In late November 2024, Howard announced the debut of her hardcore project Kumite. Kumite played their first show in Nashville, in January 2025.

In 2024, Howard co-wrote an original track with Ludwig Göransson, Pale Pale Moon, which was prominently featured in Ryan Coogler's film Sinners. Both Howard's original demo and the movie version performed by actress Jayme Lawson are featured on the soundtrack album.

On October 3, 2026, Howard will perform at the Power to the People Festival at Merriweather Post Pavilion in Columbia, MD. The festival, which is being put on by Tom Morello, will also feature performances by Morello, Bruce Springsteen, Foo Fighters and many others. The festival is being held in response to President Donald Trump.

== Influences ==
Artists Howard has cited as influences include Led Zeppelin, Sister Rosetta Tharpe, Prince, Curtis Mayfield, David Bowie, Mavis Staples, Tom Waits, Björk, Gil Scott-Heron, Freddie Mercury, and Tina Turner.

== Personal life ==
Howard came out as a lesbian at age 25. She married fellow musician Jesse Lafser in 2018; they divorced the following year. She has been in a relationship with Anna-Maria Babcock (Anya) since 2023. Howard and Babcock exchanged nuptials on October 24, 2026 in Franklin, TN.

== Awards and nominations ==
Year	Association	Category	Nominated Work	Result	Ref.
2019	Rober Award Music Prize	Best Female Artist	Herself	Nominated	
2019	Rober Award Music Prize	Best R&B	Herself	Nominated	
2019	Rober Award Music Prize	Album of the Year	Jaime	Nominated	
2019	UK Music Video Award	Best Rock Video - International	"Stay High"	Nominated	
2020	Grammy Award	Best Rock Song	"History Repeats"	Nominated	
2020	Grammy Award	Best Rock Performance	"History Repeats"	Nominated	
2020	GLAAD Media Award	Outstanding Music Artist	Jaime	Nominated	
2020	Americana Music Honors & Awards	Artist of the Year	Herself	Nominated	
2020	Americana Music Honors & Awards	Song of the Year	"Stay High"	Nominated	
2020	Americana Music Honors & Awards	Album of the Year	Jaime	Nominated	
2020	Libera Award	Album of the Year	Jaime	Nominated	
2021	Grammy Award	Best Rock Performance	"Stay High"	Nominated	
2021	Grammy Award	Best Rock Song	"Stay High"	Won	
2021	Grammy Award	Best Alternative Music Album	Jaime	Nominated	
2021	Grammy Award	Best R&B Performance	"Goat Head"	Nominated	
2021	Grammy Award	Best American Roots Performance	"Short and Sweet"	Nominated	
2021	Libera Award	Best Sync Usage	"You'll Never Walk Alone" (Johnnie Walker's #KeepItMoving Campaign)	Nominated	
2022	Libera Award	Best Dance Record	"Stay High again.."	Nominated	
2022	Libera Award	Best R&B Record	Jaime (Reimagined)	Nominated	
2025	Grammy Award	Best Alternative Music Album	What Now	Nominated	
2026	Grammy Award	Best Song Written for Visual Media	"Pale, Pale Moon"	Nominated	

== Discography ==
Brittany Howard discography
- Studio albums: 2
- Extended plays: 4
- Singles: 16
- Remix albums: 1

=== Studio albums ===
List of studio albums, with selected information
Title	Details	Peak chart positions									
Title	Details	US	AUT	BEL (FL)	BEL (WA)	CAN	FRA	NL	SCO	SPA	UK
Jaime	Released: September 20, 2019; Label: ATO; Formats: CD, LP, digital download	13	59	29	159	34	182	76	13	98	36
What Now	Released: February 9, 2024; Label: Island; Formats: CD, LP, digital download	— (Note: What Now did not enter the Billboard 200 but peaked at number 33 on the Top Album Sales chart.)	—	75	—	—	—	—	45	—	— (Note: What Now did not enter the Uk Albums Chart but peaked at number 25 on the UK Album Sales Chart.)
"—" denotes a recording that did not chart or was not released in that territory.

=== Remix albums ===
Title	Details	Peak chart positions
Title	Details	US Current
Jaime (Reimagined)	Released: July 23, 2021; Label: ATO; Formats: LP, digital download, streaming	71

=== Extended plays ===
Title	Details	Peak chart positions	
Title	Details	US Sales	US Folk
Spotify Singles	Released: April 15, 2020; Label: ATO; Formats: streaming	—	—
Live at Sound Emporium	Released: August 29, 2020; Label: ATO; Formats: LP	51	20
Jaime (The Remixes)	Released: September 17, 2020; Label: ATO; Formats: Digital download	—	—
Live from East West Studios	Released: May 7, 2021; Label: ATO; Formats: Digital download	—	—

=== Singles ===
==== As lead artist ====
Title	Year	Peak chart positions									Album
Title	Year	US AAA	US Adult R&B	US Alt. Dig.	US Rock	BEL (FL) Tip	CAN Rock	MEX Air	NLD Air	NZ Hot	Album
"I Wonder" (with Ruby Amanfu)	2012	—	—	—	—	—	—	—	—	—	Non-album single
"History Repeats"	2019	—	—	—	—	— (Note: "History Repeats" did not enter the Flanders Ultratop 50, but charted as an extra tip on the Flanders Ultratip chart.)	—	49	—	—	Jaime
"Stay High"	2019	1	23	24	34	22	—	50	41	—	Jaime
"He Loves Me"	2020	28	—	—	—	—	—	—	—	—	Jaime
"You'll Never Walk Alone"	2020	—	—	12	— (Note: "You'll Never Walk Alone" did not enter the Hot Rock Songs chart, but peaked at number 11 on the Rock Digital Songs chart.)	—	—	—	—	—	Non-album single
"Stay High again.." (with Joy Anonymous and Fred again..)	2021	—	—	—	—	—	—	—	—	—	Jaime (Reimagined)
"(Your Love Keeps Lifting Me) Higher and Higher" (Amazon Original)	2021	—	—	—	—	—	—	—	—	—	Non-album single
"Presence" (Little Dragon Remix)	2021	—	—	—	—	—	—	—	—	—	Jaime (Reimagined)
"Tomorrow" (BadBadNotGood Remix)	2021	—	—	—	—	—	—	—	—	—	Jaime (Reimagined)
"Checks and Balances" (from the Netflix series We the People) (with Kristen Anderson-Lopez, Lin-Manuel Miranda, Robert Lopez, and Daveed Diggs)	2021	—	—	—	—	—	—	—	—	—	Non-album single
"Stay High" (Childish Gambino remix)	2021	—	—	—	—	—	—	—	—	36	Jaime (Reimagined)
"Running with the Angels" (with Tia P.)	2022	—	—	—	—	—	—	—	—	—	Non-album single
"What Now"	2023	1	—	—	— (Note: "What Now" did not enter the Hot Rock & Alternative Songs chart, but peaked at number 26 on the Rock & Alternative Airplay chart.)	—	30	—	—	—	What Now
"Red Flags"	2023	—	—	—	—	—	—	—	—	—	What Now
"Prove It to You"	2024	29	—	—	—	—	—	—	—	—	What Now
"Power to Undo"	2024	—	—	—	—	—	—	—	—	—	What Now
"—" denotes a recording that did not chart or was not released in that territory.

==== As featured artist ====
Title	Year	Album
"Higher" (Thad Cockrell featuring Brittany Howard)	2020	If In Case You Feel the Same

=== Other charted songs ===
Title	Year	Peak chart positions	Album
Title	Year	US Sales	Album
"It Makes No Difference" (My Morning Jacket featuring Brittany Howard)	2012	11	Endless Highway - The Music of the Band

=== Other appearances ===
List of non-single guest appearances, with other performing artists, showing year released and album name
Title	Year	Other artist(s)	Album
"For You Alone"	2011	Matt Stephens	Matt Stephens
"West on Train"	2013	Turk Tresize	Soul Casino
"Trouble Sleep Yanga Wake Am"	2013	My Morning Jacket, Merrill Garbus	Red Hot + Fela
"I Feel Free"	2015	—N/a	Joy (Music from the Motion Picture)
"Darkness and Light"	2016	John Legend	Darkness and Light
"Higher"	2020	Thad Cockrell	If In Case You Feel The Same
"Shining Star"	2022	Verdine White	Minions: Rise of Gru (Original Motion Picture Soundtrack)
"Fire Inside"	2024	—N/a	Thelma the Unicorn: Soundtrack From The Netflix Film
"Walk of Fame"	2025	Miley Cyrus	Something Beautiful

=== With Alabama Shakes ===
- Boys & Girls (2012)
- Sound & Color (2015)

=== With Thunderbitch ===
- Thunderbitch (2015)
