= My Morning Jacket discography =

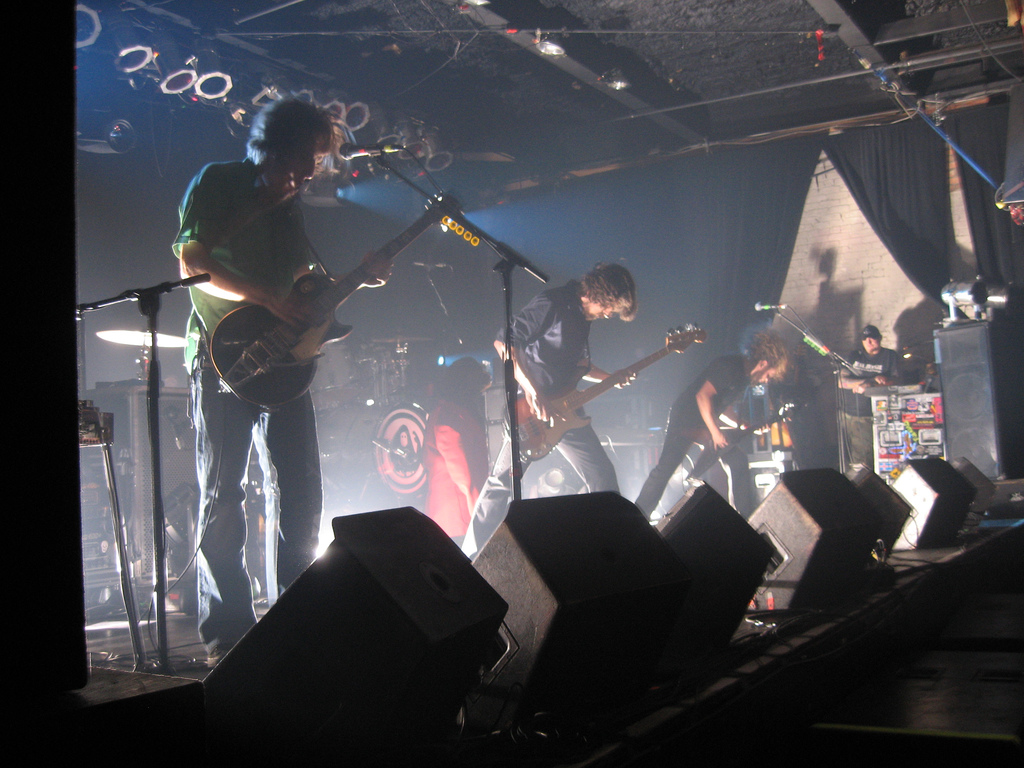
- Studio albums: 9
- Extended plays: 12
- Live albums: 7
- Compilation albums: 3
- Singles: 22
- Video albums: 1
- Music videos: 5

The discography of American indie rock band My Morning Jacket consists of 9 studio albums, 12 extended plays, 22 singles, 5 music videos, 3 compilation albums, 11 live albums, and 1 video album. The band signed with independent Darla Records in 1998 before moving to ATO in 2003.

== Albums ==
=== Studio albums ===
List of studio albums, with selected chart positions, sales figures and certifications
Title	Album details	Peak chart positions									
Title	Album details	US	BEL	CAN	IRE	NLD	NOR	SCO	SPA	SWE	UK
The Tennessee Fire	Released: June 18, 1999; Label: Darla; Formats: CD, LP, download	—	—	—	—	—	—	—	—	—	—
At Dawn	Released: April 6, 2001; Label: Darla; Formats: CD, LP, download	—	—	—	—	—	—	—	—	—	189
It Still Moves	Released: September 9, 2003; Label: ATO; Formats: CD, LP, download	121	—	—	—	—	—	56	—	53	62
Z	Released: October 4, 2005; Label: ATO; Formats: CD, LP, download	67	71	—	—	—	—	64	—	—	74
Evil Urges	Released: June 10, 2008; Label: ATO; Formats: CD, LP, download	9	34	—	—	70	—	—	—	55	125
Circuital	Released: May 31, 2011; Label: ATO; Formats: CD, LP, download	5	61	15	75	91	22	59	67	12	60
The Waterfall	Released: May 4, 2015; Label: ATO; Formats: CD, LP, download	11	49	20	30	48	—	33	82	38	42
The Waterfall II	Released: July 10, 2020; Label: ATO; Formats: CD, LP, download	117	134	—	—	—	—	—	—	—	—
My Morning Jacket	Released: October 22, 2021; Label: ATO; Formats: LP, download	49	—	—	—	—	—	66	—	— (Note: My Morning Jacket did not enter the Sverigetopplistan Albums chart, but peaked at number 8 on the Sverigetopplistan Vinyl chart.)	— (Note: My Morning Jacket did not enter the UK Albums Chart, but peaked at number 60 on the UK Physical Album Chart.)
Is	Release: March 21, 2025; Label: ATO; Formats: LP, download	111	—	—	—	—	—	41	—	—	—
"—" denotes a recording that did not chart or was not released in that territory.

=== Live albums ===
- Okonokos (September 26, 2006; US #131)
- iTunes Live from Las Vegas Exclusively at the Palms (January 13, 2009; US #94)
- Celebración de la Ciudad Natal (April 18, 2009, Record Store Day 2009 exclusive; US #158)
- My Morning Jacket Live at 9:30 Club (January 26, 2011)
- Henry Fonda Theatre - Los Angeles, CA (2005) (October 2, 2020)
- The Tabernacle - Atlanta, GA (2006) (October 2, 2020)
- Ascend Amphitheater - Nashville, TN (2015) (October 2, 2020)
- MMJ Live Vol. 1: Live 2015 (September 3, 2021)
- Live from RCA Studio A (Jim James Acoustic) (June 18, 2022, Record Store Day 2022 exclusive)
- MMJ Live Vol. 2: Chicago 2021 (October 21, 2022)
- MMJ Live Vol. 3: Bonnaroo 2004 (June 9, 2023)
- MMJ Live Vol. 4: New York 2010, Terminal 5 - The Tennessee Fire (November 22, 2024)

=== Compilation albums ===
- Early Recordings: Chapter 1: The Sandworm Cometh (November 2004)
- Early Recordings: Chapter 2: Learning (November 2004)
- At Dawn/Tennessee Fire Demos Package (June 2007)

=== Video albums ===
- Okonokos (DVD, October 2006)

=== Other albums ===
- Happy Holiday! (November 2023)
- Peacelands (January 2026)

== Extended plays ==
- Heartbreakin Man (May 2000)
- My Morning Jacket Does Bad Jazz (July 2000)
- We Wish You a Merry Christmas and a Happy New Year! a.k.a. My Morning Jacket Does Xmas Fiasco Style! (October 2000, US version)
- We Wish You a Merry Christmas and a Happy New Year! a.k.a. My Morning Jacket Does Xmas Fiasco Style! (December 2000, EU version)
- My Morning Jacket Does Gold Hole (January 2001)
- Split EP (with Songs: Ohia) (April 2002)
- Chocolate and Ice (April 2002)
- Sweatbees (November 2002; UK version)
- Sweatbees (May 2003; Australian version)
- Acoustic Citsuoca (May 2004)
- Off the Record EP (October 2005)
- iTunes Session (December 2011; US #191)

== Singles ==
List of singles, with selected chart positions, showing year released as single and album name
Title	Year	Peak chart positions								Album
Title	Year	US Sales	US AAA	US Alt.	US Airplay	US Rock	MEX Air.	SCO	UK	Album
"Run Thru"	2003	—	—	—	—	—	—	—	—	It Still Moves
"Mahgeetah"	2003	—	—	—	—	—	—	—	—	It Still Moves
"One Big Holiday"	2004	—	—	—	—	—	47	—	—	It Still Moves
"Golden"	2004	—	—	—	—	—	—	—	—	It Still Moves
"Off the Record"	2005	—	—	—	—	—	—	87	114	Z
"Gideon"	2006	—	—	—	—	—	—	—	—	Z
"Touch Me I'm Going to Scream Pt. 2"	2008	—	—	—	—	—	—	—	—	Evil Urges
"I'm Amazed"	2008	—	5	—	—	—	—	—	—	Evil Urges
"Circuital"	2011	25	—	—	—	—	—	—	—	Circuital
"Holdin on to Black Metal"	2011	8	11	36	48	48	27	—	—	Circuital
"The Day Is Coming"	2011	—	—	—	—	—	—	33	—	Circuital
"Outta My System"	2011	18	—	—	—	—	—	46	—	Circuital
"Friends Again"	2011	5	—	—	—	—	—	—	—	Non-album singles
"It Makes No Difference" (featuring Brittany Howard)	2012	11	—	—	—	—	—	—	—	Non-album singles
"This Land Is Your Land"	2014	—	—	—	—	—	—	—	—	Non-album singles
"Big Decisions"	2015	—	7	—	41	—	35	—	—	The Waterfall
"Spring (Among the Living)"	2015	—	—	—	—	—	—	—	—	The Waterfall
"Compound Fracture"	2015	—	18	—	—	—	—	—	—	The Waterfall
"Feel You"	2020	—	1	—	39	—	—	—	—	The Waterfall II
"Run It"	2020	—	21	—	—	—	—	—	—	The Waterfall II
"Regularly Scheduled Programming"	2021	—	—	—	—	—	—	—	—	My Morning Jacket
"Love Love Love"	2021	—	6	—	42	—	—	—	—	My Morning Jacket
"Time Waited"	2025	—	1	—	31	—	—	—	—	Is
"Squid Ink"	2025	—	—	—	—	—	—	—	—	Is
"Everyday Magic"	2025	—	1	—	29	—	—	—	—	Is
"—" denotes a recording that did not chart or was not released in that territory.

=== Other releases ===
List of singles, with selected chart positions, showing year released as single and album name
Title	Year	Peak chart positions	Album
Title	Year	UK	Album
"Just Because I Do" / "The Bear"	2003	189	At Dawn / The Tennessee Fire

== Music videos ==
Year	Song
2005	"Off the Record"
2008	"Touch Me I'm Going to Scream, Pt. 2"
2011	"Holdin On to Black Metal"
2012	"Outta My System"
2021	"Regularly Scheduled Programming"
2025	"Time Waited"
2025	"Squid Ink"
2025	"Everyday Magic"

== Compilation appearances ==
- Little Darla Has a Treat for You Vol. 14 (2000)
- Louisville Is for Lovers Vol. 1 (February 2001)
- 2 Meter Sessies Volume 10 (September 2001)
- Louisville Is for Lovers Vol. 2 (February 2002)
- KVRX 91.7 FM presents local live v.6 unlimited bandwidth (June 2002)
- ATO Records 53 (October 2002)
- A Gift from a Garden to a Flower: A Tribute to Donovan (November 2002)
- Oxford American 2003 Southern Music CD No. 6 (2003)
- The Mother Lodge: A Tribute to the Rudyard Kipling, Volume 1 (March 2003)
- Live from Bonnaroo 2003 (October 2003)
- X-Ray CD #10 (October 2003)
- 270 Miles from Graceland – Bonnaroo 2003 DVD (November 2003)
- ATO Records 54 (December 2003)
- Live @ The World Café Volume 18: I'll Take You There (September 2004)
- KCRW Sounds Eclectic 3 (October 2004)
- SPUNK Days of Future Past: "The Way That He Sings" (October 2004)
- KEXP presents Music That Matters Vol. 1 (November 2004)
- KFOG Live from the Archives 11 (November 2004)
- The WIRED CD: Rip. Sample. Mash. Share.: "One Big Holiday" (November 2004)
- Louisville Is for Lovers Vol. 5 (February 2005)
- duyster. (March 2005)
- Return to Sin City – A Tribute to Gram Parsons DVD (March 2005)
- Bonnaroo Music Festival 2004 (April 2005)
- Live from Bonnaroo 2004 DVD (May 2005)
- Live at KEXP Volume One (June 2005)
- MOJO: Dylan Covered: M. WARD, CONOR OBERST & JIM JAMES – "Girl From The North" Country(August 2005)
- Elizabethtown: Songs from the Brown Hotel EP (August 2005)
- Austin City Limits Music Festival – Live from Austin, Texas 2004 (August 2005)
- Austin City Limits Music Festival – Live from Austin, Texas 2004 DVD (August 2005)
- Elizabethtown: Music from the Motion Picture: "Where to Begin" (September 2005)
- For a Decade of Sin: 11 Years of Bloodshot Records (October 2005)
- MOJO: Born in the USA Volume 2: The New American Songbook: JIM JAMES "Sooner (live)" (December 2005)
- Elizabethtown: Music from the Motion Picture – Vol. 2 (February 2006)
- Louisville Is for Lovers Vol. 6 (February 2006)
- On XRT: Live from the Archives, Volume 9 (October 2006)
- Endless Highway: The Music of The Band: "It Makes No Difference" (January 2007)
- Paste Magazine New Music Sampler – Issue 44 (July 2008)
- Dark Was the Night – A Red Hot Compilation: "El Caporal" (February 2009)
- Twistable, Turnable Man: A Musical Tribute to the Songs of Shel Silverstein (June 2010)
- Muppets: The Green Album: "Our World" (August 2011)
- Beale Street Music Festival Bud Light Stage May 4th, 2012*
- Wrote a Song for Everyone: "Long as I Can See the Light", with John Fogerty (May 2013)
- Dallas Buyers Club (Music From and Inspired By the Motion Picture): "Ready to Be Called On" (October 2013)
