= Celebración de la Ciudad Natal =

Live album by My Morning Jacket
- Released: April 18, 2009
- Recorded: Ear-X-Tacy, Louisville, Ky. Louisville Waterfront Park, Louisville, Ky.
- Genre: Rock, Country, Indie rock
- Label: ATO

My Morning Jacket chronology
iTunes Live from Las Vegas Exclusively at the Palms (2009)	Celebración de la Ciudad Natal (2009)

Celebración de la Ciudad Natal (Spanish: Hometown Celebration) is a live album by the indie rock band My Morning Jacket, released exclusively for Record Store Day and sold only in exclusive independent retail stores. The audio was taken from two concerts held in Louisville, Kentucky, at the record store Ear X-Tacy and at Waterfront Park. On May 1 the band re-released the album digitally, also sold exclusively on an independent music site and available for streaming on Spotify.

== Track listing ==
1. "Evil Urges"
2. "Highly Suspicious"
3. Interlude: 'The Local Independent Shit'
4. "Gideon"
5. "Where to Begin"
6. "Librarian"
7. "Phone Went West"
8. "Dondante"

== Notes ==
- Tracks 1, 2 and 6 taken from Evil Urges.
- Tracks 4, 8 taken from Z.
- Track 7 taken from At Dawn.
- Track 3 is an audio interlude with the audience.
- Track 5 appears in the soundtrack to the film Elizabethtown.
