= Sweatbees =

Compilation album by My Morning Jacket
- Released: November 2002
- Recorded: 2001–2002
- Genre: Indie
- Length: 39:04
- Label: Spunk Records

My Morning Jacket chronology
Sweatbees (2002)	The Sandworm Cometh (2004)

Sweatbees is a compilation album by Louisville, Kentucky rock band My Morning Jacket. It was released as a five-track EP in the UK on the Wichita label in 2002 and a nine-track compilation in Australia on the Spunk label in 2003. On both versions it comprised tracks from the band's second album At Dawn and two EPs.

== Track listing ==
=== UK release ===
(All tracks by Jim James)

1. "Lowdown" – 3:56 (originally on At Dawn)
2. "The Way That He Sings" – 5:37 (originally on At Dawn)
3. "O is the One That Is Real" – 3:40 (originally on My Morning Jacket/Songs: Ohia Split EP)
4. "Come Closer" – 4:57 (originally on My Morning Jacket/Songs: Ohia Split EP)
5. "Sooner" – 3:41 (originally on Chocolate and Ice)

=== Australian release ===
(All tracks by Jim James)

1. "Lowdown" – 3:56
2. "The Way That He Sings" – 5:37
3. "O is the One That Is Real" – 3:40
4. "Come Closer" – 4:57
5. "Sooner" – 3:41
6. "Sweetheart" – 3:07 (originally on Chocolate and Ice)
7. "Can You See the Hard Helmet on My Head?" – 3:46 (originally on Chocolate and Ice)
8. "Death is the Easy Way" – 5:30 (originally on At Dawn)
9. "How Do You Know" – 4:49 (originally on My Morning Jacket/Songs: Ohia Split EP)

== Personnel ==
- Jim James – guitar
- Danny Cash – keyboards
- Patrick Hallahan – drums
- Johnny Quaid – guitar
- Two-Tone Tommy – bass
