= Futurebirds =

US musical group

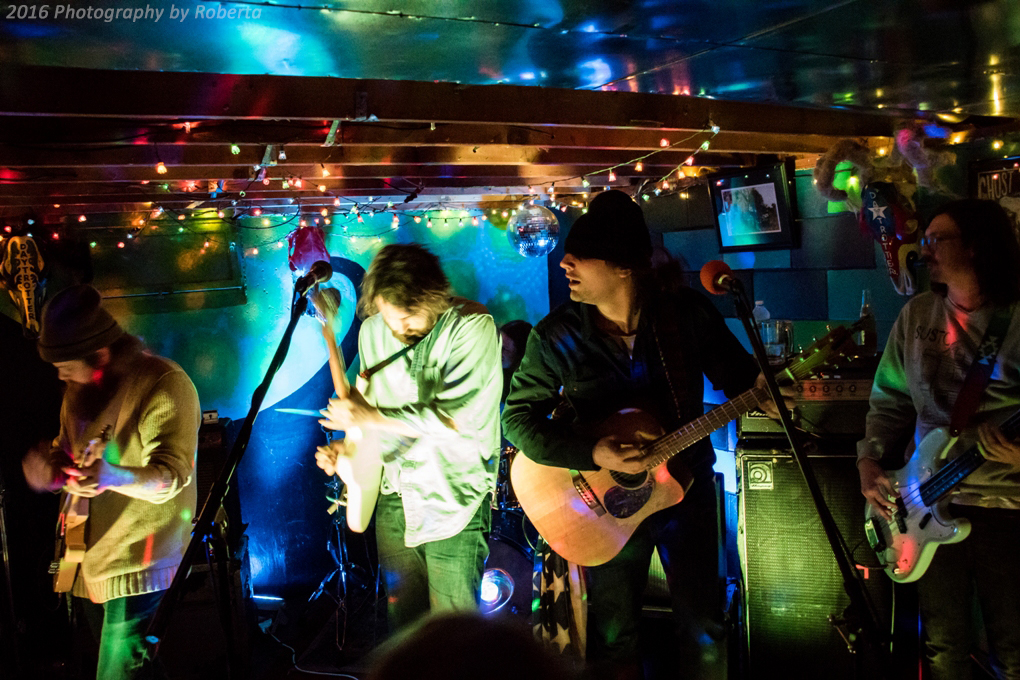

Background information
- Origin: Athens, Georgia, U.S.
- Genres: Rock And Roll
- Years active: 2008–present
- Members: Thomas Johnson; Carter King; Brannen Miles; Daniel Womack; Tom Myers
- Past members: Payton Bradford; Dennis Love; Johnny Lundock; Jeff Wilson; Kiffy Myers
- Website: www.futurebirdsmusic.com

Futurebirds are an American Rock and Roll band formed in 2008 from Athens, Georgia, United States. Founded by University of Georgia students Daniel Womack, Carter King, Thomas Johnson, Brannen Miles and Payton Bradford, the group emerged from Athens' longstanding independent music scene and developed a style that blends rock and roll, Americana, country rock, folk rock, and neo-psychedelia.

Futurebirds are known for their energetic performances. A defining characteristic of the band is the presence of three primary songwriters—Womack, King, and Johnson—whose distinct songwriting styles contribute to the band's eclectic catalog.

The band has often shared the stage with Widespread Panic, Drive-By Truckers, Dead Confederate, Carl Broemel, The Whigs, Blitzen Trapper and Jonny Corndawg.

== History ==
=== Formation and Early Years (2008–2012) ===
The early addition of pedal steel guitarist Dennis Love into the lineup helped solidify their unique sound, helping bridge traditional country influences with contemporary indie rock aesthetics.

Following a self released, self-title EP, their first full length album, Hampton's Lullaby, was released via the Aquarium Drunkard imprint, Autumn Tone Records, on July 27, 2010. Their self titled EP was re-released in February 2011 and their second EP, Via Flamina, was released in April 2011.

During the summer of 2011 the group toured with Grace Potter and the Nocturnals on the Bonnaroo Buzz Tour and performed twice during the Bonnaroo festival.

=== Baba Yaga and Hotel Parties (2013–2017) ===
The years following Futurebirds' debut saw the band refine and expand its sound through a steady stream of releases and extensive touring. Albums including Baba Yaga (2013) and Hotel Parties (2015) showcased a broader musical palette while maintaining the band's signature blend of Southern rock, country, folk, and indie influences.

During this period, Payton Bradford and Dennis Love departed the group, ushering in a series of lineup changes. Despite the evolving roster, the band's core identity remained anchored by the songwriting and vocal contributions of Daniel Womack, Carter King, and Thomas Johnson, alongside the steady presence of bassist Brannen Miles.

=== Teamwork and Pandemic Period (2018–2020) ===
Futurebirds entered a new phase with the release of Teamwork (2020), an album expands Futurebirds' "cosmic country" sound through collaborative songwriting, rich instrumentation, and a blend of rock, folk, and psychedelic influences. Critics noted its polished production, melodic songwriting, and emphasis on the band's collective chemistry and evolving musical range.

Released during the COVID-19 pandemic, the album arrived at a time when traditional touring opportunities were largely unavailable. In support of the record, Futurebirds performed a series of socially distanced backyard and house-party shows, relying on grassroots fan engagement and word-of-mouth promotion.

=== Carl Broemel Collaboration (2021–2023) ===
Beginning in 2021, Futurebirds embarked on a creative partnership with Carl Broemel of My Morning Jacket. The collaboration resulted in the companion EPs Bloomin' and Bloomin' Too, as well as the live album ...Thanks Y'All. The period also marked a significant lineup development with the addition of drummer Tom Myers, whose arrival helped solidify the band's modern touring and recording lineup.

=== Dualtone Records & Brad Cook Production (2024–2026) ===
In 2024, Futurebirds signed with Dualtone Records and released Easy Company, their first full-length album for the label. Produced by Brad Cook of Megafaun and featuring guest appearances from Katie Crutchfield of Waxahatchee and Patterson Hood, the album brought renewed national attention to the Athens-based group.

Futurebirds released Far Out Country I & II in 2026, the band's first double album and most ambitious studio project to date. Again produced by Cook, the eighteen-song collection was conceived as two complementary halves exploring themes of friendship, family, adulthood, and life on the road.

== Discography ==
=== Studio albums ===
- Hampton's Lullaby (2010), Autumn Tone
- Baba Yaga (2013), Fat Possum
- Hotel Parties (2015), Easy Sound
- Teamwork (2020), VL4L Records
- Easy Company (2024), Dualtone Music Group
- Far Out Country I&II, (2026), Dualtone Music Group

=== Live albums ===
- Seney-Stovall (2012)
- Thanks Y'all (2023), featuring Carl Broemel of My Morning Jacket, *sometimes billed as 'Carlbirds'

=== EPs ===
- Futurebirds (2009), Self released - reissued (2011), Autumn Tone
- Via Flamina (2011), Autumn Tone
- Baba Java (2014), VL4L Records
- Portico I (2016), Easy Sound
- Portico II (2017), Easy Sound Re-released as Portico, a full-length compilation with Portico I in 2018 on VL/4L Records.
- Bloomin' (2021), featuring Carl Broemel of My Morning Jacket
- Bloomin' Too (2022), featuring Carl Broemel of My Morning Jacket
- Ghoulin' Around (2022 - Halloween release)

=== Split/Single ===
- 'Painted Tears' (2015), A-side split single. B-side 'Too Little, Too Late' by T. Hardy Morris. Record Store Day release
