= Off the Record (My Morning Jacket song) =

2005 song by My Morning Jacket

Single by My Morning Jacket

from the album Z
- B-side: "How Could I Know"; "Chills"
- Released: October 2005
- Recorded: 2005, Allaire Studios, Shokan, New York, United States
- Genre: Indie rock; reggae; chill-out
- Length: 5:33 (album version); 3:24 (single edit)
- Label: ATO
- Songwriters: Jim James; "Two-Tone" Tommy; Patrick Hallahan
- Producers: John Leckie; Jim James

My Morning Jacket singles chronology
"Golden" (2004)	"Off the Record" (2005)	"Gideon" (2006)

"Off the Record" is a song by American indie rock band My Morning Jacket, released as a single in October 2005 by ATO Records.

== Music video ==
The music video for "Off the Record" features a school boy telling something to a young girl, who then passes the saying to another person; it eventually spreads to an office building. The people are soon arrested by the police for telling the saying.

== Track listings ==
Compact disc

1. "Off the Record" (single edit) – 3:24
2. "How Could I Know" – 5:27
3. "Chills" – 4:40
4. "Off the Record" – 5:33

7" vinyl

1. "Off the Record" – 5:33
2. "How Could I Know" – 5:27

== Personnel ==
- Carl Broemel – guitar
- Patrick Hallahan – drums
- Jim James – vocals, lead and rhythm guitars
- Bo Koster – keyboards
- "Two-Tone" Tommy – bass guitar

== Media ==
The song "Chills" appears on the soundtrack of the television series Heroes. "Off the Record" is played at the end of the How I Met Your Mother episode "Game Night".

== Cover version ==
"Off the Record" was covered by Swedish performer Moneybrother on his 2006 album Pengabrorsan. The cover version is titled "Under Bordet", has a faster tempo, and is sung in Swedish.
