= Early Recordings (My Morning Jacket album series) =

- Cover art for Chapter 1: The Sandworm Cometh

Compilation album by My Morning Jacket
- Released: November 15, 2004 (Chapter 1); November 23, 2004 (Chapter 2)
- Recorded: 1997–1999
- Genre: Indie rock; psychedelic rock; neo-psychedelia; southern rock
- Length: 39:58 (Chapter 1); 53:09 (Chapter 2)
- Label: Darla
- Producer: Jim James

My Morning Jacket chronology
Acoustic Citsuoca (2004)	Early Recordings (2004)	Z (2005)

Learning
- Cover art for Chapter 2: Learning

The Sandworm Cometh
Review scores
Source	Rating
AllMusic	link
Pitchfork	6.9/10
PopMatters	7/10

Learning
Review scores
Source	Rating
AllMusic	link
Pitchfork	6.9/10
PopMatters	4/10

Early Recordings is a compilation album series by Louisville, Kentucky rock band My Morning Jacket. It was released in 2004 on Darla Records. The two constituent albums, called chapters, are called The Sandworm Cometh and Learning respectively. Danny Cash created the graphic design to both albums and played bass and keyboard on the second. J. Glenn performed drums for the series and Johnny Quaid played guitar. "Two-Tone" Tommy played bass for the first album, but Quaid took over for the second.

== The Sandworm Cometh ==
=== Track listing ===
All tracks are written by Jim James, except where noted.

No.	Title	Writer(s)	Length
1.	"Weeks Go by Like Days"		4:16
2.	"What Will I Do?"		1:35
3.	"M. White Rabbit" (Jefferson Airplane cover)	Grace Slick	2:29
4.	"Downtown"		1:36
5.	"I Just Wanted to Be Yo Friend"		2:29
6.	"Time Never Gets"		1:43
7.	"They Ran" (Acoustic)		3:34
8.	"Evelyn" (Be-Mixed)		2:31
9.	"Isobella W/ The White Umbrella"		3:04
10.	"Josta Dreams and Bitter Hands"		1:41
11.	"Sleep Walk"/"Olde Sept Blues (Ga-Ed Out)" (Santo & Johnny cover ("Sleep Walk"))	Johnny Farina, Santo Farina ("Sleep Walk")	5:44
12.	"When Will They Come??"		2:17
13.	"Somebody Cares About the Maestro"		2:01
14.	"Rocket Man" (Elton John cover)	Elton John, Bernie Taupin	4:59
Total length:			39:58

=== Personnel ===
My Morning Jacket

- Jim James – vocals, guitar, bass, drums, keyboards, production
- Johnny Quaid – guitar on track 1
- Two Tone Tommy – bass on track 1
- J. Glenn – drums on track 1

Additional

- Danny Cash – graphic design

== Learning ==
=== Track listing ===
All tracks are written by Jim James, except where noted.

No.	Title	Writer(s)	Length
1.	"Tonite I Want 2 Celebrate W/ You!"		2:26
2.	"Just One Thing" (Demo)		2:32
3.	"Take My Breath Away!" (Berlin cover)	Giorgio Moroder, Tom Whitlock	5:57
4.	"West End Girls" (Pet Shop Boys cover)	Chris Lowe, Neil Tennant	5:34
5.	"Dream a Lil Dream O' Me" (cover of The Mamas & The Papas version)	Fabian Andre, Gus Kahn, Wilbur Schwandt	4:28
6.	"Death Is the Easy Way" (Demo)		3:13
7.	"Bermuda Hwy" (Live)		3:35
8.	"Nothing 2 Me"		3:04
9.	"I Won't Cry!"		2:26
10.	"Why Don't U Love Me" (Hank Williams cover)	Hank Williams	4:08
11.	"That Someone Else Was You"		2:12
12.	"Tyrone" (Erykah Badu cover)	Erykah Badu, Norman Hurt	5:12
13.	"I Will Be There When You Die/Sunrides and the Girls Scream" (Live)		5:15
14.	"Good Nights and Happy Trails!!!!!"		3:07
Total length:			53:09

=== Personnel ===
My Morning Jacket

- Jim James – vocals, guitar, production
- Carl Broemel – guitar
- Two Tone Tommy – bass
- Bo Koster – keyboards
- J. Glenn – drums

Additional

- Danny Cash – bass, keyboards, graphic design
