= The Waterfall (album) =

Studio album by My Morning Jacket
- Released: May 4, 2015
- Recorded: 2013–2014
- Studios: Panoramic House (Stinson Beach, California); Flora Recording & Playback (Portland, Oregon); La La Land, Removador Fun Ranch (Louisville, Kentucky); In Heaven Recording Studios
- Genres: Indie rock; psychedelic rock
- Length: 47:50
- Labels: ATO; Capitol
- Producers: Tucker Martine; Jim James

My Morning Jacket chronology
Circuital (2011)	The Waterfall (2015)	The Waterfall II (2020)

Singles from The Waterfall
- 1. "Big Decisions" Released: March 2, 2015; 2. "Spring (Among the Living)" Released: March 31, 2015; 3. "Compound Fracture" Released: September 31, 2015

The Waterfall is the seventh studio album by American rock band My Morning Jacket. Produced by Tucker Martine and group frontman Jim James, the album was released on May 4, 2015, by ATO Records and Capitol Records. After touring 2011’s Circuital for two years, the band took a break before regrouping in late 2013 to begin work on The Waterfall, a process which took eighteen months.

Much of The Waterfall was recorded at a hilltop studio located Stinson Beach, California, where the band rented seaside homes while recording. Many elements of the album—from its tone to the album art—are heavily indebted to the area and its nature. James mostly brought unfinished lyrics to the group to create a spontaneous development process. In addition, he suffered a back injury during the sessions that hindered its production. His lyrics, likewise, document injury, romance and heartbreak, and spirituality, but center most on renewal. The album's music encompasses several genres, including folk, R&B, and psychedelia.

The album received favorable reviews from music critics, who considered it an improvement on their previous two albums. It debuted at number 11 on the Billboard 200 in the U.S., and represented career bests in several countries' national album charts. To promote the record, murals of a waterfall were painted on buildings in several U.S. cities, including Los Angeles and Chicago. The group founded a philanthropic organization named after the album to support environmental causes. My Morning Jacket supported the record with a large summer tour, spanning five months and featuring appearances at theaters and festivals.

Outtakes for this release were repurposed into 2020's The Waterfall II.

== Background ==
My Morning Jacket—consisting of singer-songwriter Jim James, guitarist Carl Broemel, bassist Tom Blankenship, drummer Patrick Hallahan, and keyboardist Bo Koster—formed in 1997 and rose to fame in the mid-2000s with their fourth album Z, which represented a critical and commercial breakthrough for the band. The band became known for mixing various genres with their country and rock sound, and were praised for their live performances, including a revered performance at music festival Bonnaroo in 2008. The group subsequently released a fifth record, Evil Urges, that received a polarized response. Their sixth release, Circuital (2011), became their highest-charting album on national charts and received acclaim.

The band toured for two years in support of Circuital. In 2013, they embarked on a tour alongside Wilco and Bob Dylan that left them disappointed, as they had falsely been told Dylan desired to work with them. While the band took a break, James stayed busy, touring behind his solo album, Regions of Light and Sound of God, and collaborating with Elvis Costello and Marcus Mumford for the New Basement Tapes project. These individual side projects, rather than detach the musicians, worked to strengthen their skill as musicians, according to Blankenship. This led to a greater appreciation of the group upon their return to it.

== Recording and production ==
"There was nobody for miles and miles, like a deserted paradise. At night, it was like you were inside the sky, the stars right next to your head."

— Jim James on Stinson Beach

The Waterfall was mainly recorded at Panoramic House, a hilltop mansion in the coastal town of Stinson Beach, California. The band felt the surroundings were "slightly supernatural," which produced a largely idyllic recording process. The group rented two houses on the seaside, and would "record during the day, then cook dinner together and walk on the beach." These long walks to and from the studio was "no better way to defragment your mind than to let it wander off in the air, up in the treetops and gliding along the waves," according to Blankenship. James found himself inspired and "hypnotized" by being able to view the ocean from large windows. He likened the experience to having their "own little universe" where they could simply make music and experience nature, calling the entire process a "beautiful experience." Their time there left them with a strong affinity for the area, and it profoundly impacted the album's tone; Blankenship remarked, "When I listen to the record it [...] sounds like a sunset out there."

The band first began recording in late 2013, and took eighteen months to complete. For the album, the band reunited with producer Tucker Martine, who also worked on Circuital. The band approached creating the album with a sense of freedom, with the "mantra" being "anything goes, no stone unturned, it'll be done when it’s done." James wrote most of the songs on The Waterfall in the group's hometown of Louisville, but later noted that his time in Stinson Beach affected each song in spirit. James recorded demos of songs via voice memos on his smartphone to present to the band, but refrained from rehearsing songs to create spontaneity. The band would unwind from recording by their longstanding recording tradition: "late night DJ party/Nintendo Ice Hockey tournament."

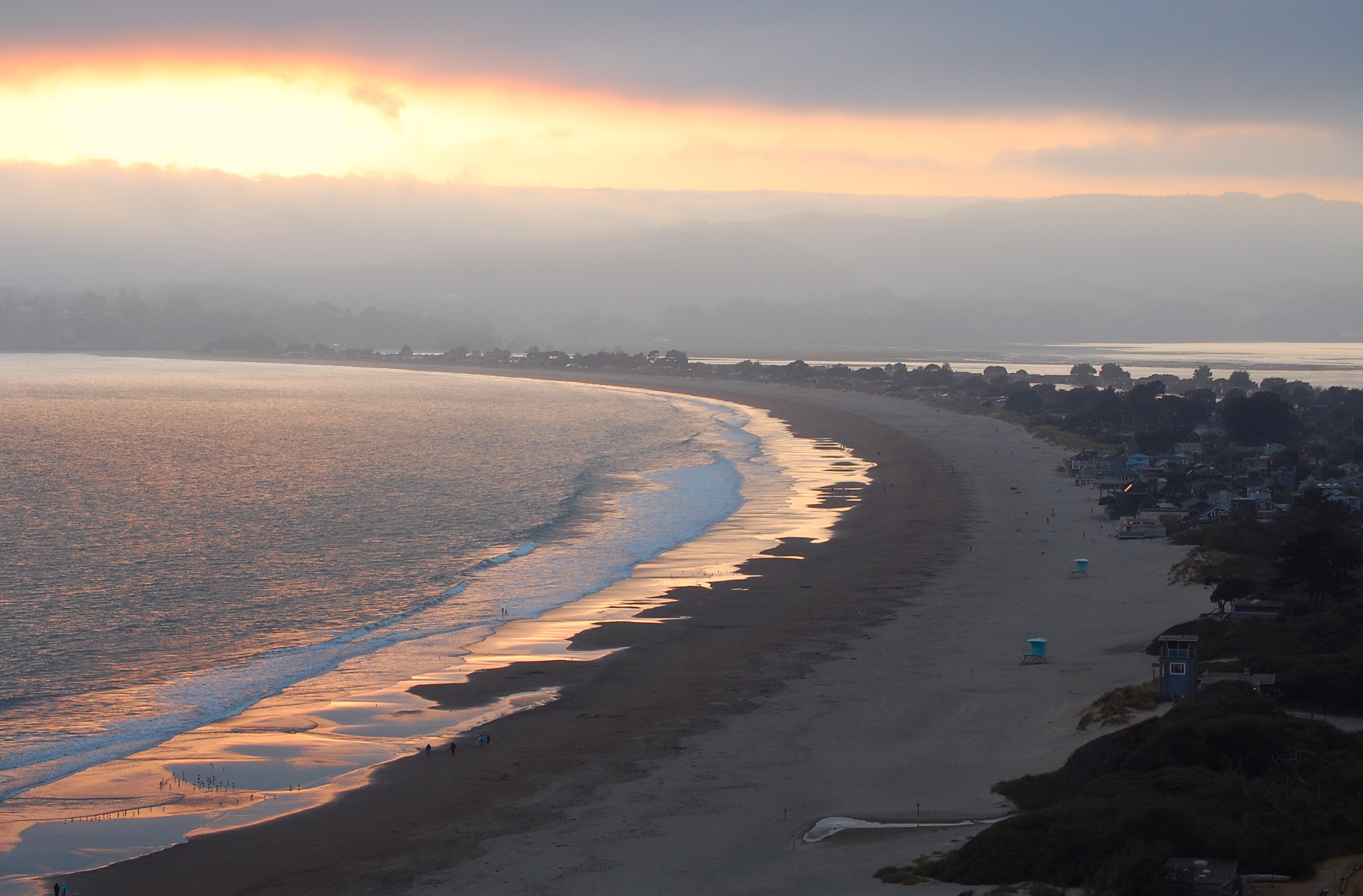
A sunset on the shores of Stinson Beach, California in 2013, where the band lived and recorded.

The sessions were marred by James' back injury, which he discovered while moving an amplifier. He spent three days in bed "in agony," before returning to record with the band. To record songs, James often had to lay on a couch. He considered the injury the result of "being unkind to my body" while on various tours. He eventually turned to surgery to repair his herniated disc, and following two months' rest, rejoined the group with more songs.

While previous albums by the band were recorded to tape, The Waterfall was recorded digitally. This allowed James to splice together recordings liberally, sometimes harkening back to pieces he had recorded years before. In addition to the Stinson Beach recordings, the band worked on The Waterfall at Flora, Martine's Portland studio, La La Land and Removador Fun Ranch (James' home studio) in Louisville, and In Heaven Recording Studios. The sessions were fruitful, producing over 24 completed songs, enough to fill two albums. Consequently, the band planned to release a second album of material in 2016, although material for that album was incomplete at the release of The Waterfall. This was decided when the band returned to their hometown of Louisville to re-record "Big Decisions" and record "Believe". James felt it unnecessary to compile the two as a double album, instead viewing the two as very separate entities. The band eventually completed and released the second album in 2020 as their eighth studio album, The Waterfall II.

== Composition ==
The Waterfall "exploring love, loss, philosophical statements, and naturalistic imagery," while its musical contents are diverse, consisting of "existentialist R&B, nature-boy folk, wigged-out psychedelia, and jam-friendly arena rock." The title "is a metaphor for how life is constantly beating you down, and you really have to take time to stop it and get through." Likewise, the album's central theme is rebirth and renewal.

James joked that his own personal confusion was the source of much of the album's lyrics. "I feel like I still don't know how to explain anything, but I have accepted that, I guess, and I'm just trying to live," he said. "Believe (Nobody Knows)" touches on spirituality and concludes that belief in a higher power is wholly good so long as it does not inspire evil. It was an extension of James' belief that religion causes enormous harm to society and is gripped with "chaos and greed," but that it should not deter a person from believing, as "nobody knows." The song was the last recorded for the album, and was set as the opening track to set a positive tone. "In Its Infancy (The Waterfall)" evolved from James' fascination with creating a song built from unrelated elements. The song was created in various pieces over time.

Much of The Waterfall is concerned with "lovelorn melancholy," the result of a breakup James experienced. Despite this, only two songs explicitly reflect the heartbreak, "Get the Point" and "Only Memories Remain". "Spring (Among the Living)" contains various sections of collage created by James on his personal laptop. These additions initially received a mixed response from the rest of the group, as it did not come "organically" from the band as a whole. "Thin Line" is the oldest song on the album, dating to "five or six" years prior to its inclusion. James had ceased working on the song when he could not complete it, but it was revived when Blankenship found an additional riff on his computer for the song. "Big Decisions" is about people refraining to change things in their lives that make them unhappy.

== Artwork ==
The album artwork for The Waterfall depicts Vernal Fall in Yosemite National Park. James had been collecting photographs of waterfalls, but they were all in black and white. He partnered with Neil Krug, who also directed artwork for his solo album, Regions of Light and Sound of God, to color the image. Its bright, peaceful tone was inspired by Stinson Beach and its surroundings. Blankenship expanded upon this in an interview:

[It's related to] being connected to nature. Literally being surrounded by trees and creatures every time we walked out of the studio doors. Every evening around sunset we would stop what we were doing and walk outside to watch the sun descend, like an enormous egg yolk slowly smashing down in a psychedelic wash of color, much like the colors of the waterfall on the album cover. Those images, the smell of ocean air and the openness of it all, seeped into every aspect of this record.

== Release ==
The group announced The Waterfall in March 2015, sharing its cover art, track listing, and its lead single, "Big Decisions". ATO, the band's longtime label, entered into a partnership with Capitol Records, who co-distributed the album. To promote the album, the band enlisted artists to paint murals of a waterfall on the side of buildings in five U.S. cities: Venice, Chicago, Williamsburg, Nashville, and Portland, Louisville. The group partnered with Portland Investment Initiative and Beautify Earth for the stunt, as a part of their own environmental campaign, The Waterfall Project.

== Commercial performance ==
The Waterfall debuted at number 11 on the Billboard 200 in the U.S., with 33,000 copies sold in its first week. They also reached a career best of number two on the Top Rock Albums chart. In Canada, the album was twentieth best-selling album of its release week. On the UK Albums Chart, the group reached a career best of position 42. Its chart performance elsewhere was low, with the highest being in Sweden, where the release charted at number 38.

== Critical reception ==
Professional ratings
Aggregate scores
Source	Rating
AnyDecentMusic?	7.4/10
Metacritic	78/100
Review scores
Source	Rating
AllMusic	3/5 stars
American Songwriter	4/5 stars
The A.V. Club	B
Consequence of Sound	B
The Guardian	4/5 stars
The Independent	4/5 stars
Pitchfork	7.9/10
Record Collector	4/5 stars
Rolling Stone	3.5/5 stars
Slant Magazine	3/5 stars

The Waterfall received largely positive reviews from contemporary music critics. At Metacritic, which assigns a normalized rating out of 100 to reviews from mainstream critics, the album received an average score of 78, based on 30 reviews, which indicates "generally favorable reviews".

Will Hermes of Rolling Stone imagined it "the band's sunniest, and trippiest, album," giving acclaim to their ability to "tap the past without sounding like throwbacks." The Guardian's Jon Dennis deemed it "big-canvas country-rock with spellbinding moments" with a "warm glow" missing from previous albums by the group. Pitchfork Media's Ian Cohen said that it "gets close to greatness," praising James' "remarkably level-headed and pragmatic" lyricism. Nate Chinen of The New York Times called it a "consolidation of [the band's] strengths," opining that a "hum of an everyday mysticism [...] resonates louder than usual" on The Waterfall. The A.V. Club's Lior Phillips claimed that the album "might not be a classic, but it still suggests that after nearly two decades fans don’t know every side of My Morning Jacket. Luckily, they keep opening new doors for us to explore."

Stephen Deusner of Salon said it "may be the Louisville band’s best, most ambitious, and most nuanced effort in more than a decade, a musically inventive and lyrically nuanced collection that isn’t quite a concept album, but plays like one." Hal Horowitz of American Songwriter felt it "one of the band’s finest and most alluring offerings to date," noting the album's tranquil but passionate atmosphere. NPR's Meredith Ochs wrote that "in a gentler sense, the music itself is kind of like a waterfall—cascading notes, opaque layers of sound, and rippling arrangements that can bend or break the verse-chorus structure of traditional rock songs." The Boston Globe's Steve Morse called it the group's "most serious, progressive LP," praising its "musical brilliance" while deeming James' lyricism "odd."

Sheldon Pearce of Consequence of Sound gave the record a B, commenting, "My Morning Jacket harken back to their alt country roots on The Waterfall and create a remarkable vision of the American countryside in the process, one as filled with solitude as it is with wonder." "Always prey to their psychedelic tendencies, here MMJ swallow the full tab and dive headfirst into a whirlpool of supposition, analogy and swirling guitar," wrote Andy Gill of The Independent. Mark Deming of AllMusic wrote that the album "quickly loses focus and runs short of energy, the latter being this set's crippling flaw." Jeremy Winograd of Slant Magazine felt the band's style diversions "alternately inventive and bafflingly blockheaded," concluding that the group may be "at their best when operating safely within less experimental paradigms."

== Touring ==
The band began touring in support of The Waterfall in May 2015, starting out at the historic Georgia Theatre in Athens, Georgia. The tour spans much of the summer and early fall 2015, and includes appearances at large festivals (Governors Ball and Bonnaroo) as well as headlining shows. It concluded in September 2015 in Berlin.

== Track listing ==
All tracks are written by Jim James, except where noted.

No.	Title	Writer(s)	Length
1.	"Believe (Nobody Knows)"		4:53
2.	"Compound Fracture"		3:43
3.	"Like a River"		4:50
4.	"In Its Infancy (The Waterfall)"		5:10
5.	"Get the Point"		3:00
6.	"Spring (Among the Living)"		6:00
7.	"Thin Line"		4:02
8.	"Big Decisions"	Jim James and Dan Wilson	3:52
9.	"Tropics (Erase Traces)"		5:10
10.	"Only Memories Remain"		7:10
Total length:			47:50

== Personnel ==
Credits adapted from The Waterfall liner notes.

My Morning Jacket

- Tom Blankenship – bass guitar
- Carl Broemel – guitar, backing vocals
- Patrick Hallahan – drums
- Jim James – guitar, lead vocals, artwork, production
- Bo Koster – keyboards, backing vocals

Additional musicians

- Anna Fritz – backing vocals, strings
- Merrill Garbus – backing vocals
- Brittany Howard – backing vocals
- Kyleen King – backing vocals, strings
- Patti King – backing vocals, strings

Artwork

- Danny Cash – layout
- Neil Krug – artwork

Production

- Michael Finn – recording engineer, additional keyboards on "Believe (Nobody Knows)"
- Tucker Martine – production, mixing engineer, recorded by, additional percussion on "Believe (Nobody Knows)"
- Bob Ludwig – mastering engineer
- Kevin Ratterman – recording engineer, additional sequencing on "Compound Fracture"

== Charts ==
=== Weekly charts ===
Weekly chart performance for The Waterfall
Chart (2015)	Peak position
Australian Albums (ARIA)	69
Belgian Albums (Ultratop Wallonia)	49
Belgian Albums (Ultratop Flanders)	53
Canadian Albums (Billboard)	20
Dutch Albums (Album Top 100)	48
Spanish Albums (Promusicae)	82
Swedish Albums (Sverigetopplistan)	38
UK Albums (Official Charts)	42
US Billboard 200	11
US Top Alternative Albums (Billboard)	2
US Top Rock Albums (Billboard)	2

=== Year-end charts ===
Year-end chart performance for The Waterfall
Chart (2015)	Position
US Top Rock Albums (Billboard)	68
