= One Big Holiday =

Single by My Morning Jacket

Single by My Morning Jacket

from the album It Still Moves
- Released: 2004
- Studio: Above the Cadillac Studios, Shelbyville, Kentucky
- Genre: Indie rock; Southern rock
- Length: 5:21
- Label: ATO
- Songwriter: Jim James
- Producer: Jim James

My Morning Jacket singles chronology
| "Mahgeetah" (2003) | "One Big Holiday" (2004) | "Golden" (2004) |

"One Big Holiday" is a song by American rock band My Morning Jacket and is featured on their 2003 album It Still Moves. It is also featured on the band's 2006 live concert CD and DVD Okonokos. It is their best-known song, behind "I'm Amazed".

== Overview ==
Despite a lack of radio airplay the track has achieved some notability, which could be the result of several live performances, most notably on Late Night with Conan O'Brien as well as several performances at the Bonnaroo Music Festival. Its signature guitar riff and the lyrics, telling the story of the band being "discovered", continue to make it a staple of live performances.

The song has made appearances on several soundtracks, most notably the 2007 film The Lookout and the 2006 film Stick It. The song also was featured in episode 6, season 4 of the Fox medical drama House.

The song is a playable track in Guitar Hero 5 and a downloadable track in Rock Band 4.

A remixed and remastered version of the song was released in 2016 in promotion of the deluxe edition of It Still Moves.

== Track listing ==
| No. | Title | Length |
|---|---|---|
| 1. | "One Big Holiday" (radio edit) | 4:03 |
| 2. | "One Big Holiday" | 5:24 |
| 3. | "One Big Holiday" (Live) | 4:14 |

== Personnel ==
- Jim James – vocals, guitar
- Johnny Quaid – guitar
- Tom Blankenship – bass
- Danny Cash – keyboards
- Patrick Hallahan – drums
