= Bo Koster =

American musician

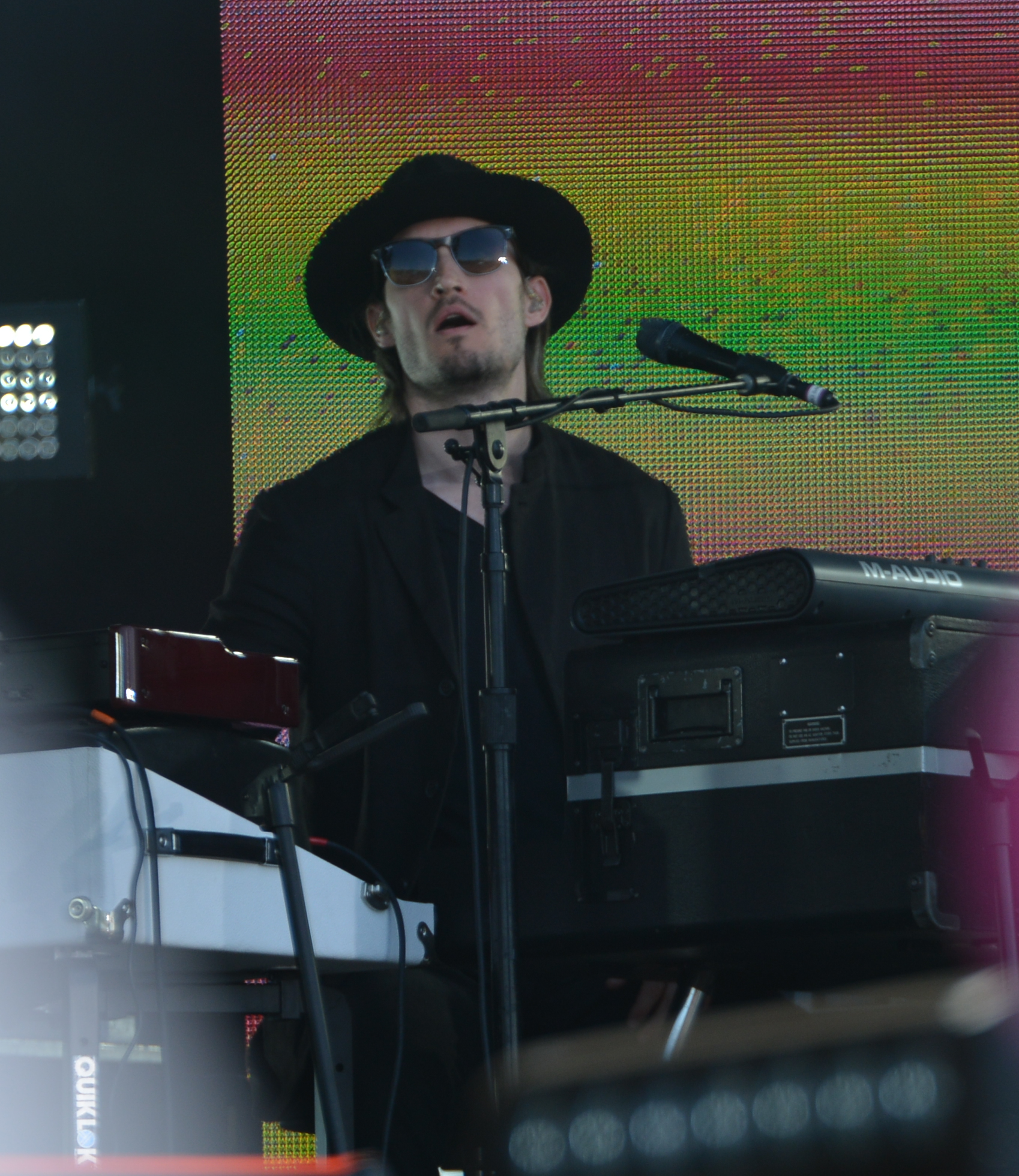
Koster with My Morning Jacket in 2015

Bo Koster (born August 22, 1974) is an American keyboardist and record producer. He is best known for his work as a member of the band My Morning Jacket and as a touring musician with Roger Waters and Ray LaMontagne.

== Early life ==
Koster grew up in Lakewood, Ohio, a city in the Greater Cleveland Metropolitan Area. He attended Lakewood High School, Cleveland Institute of Music and Berklee College of Music.

== Career ==
=== My Morning Jacket ===
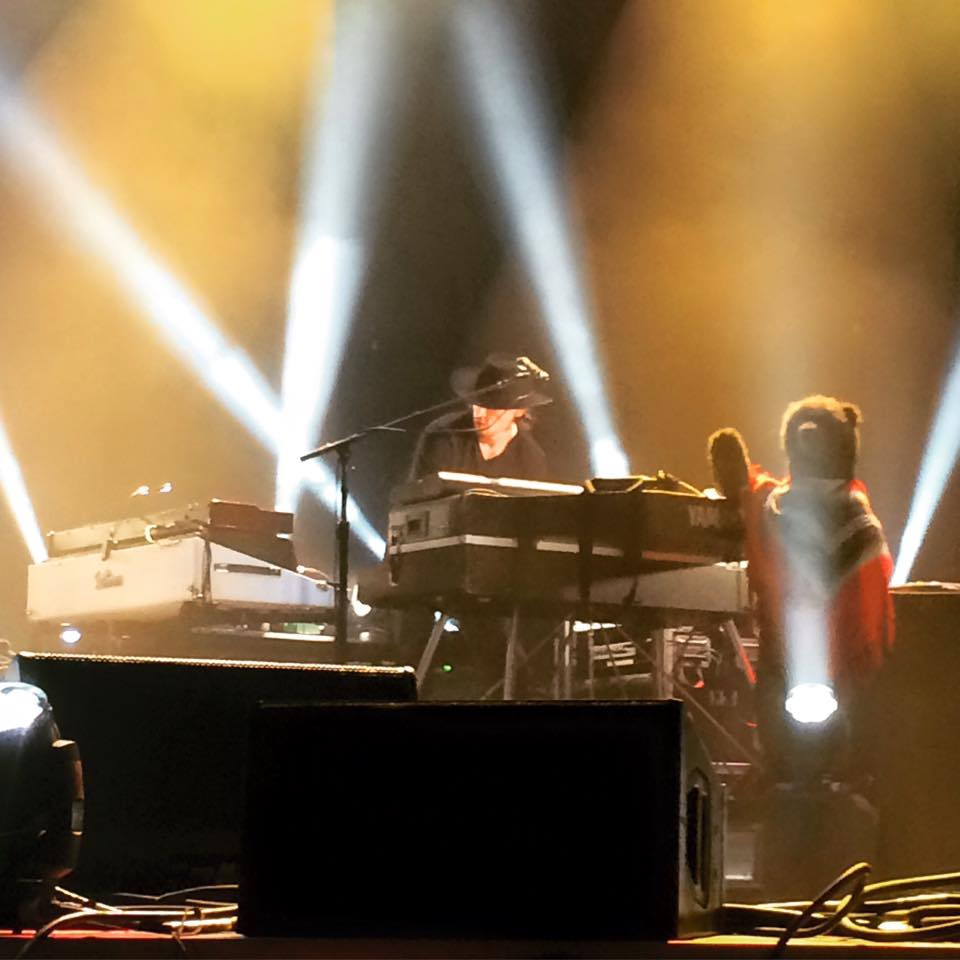
Koster performs 2015 with My Morning Jacket at Forecastle Festival.

In 2003, Koster became a member of the band My Morning Jacket. The band's sound, rooted in rock, alternative, and alt-country, is often experimental and psychedelic. The group amassed a large following beginning in the early 2000s, in part due to their powerful live performances. In 2005, their album Z was universally acclaimed as one of the best albums of that year. The band has also been nominated for a Grammy three times in the Best Alternative Music Album category.

=== Roger Waters ===
In 2017 and 2018, Koster was part of the Roger Waters Us + Them world tour and subsequently appeared in the companion film Us + Them. He had previously performed with Waters when My Morning Jacket backed him at the Newport Folk Festival in 2015.

=== Ray LaMontagne ===
In 2016, he joined Ray LaMontagne and other members of My Morning Jacket for the Ouroborous tour. Later, in 2018, he appeared on LaMontagne's album Part Of The Light.

=== Other work ===
Koster has also collaborated with Neko Case, T Bone Burnett, City & Colour, Strand Of Oaks, Carl Broemel, Young The Giant, Laura Viers, Sam Outlaw, and Delta Spirit. In 2010, he co-produced the Delta Spirit album History from Below.

Prior to joining My Morning Jacket, Koster worked on several television documentaries as an associate producer, including Modern Marvels and Haunted History.

== Personal life ==
Koster is an avid basketball fan, especially of his hometown team the Cleveland Cavaliers. He currently resides in Los Angeles, CA.

== Discography ==
=== With My Morning Jacket ===
- Z (2005)
- Okonokos (2006)
- Evil Urges (2008)
- Circuital (2011)
- The Waterfall (2015)
- The Waterfall II (2020)
- My Morning Jacket (2021)
- Is (2025)
