= Is (My Morning Jacket album) =

2025 album by My Morning Jacket

Studio album by My Morning Jacket
- Released: March 21, 2025
- Studio: Henson
- Genre: Rock indie rock
- Length: 39:01
- Label: ATO
- Producer: Brendan O'Brien

My Morning Jacket chronology
My Morning Jacket (2021)	Is (2025)

Singles from Is
- 1. "Time Waited" Released: January 15, 2025; 2. "Squid Ink" Released: February 11, 2025; 3. "Half a Lifetime" Released: March 18, 2025

Is (stylized in lowercase) is the tenth studio album by the American rock band My Morning Jacket. The album was recorded at Henson Recording Studios with the record producer Brendan O'Brien, and released on March 21, 2025, by ATO Records to critical acclaim.

== Background and release ==
Is, the tenth studio album of the American rock band My Morning Jacket, follows their 2021 self-produced eponymous record. The band worked across two sessions to write the album, producing over 100 demo tracks. The album was recorded at Henson Recording Studios, where the band worked with an outside producer, Brendan O'Brien. The album was preceded by three singles: "Time Waited", "Squid Ink", and "Half a Lifetime", which the band began working on for its 2005 album Z. ATO released the album on March 21, 2025.

== Critical reception ==
Professional ratings
Aggregate scores
Source	Rating
AnyDecentMusic?	7.2/10
Metacritic	79/100
Review scores
Source	Rating
AllMusic	4/5 stars
Hot Press	8/10
Mojo	4/5 stars
Pitchfork	6.0/10
PopMatters	7/10
Record Collector	4/5 stars
Rolling Stone	3.5/5 stars
Sputnikmusic	3.3/5
Uncut	9/10

According to the review aggregator Metacritic, Is received "generally favorable reviews" based on a weighted average score of 79 out of 100 from 10 critic scores. Critics praised the album's production. Scott Bauer in the Associated Press wrote that the producer Brendan O'Brien helped to "focus the band" in creating a coherent record. Likewise, Jon Dolan in Rolling Stone said that O'Brien produced "concise results", praising the album's "economy and texture" as well as its "restraint" on tracks like "I Can Hear Your Love", comparing James' vocals to Roy Orbison. Record Collector and Tom Doyle in Mojo said that O'Brien's production helped to sharpen the band's sound. In Uncut, Bud Scoppa said that "the unlikely collaboration has yielded the quintet's most vibrant album in two decades". The pseudonymous staff reviewer Sunnyvale rated the album 3.3 out of 5 for Sputnikmusic, writing that while it provides a "steady diet of accessible pop rock", the band appeared to be "resting on laurels".

== Track listing ==
All tracks are written by Jim James.

No.	Title	Length
1.	"Out in the Open"	4:11
2.	"Half a Lifetime"	3:20
3.	"Everyday Magic"	4:21
4.	"I Can Hear Your Love"	3:05
5.	"Time Waited"	3:39
6.	"Beginning from the Ending"	4:59
7.	"Lemme Know"	3:07
8.	"Squid Ink"	3:19
9.	"Die for It"	4:04
10.	"River Road"	4:52
Total length:		39:01

== Personnel ==
My Morning Jacket

- Jim James – vocals, guitar (all tracks); programming (1, 4, 6, 7)
- Tom Blankenship – bass guitar (all tracks), guitar (3), background vocals (7, 8)
- Patrick Hallahan – drums (all tracks), background vocals (7)
- Bo Koster – keyboards (all tracks), background vocals (7)
- Carl Broemel – guitar (all tracks), background vocals (2, 7)

Additional contributors

- Brendan O'Brien – production, mixing (all tracks); synthesizer (track 1)
- Mert Ozcan – immersive mix engineering
- Emily Lazar – immersive mastering
- Bob DeMaa – immersive mastering
- Kyle Stevens – recording
- Tommy Turner – recording assistance

== Charts ==
Chart performance for Is
Chart (2025)	Peak position
US Billboard 200	111
US Top Album Sales (Billboard)	6
US Independent Albums (Billboard)	20
US Top Rock Albums (Billboard)	19
US Top Rock & Alternative Albums (Billboard)	24
Scottish Albums (Official Charts)	41
UK Albums Sales (OCC)	32
UK Americana Albums (Official Charts)	9
UK Independent Albums (Official Charts)	18
