= Live from Las Vegas =

Live from Las Vegas may refer to:

- Britney Spears Live from Las Vegas, a DVD collection from pop music singer Britney Spears
- Live from Las Vegas (Frank Sinatra album), a 2005 live album by the American singer Frank Sinatra
- Live from Las Vegas (Dean Martin album), a live album of a 1967 performance by Dean Martin at the Sands Hotel in Las Vegas, released in 2005
- Live from Las Vegas, album from Nancy Wilson discography 2005

== See also ==
- iTunes Live from Las Vegas at the Palms (Yellowcard album), a live album by American pop punk band Yellowcard, recorded 2007 and released 2008
- iTunes Live from Las Vegas Exclusively at the Palms, a live album by the indie rock band My Morning Jacket released 2009
- Live in Las Vegas (disambiguation)
