= My Morning Jacket Does Xmas Fiasco Style =

EP by My Morning Jacket
- Released: October 2000
- Genre: Rock
- Length: 34:45
- Label: Darla Records (US) / Pias (Benelux)
- Producer: Jim James

My Morning Jacket chronology
My Morning Jacket Does Xmas Fiasco Style (2000)	It Still Moves (2003)

My Morning Jacket Does Xmas Fiasco Style is a 2000 EP by the rock band My Morning Jacket, containing Christmas songs. Its alternate title is We Wish You a Merry Christmas and a Happy New Year!

== Track listing ==
All songs by Jim James unless noted.

1. "X Mas Curtain" – 4:54
2. "I Just Wanted to Say" – 6:29
3. "Xmas Time Is Here Again" (Jim James, Ben Blanford & Dave Givan) – 6:16
4. "New Morning" (Nick Cave) – 4:07
5. "Santa Claus Is Back in Town" (Jerry Leiber and Mike Stoller) – 5:38
  - Hidden Track – 7:21

Digital bonus tracks

1. "All This Joy Brings Different Feelings" – 2:57
2. "Xmas Song" – 2:16
