= Ruben Rojas =

Los Angeles contemporary and urban artist

- Movement: Contemporary art, urban art, design
- Website: rubenrojas.com

Ruben Rojas is a Santa Monica-based contemporary artist and designer known for his "Live Through Love" campaign and for co-founding the nonprofit company, Beautify Earth. In 2017, Rojas was included in CBS Los Angeles' list of "Best Los Angeles Artists You Need To Know About," and later that year, the artist gave a TEDx talk about the regenerative power of outdoor art.

== Early life ==
Rojas grew up in Panorama City and was a three sport athlete. Early in his career, Rojas trained to become an orthopedic surgeon and worked in real estate. After a decade feeling unfulfilled working in the corporate world, Rojas shifted his focus to art.

== Beautify Earth ==
In 2013, Evan Meyer and Rojas co-founded the nonprofit to visually enrich their Santa Monica neighborhood and give back to their community through murals. The organization was initially inspired by the spirit of the Burning Man festival and the revitalization efforts of the Wynwood Art District in Miami, Florida. To date, the organization has facilitated the placement of over 120 murals in Santa Monica and has expanded to other locations such as Seattle, Brooklyn, Mexico and India. Beautify Earth has worked with clients including Zappos, American Express and Lexus who are interested in enhancing their viewership and social media engagement through outdoor art.

== "Live Through Love" ==
In 2013, the same year he co-founded Beautify Earth, Rojas conceptualized his "Live Through Love" art and design campaign. Rojas' intention for the project is to use art as a tool in service of social and personal change. His signature style involves repetition of the word love in different colors in his handwriting.

In 2019, Rojas launched his apparel line, promoting the same messages of his murals through clothing. In 2020, Rojas' mask design was highlighted in the Los Angeles Times as being a fashionable way to stay safe during the COVID-19 pandemic.

=== Charitable partnerships ===
In 2019, Rojas created a T-shirt with a message that reads, "You can't quarantine love," donating proceeds to the United Way Los Angeles Pandemic Relief Fund. That same year, the artist partnered with ABC7 to design a shirt to raise awareness and funds for people experiencing food insecurity, donating sale proceeds to the Feed SoCal campaign.

=== Brand partnerships ===
Rojas has partnered with several brands, including BMW, Toms Shoes, Reebok and Our/Los Angeles distillery.
