= Live in Las Vegas =

Live in Las Vegas or Live in Vegas may refer to:

- Family Guy: Live in Vegas
- Live in Las Vegas (Macy Gray album)
- Live in Las Vegas (Al Jardine album)
- Tom Jones Live in Las Vegas, 1969 live album by Tom Jones
- Live in Las Vegas (Dave Matthews & Tim Reynolds album)
- Live in Las Vegas (Elvis Presley album)
- Live in Las Vegas, NV by Jimmy Buffett
- Phish: Live in Vegas

== See also ==
- Live at The Venetian – Las Vegas by the Blue Man Group
- Live from Las Vegas (disambiguation)
