= Holdin on to Black Metal =

2011 song by My Morning Jacket

Single by My Morning Jacket

from the album Circuital
- Released: March 4, 2011
- Genre: Indie rock; jazz rock
- Label: ATO
- Songwriter: Jim James
- Producers: Jim James; Tucker Martine

My Morning Jacket singles chronology
"I'm Amazed" (2008)	"Holdin on to Black Metal" (2011)	"The Day Is Coming" (2011)

"Holdin on to Black Metal" is a song by American rock band My Morning Jacket, published by ATO Records in 2011.

== Formats and track listings ==
CD single
No.	Title	Length
1.	"Holdin on to Black Metal"	4:21
2.	"Butch Cassidy" (Live at T5)	4:30
Total length:		8:51

== Charts ==
Chart (2011)	Peak position
US Alternative Airplay (Billboard)	36
US Hot Rock & Alternative Songs (Billboard)	48
