= Heartbreakin Man =

EP by My Morning Jacket
- Released: May 2000
- Genre: Indie rock
- Label: Darla Records

My Morning Jacket chronology
The Tennessee Fire (1999)	Heartbreakin Man (2000)	My Morning Jacket Does Bad Jazz (2000)

Heartbreakin Man is an EP from the Louisville indie rock band My Morning Jacket. It was released in May 2000 by Darla Records; it was made available as a free iTunes download in 2004.

== Critical reception ==
The Village Voice panned the EP, describing it as "six wet noodles." Rolling Stone deemed the title track "dreamy R.E.M.-like jangle."

== Track listing ==
1. Heartbreakin Man – 3:11
2. Old Sept. Blues (ga-ed out version) – 5:43
3. They Ran (acoustic) – 3:32
4. Evelyn Is Not Real (be-mixed) – 2:30
5. R.I.P.V.G. – 2:19
6. Tonite I Want To Celebrate With You – 2:26

== Notes ==
1. Track 1 taken from "The Tennessee Fire"
2. Track 2 taken from "LoladaMusica" (Recorded live in the Netherlands, January 2000)
3. Track 3 taken from "Zondagskint" (Radio 3FM – the Netherlands, April 9, 2000)
4. Tracks 4–6 taken from the bonus 7" single, included with first vinyl pressings of "The Tennessee Fire"
