= Big Decisions =

Single by My Morning Jacket

Single by My Morning Jacket

from the album The Waterfall
- Released: March 2, 2015
- Recorded: 2013–14
- Genre: Alternative rock; alternative country
- Length: 3:53
- Label: ATO; Capitol
- Songwriters: Jim James; Dan Wilson
- Producers: Jim James; Tucker Martine

My Morning Jacket singles chronology
"This Land Is Your Land" (2014)	"Big Decisions" (2015)	"Spring (Among the Living)" (2015)

"Big Decisions" is a song by American rock band My Morning Jacket for its seventh studio album, The Waterfall (2015). It was released as the lead single from the record on March 2, 2015.

It represents the group's highest peak on the Adult Alternative Songs chart in the U.S., where it reached number seven.

== Background ==
"Big Decisions" is about people refraining to change things in their lives that make them unhappy. It was co-written by frontman Jim James and musician Dan Wilson. The band re-recorded the song in their hometown of Louisville.

== Formats and track listings ==
CD promo
No.	Title	Length
1.	"Big Decisions" (Album Edit)	3:53
2.	"Big Decisions" (Radio Mix)

== Charts ==
Chart (2015)	Peak position
US Adult Alternative Airplay (Billboard)	7
US Rock & Alternative Airplay (Billboard)	41
