= Okonokos =

Live album by My Morning Jacket
- Released: September 26, 2006
- Recorded: November 11–12, 2005 at The Fillmore, San Francisco, California
- Genre: Rock, psychedelic rock, country
- Length: 123:49
- Label: ATO Records
- Producer: Galea McGregor

My Morning Jacket chronology
Z (2005)	Okonokos (2006)	At Dawn/Tennessee Fire Demos Package (2007)

Professional ratings
Review scores
Source	Rating
AllMusic	4/5 stars
Mojo	3/5 stars
Pitchfork Media	7.2/10
Q	3/5 stars
Record Collector	5/5 stars
Rolling Stone	3.5/5 stars

Okonokos is a live album and concert film by the American band My Morning Jacket released on October 31, 2006. The album was recorded during the band's fall 2005 Z Tour, over two nights at The Fillmore in San Francisco, California. This is the first My Morning Jacket album for which frontman Jim James does not receive a production credit; he is credited for "concept/story".

== Album track listing ==
=== CD ===
==== Disc one ====
1. "Wordless Chorus" – 4:14
2. "It Beats 4 U" – 4:26
3. "Gideon" – 3:48
4. "One Big Holiday" – 5:56
5. "I Will Sing You Songs" – 8:38
6. "Lowdown" – 4:14
7. "The Way that He Sings" – 5:08
8. "What a Wonderful Man" – 2:59
9. "Off the Record" – 6:54
10. "Golden" – 4:51
11. "Lay Low" – 6:20

==== Disc two ====
1. "Dondante" – 11:18
2. "Run Thru" – 9:35
3. "At Dawn" – 3:05
4. "Xmas Curtain" – 5:02
5. "O Is the One that Is Real" – 3:36
6. "I Think I'm Going to Hell" – 5:16
7. "Steam Engine" – 11:07
8. "Dancefloors" – 5:15
9. "Anytime" – 4:03
10. "Mahgeetah" – 7:08

=== Vinyl box set ===
==== Record one ====
Side A:

1. "Wordless Chorus"
2. "It Beats 4 U"
3. "Gideon"
4. "One Big Holiday"

Side B:

1. "I Will Sing You Songs"
2. "Lowdown"
3. "The Way that He Sings"

==== Record two ====
Side A:

1. "At Dawn"
2. "Golden"
3. "What a Wonderful Man"
4. "Off the Record"

Side B:

1. "Lay Low"
2. "Dondante"

==== Record three ====
Side A:

1. "Run Thru"
2. "Xmas Curtain"
3. "O Is the One that Is Real"

Side B:

1. "Steam Engine"
2. "Dance Floors"

==== Record four ====
Side A:

1. "I Think I'm Going to Hell"
2. "Anytime"
3. "Mahgeetah"

Side B (bonus tracks):

1. "Where to Begin"
2. "Sooner"
3. "Strangulation"

== Concert film track listing ==
1. "The Party"
2. "Wordless Chorus"
3. "It Beats 4 U"
4. "Gideon"
5. "One Big Holiday"
6. "I Will Sing You Songs"
7. "Lowdown"
8. "The Way that He Sings"
9. "What a Wonderful Man"
10. "Off the Record"
11. "Golden"
12. "Lay Low"
13. "Dondante"
14. "Run Thru"
15. "Xmas Curtain"
16. "O Is the One that Is Real"
17. "Steam Engine"
18. "Anytime"
19. "Mahgeetah"
20. "The Attack"

== Acoustic Chorale ==
Select versions of Okonokos released in 2006 at certain independent record stores included a bonus DVD with video of six tracks. Despite the title, only the first track is acoustic.

1. "Bermuda Highway"
2. "At Dawn"
3. "Sooner"
4. "Where to Begin"
5. "I Think I'm Going to Hell"
6. "Strangulation"

== Personnel ==
My Morning Jacket

- Carl Broemel – guitar, pedal steel guitar, saxophone, vocals
- Patrick Hallahan – drums
- Jim James – vocals, guitar
- Bo Koster – keyboards, piano, percussion, looping, vocals
- "Two-Tone" Tommy – bass guitar

Other

- Bob Ludwig – mastering
- Galea McGregor – production
