= Acoustic Citsuoca =

EP by My Morning Jacket
- Released: May 4, 2004
- Recorded: October 2003
- Genre: Indie rock
- Length: 25:33
- Label: ATO Records

My Morning Jacket chronology
It Still Moves (2003)	Acoustic Citsuoca (2004)	Early Recordings: Chapter 1: The Sandworm Cometh (2004)

Professional ratings
Review scores
Source	Rating
Pitchfork	7.5/10

Acoustic Citsuoca is a 2004 EP by My Morning Jacket. The packaging claims it was recorded at the Startime Pavilion in Braintree, MA on October 31, 2003; however, no such venue exists, and that show did not, in fact, occur. When asked by a reporter about the circumstances of the EP's recording, given that no Startime Pavilion exists in Braintree, Jim James facetiously replied, "Well,…the Startime Pavilion was only open for one show. They tore it down after we played because we rocked so hard.…the structure couldn't take the impact of the rock, so they had to level it because of public safety concerns." The actual recording dates were October 17, 18, and 20, 2003, in Dallas, TX, Austin, TX, and Atlanta, GA.

This was the last release by the band to feature Johnny Quaid and Danny Cash, and James has said the EP is a "nod of appreciation" to both of them.

== Track listing ==
1. The Bear 5:14
2. Sooner 5:41
3. Bermuda Highway 3:39
4. Golden 5:59
5. Hopefully 5:05
6. By My Car (Vinyl only)
