= The Tennessee Fire =

Studio album by My Morning Jacket
- Released: May 25, 1999
- Studio: Ultrasuede Studios, Cincinnati, Ohio & Above the Cadillac Studios, Shelbyville, Kentucky
- Genre: Indie rock; alternative country
- Length: 57:25
- Label: Darla
- Producer: Todd Kaiser

My Morning Jacket chronology
The Tennessee Fire (1999)	At Dawn (2001)

Professional ratings
Review scores
Source	Rating
AllMusic	4/5 stars
Pitchfork	8.0/10

The Tennessee Fire is the debut album by the rock band My Morning Jacket. It introduced the reverb-heavy sound that is characteristic of the band's early material. This is most apparent in Jim James' vocals, many of which were recorded in an improvised studio above his cousin’s garage. Of the sixteen tracks on the album, only four were re-recorded in a professional studio prior to the album’s release: "Heartbreakin Man", "The Bear", "Evelyn Is Not Real" and "I Think I’m Going to Hell".

On August 2, 2019, a deluxe version of the album celebrating its 20th anniversary was released, featuring the original 16-track album alongside 16 additional previously unreleased and unheard tracks, demos, alternate versions and more.

== Track listing ==
All tracks are written by Jim James.

No.	Title	Length
1.	"Heartbreakin Man"	3:11
2.	"They Ran"	2:48
3.	"The Bear"	4:39
4.	"Nashville to Kentucky"	2:58
5.	"Old Sept. Blues"	2:28
6.	"If All Else Fails"	3:58
7.	"It's About Twilight Now"	4:06
8.	"Evelyn Is Not Real"	3:04
9.	"War Begun"	3:06
10.	"Picture of You"	3:16
11.	"I Will Be There When You Die"	4:42
12.	"The Dark"	3:22
13.	"By My Car"	4:04
14.	"Butch Cassidy"	3:55
15.	"I Think I'm Going to Hell"	5:06
16.	"Alabama Come Clean"	2:42
Total length:		57:25

“Alabama Come Clean” is a hidden track that isn’t listed on the original release.

== The Tennessee Fire: 20th Anniversary Edition ==
Disc 1 - Original Album

No.	Title	Length
1.	"Heartbreakin Man"	3:11
2.	"They Ran"	2:48
3.	"The Bear"	4:39
4.	"Nashville to Kentucky"	2:58
5.	"Old Sept Blues"	2:28
6.	"If All Else Fails"	3:58
7.	"It's About Twilight Now"	4:06
8.	"Evelyn Is Not Real"	3:04
9.	"War Begun"	3:06
10.	"Picture of You"	3:16
11.	"I Will Be There When You Die"	4:42
12.	"The Dark"	3:22
13.	"By My Car"	4:04
14.	"Butch Cassidy"	3:55
15.	"I Think I'm Going to Hell"	5:06
16.	"Untitled Instrumental" (Alabama Come Clean)	2:42

Disc 2 - Bonus Material

No.	Title	Length
1.	"John Dyes Her Hair Red"	3:34
2.	"Flew in on a Dead Horse"	3:54
3.	"Yellow and Strobe"	2:09
4.	"Lil Billy" (Demo)	3:05
5.	"Evelyn Is Not Real" (First Version)	3:00
6.	"All This Joy Brings Different Feelings"	2:53
7.	"Finger on the Frog"	2:43
8.	"Gifts"	4:10
9.	"Weeks Go By Like Days" (Alternate Version)	2:29
10.	"Plasma Ball"	2:58
11.	"Breathin' Afterbirth"	2:32
12.	"Heartbreakin' Man" (First Version)	3:27
13.	"I Think I'm Going to Hell" (Two Meter Session)	4:41
14.	"If All Else Fails" (First Version)	3:39
15.	"The Bear" (First Version)	3:55
16.	"The Bear" (Third Version)	4:38

== Personnel ==
- Jim James – vocals, guitars, harmonica & banjo
- Johnny Quaid – guitars
- Two Tone Tommy – bass
- J. Glenn – drums
