= Chocolate and Ice =

EP by My Morning Jacket
- Released: March 26, 2002
- Genre: Indie rock
- Length: 40:35
- Label: Badman Recording Co.

My Morning Jacket chronology
At Dawn (2001)	Chocolate and Ice (2002)	It Still Moves (2003)

Professional ratings
Review scores
Source	Rating
Allmusic	3/5 stars
Pitchfork Media	(7.3/10)

Chocolate and Ice is an EP from Louisville, Kentucky indie rock band My Morning Jacket. It was released on March 26, 2002, by Badman Recording Co. All the songs on the EP were written and performed by band leader Jim James, and no other band members appear on the album, with the exception of the track "It's Been a Great 3 Or 4 Years", a voicemail from his cousin, guitarist John McQuade (Johnny Quaid). The inside packaging indicates the album was mastered at Abbey Road Studios. Only "Sooner" and "Cobra" have become live favorites, with "Sweetheart" having only been performed in concert once, in 2006. As of 2021, "Can You See the Hard Helmet on My Head?" and "Holy" have never been performed live.

== Track listing ==
All songs by Jim James.

1. "Can You See The Hard Helmet On My Head?" – 3:43
2. "Sooner" – 3:37
3. "Cobra" – 24:12
4. "It's Been A Great 3 Or 4 Years" – 4:00
5. "Holy" – 1:59
6. "Sweetheart" – 3:04

== Personnel ==
- Jim James – Instruments and vocals
- Johnny Quaid – Vocal ("It's Been A Great 3 Or 4 Years")
