= I'm Amazed =

2008 single by My Morning Jacket

Single by My Morning Jacket

from the album Evil Urges
- B-side: "I'm Amazed" (radio edit)
- Released: May 2008
- Recorded: Avatar Studios, New York City November 2007
- Genre: Indie rock, neo-psychedelia
- Length: 4:35
- Label: ATO, Rough Trade
- Songwriter: Jim James
- Producers: Joe Chiccarelli and Jim James

My Morning Jacket singles chronology
| "Touch Me I'm Going to Scream Pt. 2" (2008) | "I'm Amazed" (2008) | "Holdin on to Black Metal" (2011) |

"I'm Amazed" is a single by My Morning Jacket off their album Evil Urges, released in 2008. The song was #8 on Rolling Stone's list of the 100 Best Songs of 2008. It is also one of their most successful singles to date, having a higher peak on the adult album alternative chart. They performed this song along with "Evil Urges" on Saturday Night Live on May 10, 2008.

== Track listing ==
US single
| No. | Title | Length |
|---|---|---|
| 1. | "I'm Amazed" (radio edit) | 3:56 |
| 2. | "I'm Amazed" (album version) | 4:35 |

UK promo single
| No. | Title | Length |
|---|---|---|
| 1. | "I'm Amazed" (radio edit) | 3:56 |

== Charts ==
| Chart (2008) | Peak position |
|---|---|
| US Adult Alternative Airplay (Billboard) | 5 |
