= The Waterfall II =

Studio album by My Morning Jacket
- Released: July 10, 2020
- Recorded: 2013–2014
- Studio: Flora Recording & Playback Portland, Oregon, United States; In Heaven Recording Studios; La La Land, Removador Fun Ranch Louisville, Kentucky, United States; Panoramic House, Stinson Beach, California, United States
- Genre: Indie rock; jam band; psychedelic pop
- Length: 46:35
- Label: ATO
- Producer: Jim James; Tucker Martine

My Morning Jacket chronology
The Waterfall (2015)	The Waterfall II (2020)	My Morning Jacket (2021)

The Waterfall II is the eighth studio album by American rock band My Morning Jacket, released on July 10, 2020. Made up of recordings made in 2013 that also produced the 2015 release The Waterfall, this psychedelic pop work has received positive reviews from critics.

== Recording and release ==
The album is made up of outtake recordings from the band's 2015 release The Waterfall, which vocalist Jim James reviewed during the COVID-19 pandemic. At the time, James mentioned that My Morning Jacket had enough material for a second album but the material was unrelated to The Waterfall; he indicated that they would release the next album swiftly but they only put out occasional singles until 2020. James rediscovered the songs after listening to his own personal digital music player on shuffle when the track "Spinning My Wheels" came on. The band debuted the release via an online listening party on July 9, 2020; the digital edition was released the next day with physical editions slated for release on August 28. "Magic Bullet" was previously released as a single on July 11, 2016. "The First Time", which was featured on the Roadies soundtrack, was released as a single on July 15, 2016. "Welcome Home" has previously been performed live by the band and was recorded as part of their 2011 iTunes Session EP.

== Critical reception ==
Professional ratings
Aggregate scores
Source	Rating
AnyDecentMusic?	7.1/10
Metacritic	77/100
Review scores
Source	Rating
AllMusic	3.5/5 stars
American Songwriter	4/5 stars
Classic Rock	7/10
Consequence of Sound	B+
Exclaim!	7/10
Mojo	4/5 stars
Pitchfork	7.2/10
Q	4/5 stars
Rolling Stone	3.5/5 stars
Under the Radar	8/10

According to the review aggregator Metacritic, The Waterfall II received "generally favorable reviews" based on a weighted average score of 77 out of 100 from 14 critic scores. The critical consensus at Album of the Year is a 74 out of 100 with 17 reviews.

The weekend of The Waterfall II's release, several brief, positive reviews were posted online by outlets such as The Oakland Press, calling it noteworthy; a recommendation by The Kokomo Tribune; Pitchfork, with reviewer Madison Bloom naming it one of six albums to listen to of the week; and Billboard declaring it "the album that will sound great at music festivals in 2021 (and beyond)". Brooklyn Vegan's notable releases of the week included The Waterfall II for its diverse blending of genres, the strength of James' vocals, and the band's willingness to experiment after over 20 years of performing and recording. Uproxx's Zac Gelfand named this one of the best new indie music releases of the week; that publication also featured a full review by Steven Hyden that considers this superior to the original Waterfall.

The editorial staff of AllMusic gave this album 3.5 out of five stars, with reviewer Mark Deming considering this superior to The Waterfall, summing up his review by writing that this is, "consistent, well-structured, and satisfying in a way the original was not". Tyler Clark of Consequence of Sound praised the musicianship of the album but criticized the relative lack of experimentation from the first volume; he recommends it particularly as summer escapism during the difficulties of quarantine in the COVID-19 pandemic. In American Songwriter, Hal Horowitz gave the release four out of five stars, noting continuity in the mood of this album and its predecessor, with attention given to the interplay of James' introspective lyrics with the upbeat music that accompanies it; he ends his review stating, "the set may not be quite as impressive or cohesive as its Grammy nominated predecessor, but it’s not far behind it". In Our Culture Mag, Konstantinos Pappis gave the album three out of five stars, finding the album "unexpectedly prescient", with strong lyrics and "much-needed escapism" that suffers from "more of the same" that "fails to replicate [My Morning Jacket]'s most transcendent moments".

Stephen M. Deusner of Pitchfork gave the release a 7.2 out of 10, echoing other reviewers' perspective that the timing of the release is relevant and he highlights James' vocals and the quality of his lyrics. Mark Richardson of The Wall Street Journal considers this a "mostly serene and reflective record" that focuses on "longing, memory, and spiritual healing" that speaks to James' strengths as a vocalist and considers this album "a remarkably cohesive set that never feels like a collection of leftovers, an album just as good as its predecessor that complements its tone". Calum Slingerland of Exclaim! gave the album a seven out of 10, ending, "Much of this material would be hard pressed to directly sweep anything off The Waterfall in its wake, but... The Waterfall II is enjoyable closure to those who will soon turn to anticipate the next new album My Morning Jacket have on deck". Jim Scott of Under the Radar gave the album eight out of 10 stars, with special attention to the vocals and how this album fits into the band's musical evolution. Rolling Stone included this release as one of the 18 picks for the month of September 2020.

== Track listing ==
1. "Spinning My Wheels" – 4:48
2. "Still Thinkin’" – 4:14
3. "Climbing the Ladder" – 3:00
4. "Feel You" – 6:14
5. "Beautiful Love (Wasn’t Enough)" – 2:52
6. "Magic Bullet" – 5:12
7. "Run It" – 4:37
8. "Wasted" – 6:06
9. "Welcome Home" – 3:46
10. "The First Time" – 5:46

== Personnel ==
My Morning Jacket

- Tom Blankenship – bass guitar
- Carl Broemel – guitar, backing vocals
- Patrick Hallahan – drums
- Jim James – guitar, lead vocals, artwork, production
- Bo Koster – keyboards, backing vocals

Additional musicians

- Anna Fritz – strings, backing vocals
- Brittany Howard – backing vocals
- Kacey Johansing – backing vocals
- Kyleen King – strings, backing vocals
- Patti King – strings, backing vocals

Technical personnel

- Danny Cash – layout
- Danny Clinch – photography
- Michael Finn – engineering
- Neil Krug – artwork
- Emily Lazar – mastering at The Lodge Recording Studio
- Tucker Martine – recording, production, mixing engineer, recording
- Kevin Ratterman – engineering

== Charts ==
Chart performance for The Waterfall II
Chart (2020)	Peak position
Belgian Albums (Ultratop Flanders)	134
US Billboard 200	117

== See also ==
- List of 2020 albums
