= Beautify Earth =

Non-profit organization

Beautify Earth is an American non-profit visual arts organization that creates murals in neglected neighborhoods. It is a collective of artists who want to end urban blight with street art, colorful murals on buildings.

== History ==
Our eyes love color, and if I can get your attention I can take you out of this fear-based mentality and show you there’s still love and beauty in this world.

— Ruben Rojas

Original funding was provided by Evan Meyer, who became president of the organization co-founded by Ruben Rojas and Paul Shustak in 2013. It was established "to clean up Lincoln Boulevard, a commercial street in Santa Monica referred to at the time as 'stinkin' Lincoln' ". Its mission has become, "to link up loving artists with unloved spaces to turn them into something everyone can love".

Public radio station KCRW in Los Angeles reported in 2017, "Operating now in multiple cities and countries, the nonprofit brings together business owners, landlords, nonprofit foundations and artists with the goal of painting over blank walls with 'positive,' colorful and inspiring murals."

The New York Times wrote of Beautify Earth's sister company, Beautify's "Back to the Streets" campaign, "Its creators are aiming for 1,000 murals by 1,000 artists in 100 cities to be painted as neighborhoods begin to open up in the coming weeks and months." A project in the Rockaways, New York, included collaboration with high school students, with the intent to encourage people to "travel to see the murals, give the local economy a boost, and remember the beautiful beaches they enjoyed in the years before Sandy swept through".

During the COVID-19 pandemic, in Santa Monica, Beautify (the for-profit offshoot of Beautify Earth) "painted colorful murals across town bearing reminders that people can continue caring for others even while physically distancing themselves."

By 2020, according to Los Angeles Magazine, the project started on Lincoln Ave in Los Angeles has resulted in "works being painted on walls across the globe."

== Awards ==
In July 2017 California Travel Association honored Beuatify Earth with its Cultural Tourism Champion Award.
