= My Morning Jacket (album) =

Studio album by My Morning Jacket
- Released: October 22, 2021
- Studios: 64 Sound, Los Angeles
- Genres: Psychedelic rock; roots rock
- Length: 60:33
- Label: ATO
- Producer: Jim James

My Morning Jacket chronology
| The Waterfall II (2020) | My Morning Jacket (2021) | Is (2025) |

Singles from My Morning Jacket
- 1. "Regularly Scheduled Programming" Released: August 24, 2021; 2. "Love Love Love" Released: September 14, 2021

Professional ratings
Aggregate scores
| Source | Rating |
|---|---|
| Metacritic | 80/100 |
Review scores
| Source | Rating |
| AllMusic | 4/5 stars |
| The Line of Best Fit | 8/10 |
| Pitchfork | 5.0/10 |
| PopMatters | 7/10 |

My Morning Jacket is the ninth studio album by American rock band My Morning Jacket, released on October 22, 2021, through ATO Records. The album was preceded by the release of the single "Regularly Scheduled Programming".

== Recording ==
The album was recorded at 64 Sound in Los Angeles, with Jim James as producer and engineer.

== Critical reception ==
On review aggregator Metacritic, the album has a score of 80 out of 100 based on five critics' reviews, indicating "generally favorable" reception. Janne Oinonen of The Line of Best Fit found the album to be a "supremely engaging, often blissfully beautiful halfway point between the glossy eccentricities of more recent MMJ albums and those old slow-burn yet highly combustible 'jam band' dynamics".

== Track listing ==
All tracks are written by Jim James.

My Morning Jacket track listing
| No. | Title | Length |
|---|---|---|
| 1. | "Regularly Scheduled Programming" | 3:44 |
| 2. | "Love Love Love" | 3:42 |
| 3. | "In Color" | 7:20 |
| 4. | "Least Expected" | 4:39 |
| 5. | "Never in the Real World" | 5:48 |
| 6. | "The Devil's in the Details" | 9:09 |
| 7. | "Lucky to Be Alive" | 4:24 |
| 8. | "Complex" | 4:18 |
| 9. | "Out of Range, Pt. 2" | 4:26 |
| 10. | "Penny for Your Thoughts" | 4:47 |
| 11. | "I Never Could Get Enough" | 8:16 |
| Total length: | | 60:33 |

== Charts ==
Chart performance for My Morning Jacket
| Chart (2021) | Peak position |
|---|---|
| Scottish Albums (Official Charts) | 66 |
| UK Independent Albums (Official Charts) | 19 |
| US Billboard 200 | 49 |
| US Independent Albums (Billboard) | 7 |
| US Top Rock Albums (Billboard) | 8 |
