= It Still Moves =

Studio album by My Morning Jacket
- Released: September 9, 2003
- Recorded: Above the Cadillac, Shelbyville, Kentucky
- Genres: Indie rock; Southern rock; jam band; alternative country
- Length: 71:43
- Label: ATO
- Producer: Jim James

My Morning Jacket chronology
Chocolate and Ice (2002)	It Still Moves (2003)	Acoustic Citsuoca (2004)

Singles from It Still Moves
- 1. "Run Thru" Released: 2003; 2. "Mahgeetah" Released: 2003; 3. "One Big Holiday" Released: 2004; 4. "Golden" Released: March 2004

2016 reissue artwork

It Still Moves is the third studio album by the rock band My Morning Jacket. The album garnered positive reviews and is often considered the band's best work alongside Z. The song "Run Thru" is included in Rolling Stone's "100 Greatest Guitar Songs". The album also marks the first appearance of drummer Patrick Hallahan, as well as the final appearances of guitarist Johnny Quaid and keyboardist Danny Cash.

The album was remixed and reissued by ATO Records in May 2016.

== Album art ==
The album cover and art work for It Still Moves shows one of the giant stuffed bears that are always displayed on stage when the band performs live. Drummer Patrick Hallahan told Rolling Stone that "[the bears are] our spirit animal guides. They make sure we're going in the right direction."

== Reception ==
Professional ratings
Aggregate scores
Source	Rating
Metacritic	83/100
Review scores
Source	Rating
AllMusic	4/5 stars
Blender	4/5 stars
Entertainment Weekly	B−
Mojo	4/5 stars
Pitchfork	8.3/10
Q	4/5 stars
Rolling Stone	3/5 stars
Spin	A−
Uncut	5/5 stars
The Village Voice	C

- AllMusic: "My Morning Jacket may be a journey through the past, but it's also a solid step into something rock & roll has been missing...melody, extremely catchy and well-written songs... and a love of the great pop continuum that translates into something new."
- Pitchfork Media:"It Still Moves...[is] an album by turns beautiful and possessed, by others raucous and fiery. My Morning Jacket have made the move to the bigs in tremendous style...[the album's length, its one major flaw] is a small concern considering the riches that await inside."
- Spin: "This time, the band lug the still-smoking amps from their lightning-strike live show into the studio and let the noise chase the midnite vultures away."
- The Village Voice: "...and I guess his (Jim James's) boys are trickier than Crazy Horse, just not in any way you haven't heard before. Then there's his filtered drawl, his straitened tune sense, his lyrics you feel cheated straining for, his 12 songs in 72 minutes."

The album currently has a score of 83 at critic aggregator site Metacritic.

The album has sold 265,000 copies in the United States as of April 2016.

== Track listing ==
All tracks are written by Jim James.

No.	Title	Length
1.	"Mahgeetah"	5:56
2.	"Dancefloors"	5:38
3.	"Golden"	4:39
4.	"Masterplan"	5:05
5.	"One Big Holiday"	5:21
6.	"I Will Sing You Songs"	9:18
7.	"Easy Morning Rebel"	5:09
8.	"Run Thru"	5:45
9.	"Rollin Back"	7:50
10.	"Just One Thing"	3:13
11.	"Steam Engine"	7:26
12.	"One in the Same"	6:23
Total length:		71:43

== Personnel ==
- Jim James – vocals, guitars, artwork
- Johnny Quaid – guitars, vocals, artwork
- Tom Blankenship – bass
- Patrick Hallahan – drums
- Danny Cash – keyboards, artwork, graphic design, layout design
- Niko Bolas – studio construction
- Bill Burrs – A&R
- Greg Calbi – mastering
- Sam Erickson – photography, cover art
- Jim James – producer
- Danny Kadar – engineer, mixing
- Michael MacDonald – A&R
- Archie Mitchell – engineer
- Kathy Olliges – artwork
- Linda Park – artwork
- Jojo Pennebaker – photography, cover art
- Steve Ralbovsky – A&R
- Lester Snell – horn arrangements

== Charts ==
=== Album ===
Year	Chart	Position
2003	Billboard 200	121
2004	Billboard Top Heatseekers	2
