= At Dawn =

Studio album by My Morning Jacket
- Released: April 6, 2001
- Studio: Above the Cadillac (Shelbyville, Kentucky)
- Genre: Indie rock; psychedelic rock; Southern rock; alternative country
- Length: 73:54
- Label: Darla
- Producer: Jim James

My Morning Jacket chronology
The Tennessee Fire (1999)	At Dawn (2001)	Chocolate and Ice (2002)

At Dawn is the second studio album by American rock band My Morning Jacket. Produced by group frontman Jim James, the album was released on April 6, 2001, by Darla Records. The Kentucky-based group had begun several years prior when James needed an outlet for folky, acoustic songs. Its first album for independent label Darla, 1999's The Tennessee Fire, attracted a devoted following in the Netherlands, prompting the young band to tour heavily.

At Dawn is a turning point for the band in its steps toward more ambitious song lengths and eclecticism in other genres. Like its predecessor, the group recorded the album at James' extended family's soybean farm in rural Kentucky. He recorded his vocals in an abandoned grain silo to take advantage of its natural reverb.

== Background ==
My Morning Jacket was started by singer-songwriter Jim James in Louisville, Kentucky in 1998. James created the project as an acoustic outlet for songs he felt were unsuitable for his main band, Month of Sundays. He recruited his cousin Johnny Quaid on guitar, Tom Blankenship on bass, and J. Glenn on drums, and the quartet signed to independent label Darla Records. Their debut album, The Tennessee Fire (1999), attracted a devoted following in the Netherlands, prompting the band to secure management and tour heavily.

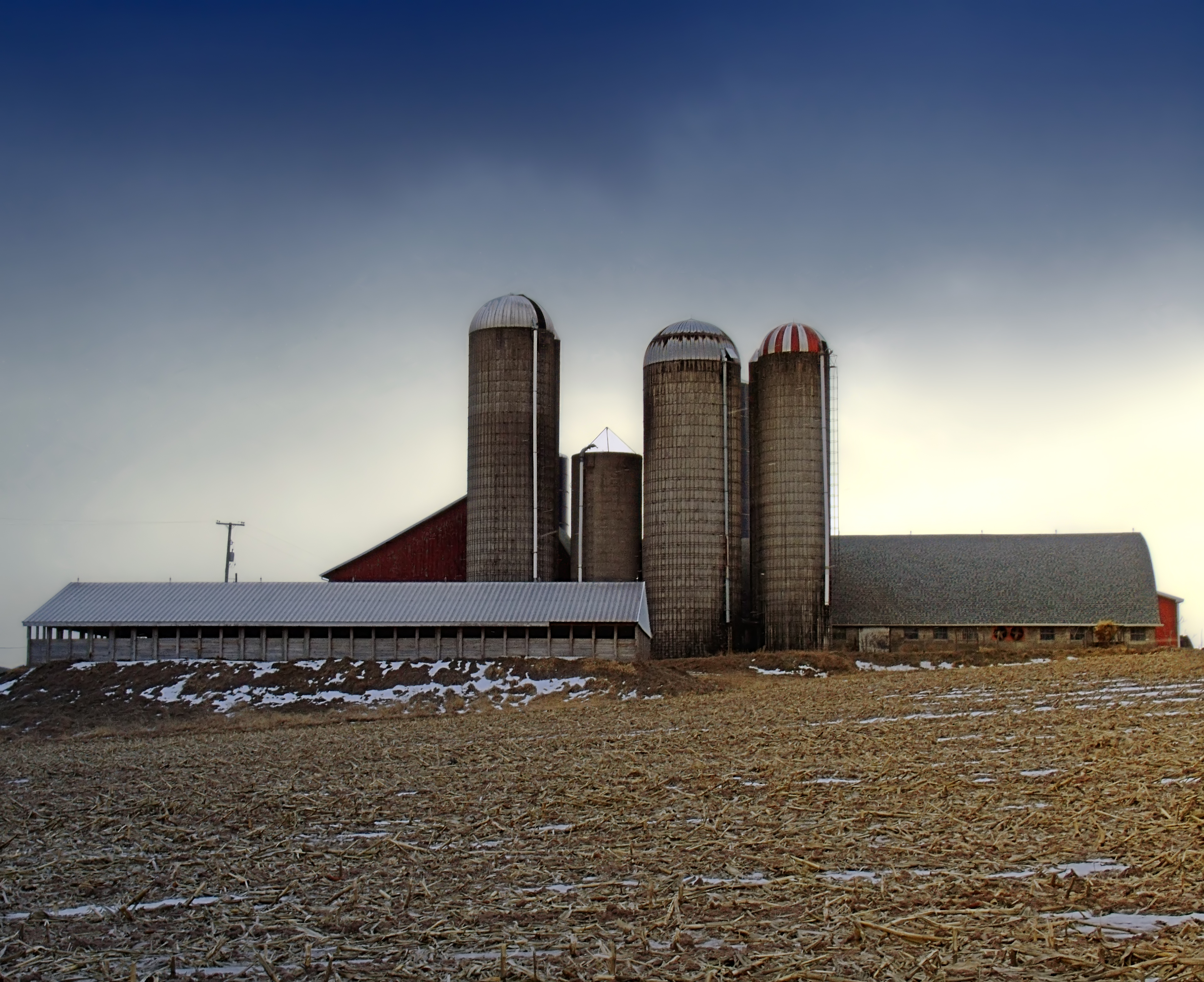
Frontman Jim James recorded his vocals in an unused grain silo.

Like its predecessor, At Dawn was recorded at Quaid's rural family farm in Shelbyville, Kentucky, a city outside Louisville. The group converted an apartment above a three-car garage at the property into a home studio, which they called Above the Cadillac. James recorded his vocals in an abandoned grain silo, utilizing its natural reverb. He professed a love for atmospheric, "huge open sounds, such as vocals cut far away from the mic in a big room," specifically pointing to the Rolling Stones' Exile on Main Street, or John Bonham's drum work on Led Zeppelin albums. James noted the group committed themselves to recording: "we locked ourselves in for many days with all the necessary elements–lights, candles, Madonna’s Immaculate Collection, Dreamcast and cookies." Years later, he looked back fondly at the process, highlighting his youth and inexperience: "We were just so green and just such infants, we didn't really know anything about professional recording or anything like that, but we recorded it all ourselves and recorded it all to tape and just had a really amazing time out there," he said. It was the first time the quartet made an album with the foresight that, due to their burgeoning overseas fanbase, people would be listening. After recording, James co-mixed the album with David Trumfio at Kingsize Sound Labs.

At Dawn has been described as a "loose, sprawling collection of folk-rock songs that hearken back to the glory days of classic rock." The Chicago Tribune's John Cook characterized that the use of reverb "lends it the character of a distant transmission, a dispatch from a different time." James clarified the band's mission in a 2001 interview: "We’re just trying to bring rock ’n’ roll back to the table, plain and simple [...] pure rock ’n’ roll with a heart that beats for the common man." James wrote "The Way That He Sings" about his favorite vocalists, specifically Roy Orbison and Neil Young, and their intonation and voice.

In 2023 James revealed that the cover photo is of the Hollywood Bowl.

== Release ==
Professional ratings
Review scores
Source	Rating
AllMusic	4.5/5 stars
Mojo	4/5 stars
Pitchfork	7.1/10
Stylus Magazine	A−
Uncut	4/5 stars

At Dawn was first issued on compact disc in Belgium and the Netherlands on March 30, 2001, through Darla Records. The label made it available for mail order on April 5 in the U.S. and elsewhere, with a general retail release occurring on April 17. The first 2500 copies on CD included a bonus disc of demos that James recorded in his bedroom, which was also included with the album's original vinyl release, which followed on April 28, 2001. Darla made "The Way That He Sings" available on its website as a preview for the upcoming album.

The album bolstered the band's fanbase in their home country, earning praise from Foo Fighters frontman Dave Grohl, with whom the group later toured, as well as English band Doves.

== Track listing ==
All tracks are written by Jim James.

No.	Title	Length
1.	"At Dawn"	3:49
2.	"Lowdown"	3:53
3.	"The Way That He Sings"	5:35
4.	"Death Is My Sleezy Pay"	5:28
5.	"Hopefully"	5:55
6.	"Bermuda Highway"	3:19
7.	"Honest Man"	7:46
8.	"X-mas Curtain"	4:49
9.	"Just Because I Do"	2:55
10.	"If It Smashes Down"	5:28
11.	"I Needed It Most"	6:36
12.	"Phone Went West"	7:05
13.	"Strangulation!"	8:08
14.	"Untitled Bonus Song" (Hidden track)	3:08
Total length:		73:54

Bonus CD: At Dawn Demos
No.	Title	Length
1.	"Way That He Sings"	5:03
2.	"Hopefully"	3:48
3.	"Just Because I Do"	2:59
4.	"Bermuda Highway"	2:53
5.	"Lowdown"	4:19
6.	"Honest Man"	4:07
7.	"At Dawn"	1:54
8.	"I Needed It Most"	4:26
9.	"Lead Me Father"	3:13
10.	"Phone Went West"	3:50
11.	"Chills"	7:28
Total length:		44:00

20th Anniversary Edition
No.	Title	Length
1.	"Bermuda Hwy (Live on KVRX)"	3:36
2.	"Lowdown (Live on KVRX)"	4:37
3.	"Hopefully (Live on KVRX)"	4:57
4.	"Nashville to Kentucky (Live on KVRX)"	5:08
5.	"I Needed It Most (Live on KVRX)"	6:02
6.	"I Will Be There When You Die (Live on KVRX)"	7:50
7.	"Just Because I Do (Live on KVRX)"	4:55
Total length:		37:07

- Track 4 is listed as "Death Is the Easy Way" in the liner notes.
- Track 12 is listed as "Phone Went Dead" in the liner notes.
- Track 14 is not shown in the album's track listing, but is credited as such in the "For the Record" section of the liner notes. It is often listed as "Hidden Song #1", "Untitled Bonus Track", "Mediate, Try Not to Hate... Love Yer Mate, Like Sex on 8...", or "Bonus Track".

== Personnel ==
- Jim James – vocals, guitars, harmonica, banjo
- Johnny Quaid – guitar
- Two Tone Tommy – bass guitar
- Chris "KC" Guetig – drums
- Keenan Lawler– Resonator guitar
- Danny Cash – keyboards
