= Evil Urges =

Studio album by My Morning Jacket
- Released: June 10, 2008
- Recorded: Avatar Studios, New York City November 2007
- Genres: Indie rock; neo-psychedelia
- Length: 55:39
- Labels: ATO (US/Canada); Rough Trade (UK); Spunk (Australia)
- Producers: Joe Chiccarelli; Jim James

My Morning Jacket chronology
Z (2005)	Evil Urges (2008)	Circuital (2011)

Singles from Evil Urges
- 1. "Touch Me I'm Going to Scream Pt. 2" Released: 2008; 2. "I'm Amazed" Released: 2008

Evil Urges is the fifth studio album by My Morning Jacket. It was released by ATO Records on June 10, 2008. The album was nominated for the 2008 Grammy Award for Best Alternative Music Album, ultimately losing to Radiohead's In Rainbows.

== Writing and recording ==
Writing began in Colorado, while recording was done in Manhattan. According to producer Joe Chiccarelli, the demos he was sent, which were "very groove-oriented with hints of old-fashioned R&B", suggested a more urban record than previous albums, and as such he recommended the band record in an urban environment that had some "life and vitality". After looking into various options including Vancouver and San Francisco, the band eventually decided to record in New York.

Singer and lead songwriter Jim James said that the band wanted to get away from "normal rock and roll sounds" and emulate more of the band's live sound. Many of the songs were previewed at the 2008 South by Southwest music festival.

== Promotion ==
My Morning Jacket played "I'm Amazed" and "Evil Urges" on Saturday Night Live on May 10, 2008. At the Bonnaroo Music Festival in June 2008, the band played a near four hour set, playing all songs on the album except "Look at You" and "Remnants".

The season six premiere of The CW's teen drama One Tree Hill was titled "Touch Me I'm Going to Scream" and featured the songs "Highly Suspicious" and "Look at You."

On November 22, 2009, the American Dad! episode "My Morning Straitjacket" featured the band members playing themselves. The episode utilised four songs from Evil Urges: "Touch Me I'm Going to Scream Part 2", "I'm Amazed", "Highly Suspicious" and "Remnants."

== Critical reception ==
Professional ratings
Aggregate scores
Source	Rating
Metacritic	67/100
Review scores
Source	Rating
AllMusic	4/5 stars
The A.V. Club	B
Entertainment Weekly	A
The Guardian	3/5 stars
Mojo	3/5 stars
Pitchfork	4.7/10
Q	3/5 stars
Rolling Stone	4/5 stars
Spin	4.5/5 stars
Uncut	3/5 stars

Evil Urges received mostly positive reviews from contemporary music critics. At Metacritic, which assigns a normalized rating out of 100 to reviews from mainstream critics, the album received an average score of 67, based on 31 reviews, which indicates "generally favorable reviews".

=== Accolades ===
Publication	Country	Accolade	Year	Rank
Rolling Stone	US	50 Best Albums of the Year	2008	No. 4
Spin	US	40 Best Albums of the Year	2008	No. 16
Paste	US	50 Best Albums of the Year	2008	No. 16
Blender	US	33 Best Albums of the Year	2008	No. 12
WXPN Philadelphia	US	50 Best Albums of the Year	2008	No. 4
WERS Boston	US	50 Best Albums of the Year	2008	No. 10
Q	UK	50 Best Albums of the Year	2008	No. 4

== Track listing ==
All tracks are written by Jim James, except where noted.

No.	Title	Writer(s)	Length
1.	"Evil Urges"	Breakdown: My Morning Jacket	5:14
2.	"Touch Me I'm Going to Scream Pt. 1"		3:51
3.	"Highly Suspicious"		3:07
4.	"I'm Amazed"		4:35
5.	"Thank You Too!"		4:29
6.	"Sec Walkin"		3:37
7.	"Two Halves"		2:36
8.	"Librarian"		4:18
9.	"Look at You"		3:30
10.	"Aluminum Park"		3:58
11.	"Remnants"		3:04
12.	"Smokin from Shootin"		5:07
13.	"Touch Me I'm Going to Scream Pt. 2"		8:14
14.	"Good Intentions"		0:06
Total length:			55:39

== Personnel ==
My Morning Jacket

- Jim James – vocals, guitars, bass, drums, percussion, Omnichord
- Tom "Two Tone Tommy" Blankenship – bass
- Patrick Hallahan – drums, percussion
- Carl Broemel – guitars, vocals, pedal steel, lap steel
- Bo Koster – keyboards, programming, vocals, piano, synthesizers, organ, Rhodes, percussion

Additional personnel

- Jim James, Joe Chiccarelli – production
- Michael Brauer – mixing
- Bob Ludwig – mastering
- Artie Smith – drum tech
- David Campbell – string arrangements
- Rick Kwan – vocal on "Good Intentions"

Assistance

- Rick Kwan, Colin Suzuki, Will Hensley, Kyle Mc Innis, Lowell Reynolds, Andy Taub

== Charts ==
Chart performance for Evil Urges
Chart (2008)	Peak position
Australian Albums (ARIA)	56
Belgian Albums (Ultratop Flanders)	34
Dutch Albums (Album Top 100)	80
Swedish Albums (Sverigetopplistan)	55
US Billboard 200	9
