= Z (My Morning Jacket album) =

Studio album by My Morning Jacket
- Released: October 4, 2005
- Studios: Allaire Studios, Shokan, New York, United States
- Genres: Alternative country; indie pop; indie rock; soul; space rock
- Length: 47:00
- Label: ATO
- Producers: John Leckie; Jim James

My Morning Jacket chronology
Acoustic Citsuoca (2004)	Z (2005)	Evil Urges (2008)

Singles from Z
- 1. "Off the Record" Released: October 10, 2005; 2. "Gideon" Released: 2006

Z is the fourth studio album by psychedelic rock band My Morning Jacket. This collection features a much spacier and more polished sound than previous releases, making heavy use of synthesizers throughout and incorporating reggae and dub influences. The heavy reverb that was a defining characteristic of the band's prior recordings is largely absent. The songs on the album are more focused and shorter compared to the band's previous albums.

A double-live album, Okonokos, was recorded at the end of the Z Tour and was released on September 26, 2006; it features live versions of eight of Z's 10 songs.

In 2012, Rolling Stone ranked the album at number 457 on its list of The 500 Greatest Albums of All Time. The magazine has also ranked the album 31st on its list of the 100 best albums of the 2000s and 23rd of the 40 greatest stoner albums ever.

== Background and production ==
In September 2003, My Morning Jacket released its third album It Still Moves. It was the band's first album to be released by ATO Records. It Still Moves was well received by critics and peaked at number two on the Heatseekers Albums in the United States. During the subsequent tour, guitarist Johnny Quaid and keyboardist Danny Cash quit the band on amicable terms, and were replaced by guitarist Carl Broemel and keyboardist Bo Koster. Drummer Patrick Hallahan said that while the arrival of new members put the band in an awkward position, it was also a liberating experience. "We thought, 'Let's take ourselves out of our element.'"

For the next My Morning Jacket album, the band members wanted to experiment with unique arrangements and a greater usage of musical soundscapes when compared to their previous albums. Vocalist Jim James said the band went out of their comfort zone, and decided to record the album at the remote Allaire Studios in the Catskill Mountains instead of in their hometown of Louisville, Kentucky. According to bassist Tom Blankenship: "We had been talking for years about really locking ourselves in when we did an album, and now there was no excuse but to be in the studio all the time. You'd wake up and have breakfast and grab your coffee and walk into the control room."

Z was the first My Morning Jacket album to have a professional producer. James had previously produced every album, which he said was out of pride. Before the recording sessions began, James met producer John Leckie, who was known for his work with bands such as Pink Floyd and Radiohead. Leckie was also a tape operator on the George Harrison album All Things Must Pass, one of James' favorite albums. James said Leckie's perspective as an outsider played a pivotal role in the production of the album. According to James: "Sometimes when everybody in the band is just there, you know, people don't want to hurt anyone's feelings, or you might think that it was a good take because everyone is tired. We really learned the value of having another ear there."

== Composition ==
This album was seen by reviewers as a shift in the musical genre of the band and vocal style of James, in part due to working with John Leckie and the inclusion of genres such as reggae and dub on "Off the Record".

== Digital rights management ==
The CD was one of the more high-profile releases in 2005 featuring digital rights management technology to prohibit owners from playing the music on a computer or creating digital copies. United States pressings of this CD contain MediaMax CD-3 by SunnComm. The band's manager, Mike Martinovich, expressed their dissatisfaction with the technology and it was abandoned on subsequent releases. The band themselves provided information on their website about how to bypass the software, and also offered to burn individual copies of the album for fans, free of copy-protection software.

== Critical reception ==
Professional ratings
Aggregate scores
Source	Rating
Metacritic	90/100
Review scores
Source	Rating
AllMusic	4.5/5 stars
Entertainment Weekly	A−
The Guardian	3/5 stars
Los Angeles Times	3.5/4 stars
Mojo	5/5 stars
NME	9/10
Pitchfork	7.6/10
Q	4/5 stars
Rolling Stone	4/5 stars
Spin	A−

The album was the second highest rated album of 2005 according to Metacritic, behind Sufjan Stevens' Illinois; the album has a total score of 90 out of 100.

Technically, both Z and Illinois were tied for the highest Metacritic rating in 2005, with a score of 90 each. However, the score for Illinois was based on a larger overall number of reviews: 40, compared to 31 for Z.

Online music magazine Pitchfork Media placed Z at number 146 on their list of top 200 albums of the 2000s, calling it My Morning Jacket's OK Computer. In 2012, Rolling Stone ranked the album at number 457 on its list of The 500 Greatest Albums of All Time. The magazine has also ranked the album 31st on its list of the 100 best albums of the 2000s and 23rd of the 40 greatest stoner albums ever. In March 2022, the album ranked at number 1 on WFPK Louisville's "Top 500 Albums of the 2000's [sic] Countdown" which was conducted by a public poll.

== Track listing ==
All songs written by Jim James, except where noted:

1. "Wordless Chorus" – 4:12
2. "It Beats for You" – 3:46
3. "Gideon" – 3:39
4. "What a Wonderful Man" – 2:25
5. "Off the Record" (James, Tom Blankenship, Patrick Hallahan) – 5:33
6. "Into the Woods" – 5:21
7. "Anytime" – 3:56
8. "Lay Low" – 6:05
9. "Knot Comes Loose" – 4:02
10. "Dondante" – 8:01

The U.S. and Japanese pressing of the album contains the B-side "Chills"; digital copies include the other b-side "How Could I Know" (length 5:27) as well.

== Personnel ==
My Morning Jacket

- Tom Blankenship – bass guitar
- Carl Broemel – guitar, saxophone on "Dondante"
- Patrick Hallahan – drums
- Jim James – vocals, lead and rhythm guitars, and production
- Bo Koster – keyboards

Additional musicians and technical personnel

- Andrew Bird – strings, and whistles on "Gideon", "Into the Woods", and "It Beats 4 U"
- John Leckie – production
- M. Ward – acoustic guitar and choirs on "Into the Woods"

Artwork

- Katie Beach
- Guy Burwel
- Nicolai Denchev
- Mike Fulkerson
- Brandon Jones
- Kathleen Lolley

== Release history ==
Release formats for Z
Region	Date	Label	Format	Catalog
Worldwide	October 4, 2005	Badman	LP	947
United States	October 4, 2005	ATO/RCA	Compact Disc	71067
Europe	October 4, 2005	BMG	Compact Disc	21448
United States	October 4, 2005	ATO	Compact Disc	21601
Japan	October 4, 2005	BMG	Compact Disc	21448
Japan	2006	BMG	Compact Disc	24078†
United States	2008	ATO	LP	8808821601
United States	August 21, 2020	ATO	2×LP, purple vinyl†	

†This edition includes the bonus track "Chills"
