= Carl Broemel =

American rock musician

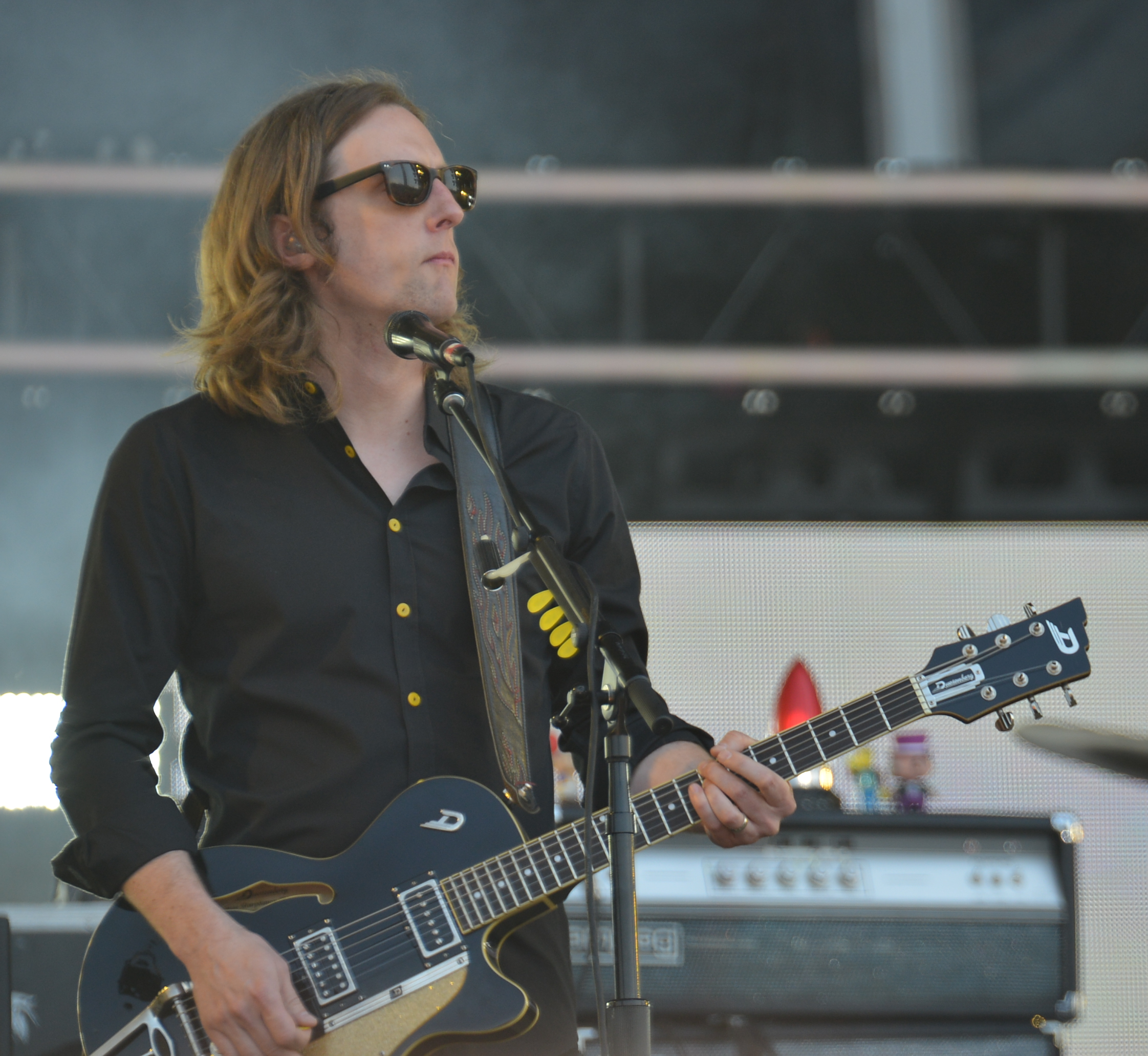
- Bromel performing in 2015

Background information
- Born: January 30, 1974 (age 52)
- Origin: Indianapolis, Indiana, US
- Genres: Psychedelic rock, indie rock
- Instruments: Guitar, pedal steel guitar, vocals, saxophone
- Labels: ATO Records, MapleMusic Recordings (Canada)
- Member of: My Morning Jacket
- Formerly of: Old Pike, Silvercrush, VHS or Beta
- Website: Official Website

Signature
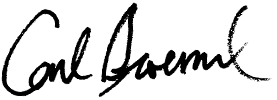

Carl Broemel (born January 30, 1974) is an American rock musician. He currently plays guitar, pedal steel guitar, saxophone and sings back-up vocals for the Louisville, Kentucky band My Morning Jacket. He played guitar in the pop/rock band Old Pike and the alternative pop/rock band Silvercrush.

== Early life, family and education ==
Broemel grew up on the north side of Indianapolis, Indiana, the son of a symphony musician. He attended and graduated from Pike High School.

== Career ==
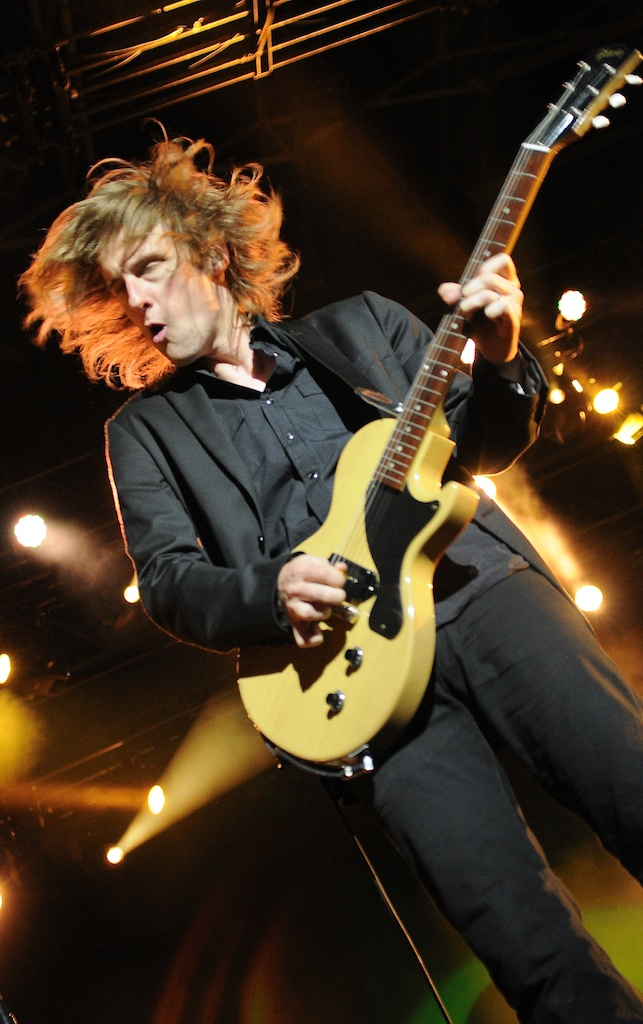
Broemel performing with My Morning Jacket in 2011

In 2007 Broemel was listed among Rolling Stone's 20 New Guitar Gods along with My Morning Jacket frontman Jim James. He has also released two solo albums. In 2010, he released his "Nashville" record All Birds Say. On October 11, 2010, Broemel played as a sit in guitarist with The Roots on Late Night with Jimmy Fallon. In December 2010 Broemel contributed to Wanda Jackson's album The Party Ain't Over.

In 2019, Broemel accompanied Ray LaMontagne during LaMontagne's Just Passing Through Tour. Broemel played guitar, pedal steel guitar, and sang back-up vocals on the November 9 and 10, 2019 tour dates in Denver, Colorado.

== Equipment ==
- Duesenberg Starplayer TV (black with gold pickguard)

== Discography ==
=== Solo albums ===
- Lose What's Left (2004)
- All Birds Say (2010)
- 4th of July (2016)
- Wished Out (2018)
- Brokenhearted Jubilee (2019) (EP, with Eric Hopper)

=== With My Morning Jacket ===
- Z (2005)
- Evil Urges (2008)
- Circuital (2011)
- The Waterfall (2015)
- The Waterfall II (2020)
- My Morning Jacket (2021)
- is (2025)
