= Circuital =

Studio album by My Morning Jacket
- Released: May 31, 2011
- Recorded: Louisville, Kentucky
- Genre: Psychedelic rock; indie rock; space rock
- Length: 45:07
- Language: English
- Label: ATO (US/Canada); Rough Trade (UK); Spunk/EMI (Australia)
- Producer: Jim James; Tucker Martine

My Morning Jacket chronology
Evil Urges (2008)	Circuital (2011)	The Waterfall (2015)

Singles from Circuital
- 1. "Holdin on to Black Metal" Released: March 4, 2011; 2. "The Day Is Coming" Released: May 31, 2011; 3. "Outta My System" Released: September 31, 2011

Circuital is the sixth studio album by American rock band My Morning Jacket. It was released on May 31, 2011.

The album received mainly positive reviews and sold 55,000 copies in the first week of release. It debuted at number 5 on the Billboard 200, improving on the band's previous highest debuting album Evil Urges, which entered the chart at number 9. This album peaked at 1 on the independent albums chart, 3 on the rock albums, and 3 on the alternative albums charts. The album has sold 208,000 copies in the US as of April 2015.

The album was also released as a double 12" 45 RPM vinyl set and as a deluxe vinyl edition. As promotion for the album, the band gave away one free download per week for six weeks until April 12. The first five tracks were recorded during their shows at New York's Terminal 5 in October 2010, while the final download was the new album's title track.

== Songs ==
All tracks were recorded in the band's hometown of Louisville, Kentucky in a church gymnasium with producer Tucker Martine. The album was mixed at Blackbird Studio in Nashville, Tennessee. Music site Antiquiet stated the main themes of Circuital deal with "growing older and wiser, but with a respect for past experiences." "Victory Dance" was brought on by Jim James' experience with Lasik surgery before the sessions for Circuital. The day after surgery, James began to play his Wurlitzer keyboard and reflected on the surgery. The lyrics, "Should I close my eyes and prophesize?" are taken from the surgery.

The title track was recorded on the band's second attempt. James explained to UK newspaper The Sun that the song is about the circular nature of life. Originally conceived as a Muppets song for Dr. Teeth and the Electric Mayhem, the song was to be performed by My Morning Jacket live with the Muppets on stage with the band behind a curtain, playing live. However, when the Muppets project was disbanded, the song was recorded for Circuital. "Outta My System" was also to be part of the failed Muppets tour. The song is about a man looking back on his reckless youth and, despite some risky life choices, the man is glad he did all those things and to be able to "get it outta my system." On the origins of "Holdin' On to Black Metal," bassist Tom Blankenship stated to IFC that it deals with holding on to something that you loved as a child that helped you cope with growing up. He went on to say: "How difficult would adolescence have been without the music that helped carry us through it? No one enters adulthood feeling none of the emotions they did when they were sixteen." The song contains an all female choir, consisting of friends of the band.

The songs "Wonderful" and "Outta My System" were originally written by Jim James for Dr. Teeth and the Electric Mayhem to perform in the 2011 film The Muppets and a subsequent tour, but these were left unused after the executive who hired him was fired. Of the turn of events James said: "So now, twice, Muppet glory has been within my grasp...it's pretty heartbreaking, but it did propel us just to kick into high gear and finish our own record."

== Album cover ==
The album cover is a close-up shot of a Magic eye tube fitted onto vintage radio receivers from the 1930s. The purpose of tuning eyes in these radio sets was to help tune a station in at its strongest point on the dial. So when the perfect frequency was found, the Magic Tuning Eye would be lit up all the way (like the album cover's). The percentage of light shown signified the strength of the signal. As mentioned to Rolling Stone by James, the album cover depicting the Magic eye tube was inspired by his own experience of getting Lasik eye surgery, saying: "The whole experience of it is so fucked up, it's somebody slicing your eyeball open and shooting you with a laser." It also inspired James to write the song "Victory Dance."

== Critical reception ==
Professional ratings
Aggregate scores
Source	Rating
AnyDecentMusic?	6.9/10
Metacritic	76/100
Review scores
Source	Rating
AllMusic	4/5 stars
The A.V. Club	B+
Entertainment Weekly	B+
The Guardian	4/5 stars
The Independent	4/5 stars
Los Angeles Times	3/4 stars
NME	7/10
Pitchfork	7.2/10
Rolling Stone	4/5 stars
Spin	8/10

Uncut placed the album at number 35 on its list of "Top 50 albums of 2011". It was also named the 9th best album by Clash, the third best by Paste and KCRW's music director and the 11th best by Rolling Stone. It also was named 14th best album of 2011 by American Songwriter, honorable mention by Glide, 78th best by PopMatters, and 20th best by Mojo.

On November 30, 2011, the album received a nomination in the 54th Grammy Awards for Best Alternative Music Album.

== Track listing ==
All tracks are written by Jim James.

No.	Title	Length
1.	"Victory Dance"	5:40
2.	"Circuital"	7:20
3.	"The Day Is Coming"	3:17
4.	"Wonderful (The Way I Feel)"	4:17
5.	"Outta My System"	3:22
6.	"Holdin on to Black Metal"	4:20
7.	"First Light"	3:46
8.	"You Wanna Freak Out"	3:20
9.	"Slow Slow Tune"	4:30
10.	"Movin' Away"	5:12
Total length:		45:07

Note: "Holdin' On to Black Metal" includes portions of "E-Saew Tam Punha Huajai (Advice Column for Love Troubles Part I)", written by Kwan Jai & Kwan Jit Sriprajan. James used the song as a loop to record the demo. The band subsequently used the loop as a guide when recording the final track.

On the LP version of Circuital, the intro to "The Day Is Coming" varies slightly and seems a couple seconds longer than the other released formats.

== Personnel ==
My Morning Jacket

- Tom Blankenship – bass guitar
- Carl Broemel – guitar, vocals, pedal steel, saxophone, horn arrangements
- Patrick Hallahan – drums, percussion
- Jim James – vocals, guitar, keyboards
- Bo Koster – keyboards, vocals, synthesizers, pianos, organs, glockenspiel, percussion

Additional musicians

- Black Metal Girls – group backing vocals (track 6)
- Chris Gregg – alto saxophone, baritone saxophone
- Jeremy Kittel – violin, viola
- Leif Shires – trumpet, flugelhorn
- Ben Sollee – cello
- Oscar Utterstrom – trombone, euphonium

== Charts ==
=== Weekly charts ===
Sales chart performance for Circuital
Chart (2011)	Peak position
Australian Albums (ARIA)	53
Australian Hitseekers Albums (ARIA)	2
Belgian Albums (Ultratop Flanders)	61
Belgian Heatseekers Albums (Ultratop Flanders)	17
Belgian Heatseekers Albums (Ultratop Wallonia)	6
Canadian Albums (Billboard)	15
Dutch Albums (MegaCharts)	91
Dutch Alternative Albums (MegaCharts)	6
Norwegian Albums (VG-lista)	22
Irish Albums (IRMA)	75
Swedish Albums (Sverigetopplistan)	12
Spanish Albums (Promusicae)	67
UK Albums (OCC)	60
US Billboard 200	5
US Independent Albums (Billboard)	1
US Top Rock Albums (Billboard)	3

=== Year-end charts ===
Year-end chart performance for Circuital
Chart (2011)	Position
US Top Rock Albums (Billboard)	48
