= My Morning Jacket =

American rock band

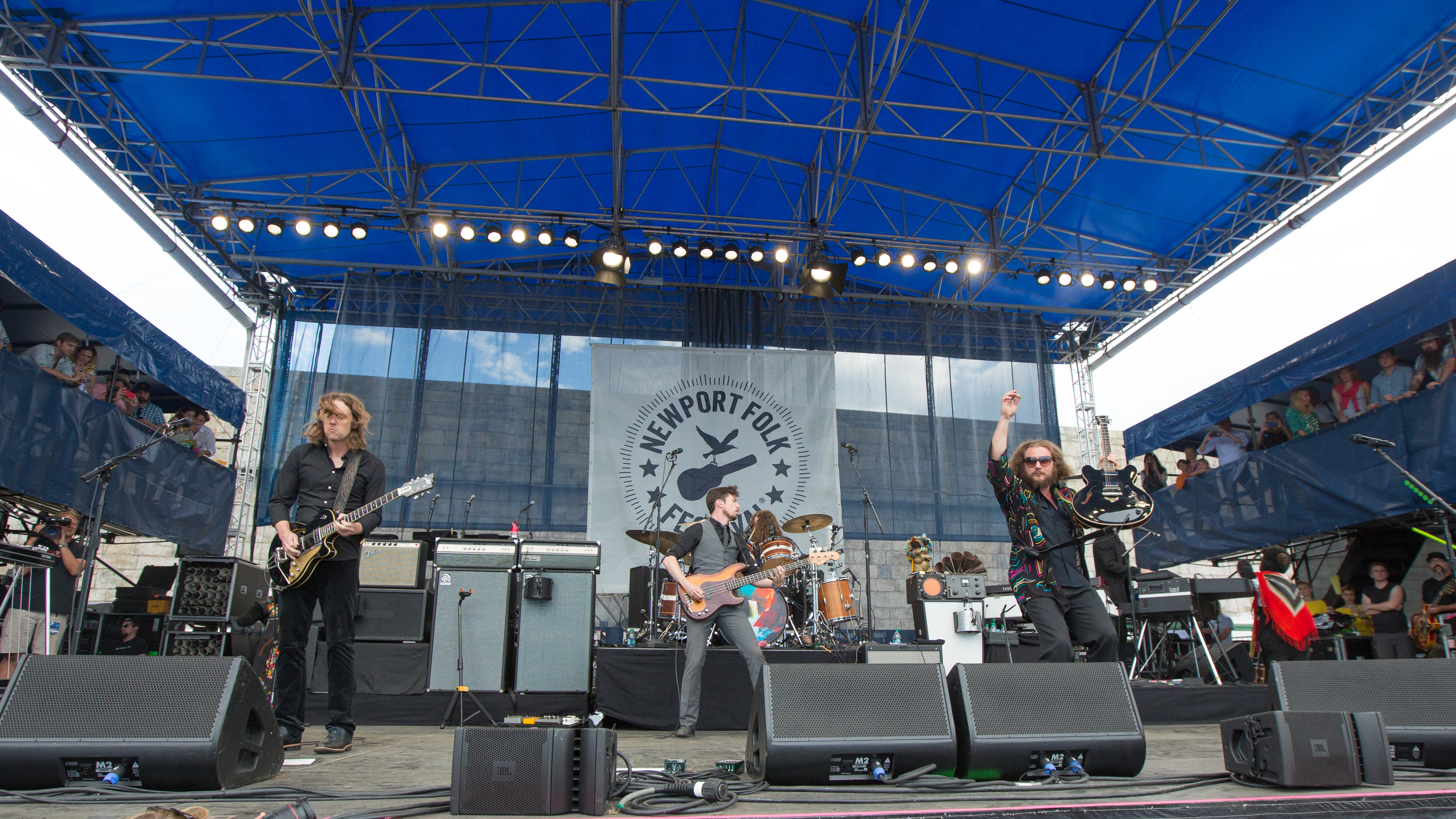
- Performing at Newport Folk Festival in 2015

Background information
- Origin: Louisville, Kentucky, U.S.
- Genres: Indie rock; art rock; psychedelic rock; alternative country; Southern rock; jam; Americana
- Years active: 1998–present
- Labels: Darla; Wichita; ATO; V2; Capitol; MapleMusic (Canada)
- Members: Jim James; Tom Blankenship; Patrick Hallahan; Bo Koster; Carl Broemel
- Past members: Johnny Quaid; Danny Cash; J. Glenn; Chris Guetig
- Website: mymorningjacket.com

My Morning Jacket is an American rock band formed in Louisville, Kentucky, in 1998. The band consists of vocalist/guitarist Jim James, bassist Tom Blankenship, drummer Patrick Hallahan, guitarist Carl Broemel, and keyboardist Bo Koster. The band's sound, rooted in rock and country, is often experimental and psychedelic. The group amassed a following beginning in the 2000s in part due to their live performances.

The group first found success in Europe after the release of its debut album, The Tennessee Fire (1999). Its next release, At Dawn (2001), led to a large stateside following and preceded several lineup changes. After signing to major label ATO Records, the group released two albums, It Still Moves (2003) and Z (2005), with the latter representing a critical breakthrough. The group's next release, Evil Urges (2008), was more polarizing for fans and critics, while Circuital (2011), its sixth album, saw a more measured response. The band's seventh album, The Waterfall, was released in 2015, followed by The Waterfall II in 2020, My Morning Jacket in 2021, and their tenth, titled Is, in 2025.

== History ==
=== Formation and debut releases (1998–2000) ===
My Morning Jacket was formed in Louisville, Kentucky in 1998 by singer-songwriter Jim James. James created the group as an outlet for acoustic songs he had developed on his own that his band at the time, Month of Sundays, could not use. The group's first lineup included his cousin, Johnny Quaid (guitar), Tom Blankenship (bass) and J. Glenn on drums, all formerly of Shelbyville-based emo-punk band Winter Death Club. The band's name stems from James, who once found a discarded coat with the emblazoned letters MMJ.

The band's debut album, The Tennessee Fire, was released in May 1999. It was mildly successful in the U.S., though it became a surprise hit internationally, particularly in the Netherlands and Belgium. Soon, the group launched a European tour, where it received high marks from Dutch and Belgian press; the group also appeared in the Dutch documentary This is NOT America. Danny Cash joined the band as keyboardist in 2000.

=== Early years and breakthrough (2001–2007) ===
The band's second effort, At Dawn (2001), helped grow the group's fanbase in its home country. For the album, James recorded his vocals in a grain silo, creating a sound heavy on echo that became a hallmark of the band's early releases. Subsequently, drummer J. Glenn left the band, and was briefly replaced by Chris Guetig. Patrick Hallahan, James' childhood best friend, replaced Guetig. In the early 2000s, the band toured heavily, often supporting bands such as Guided by Voices, Doves, and Foo Fighters. The group signed to independent label ATO Records in 2002 ahead of its third album, It Still Moves, which saw release in September 2003 to wide acclaim. In January 2004, Cash and Quaid announced their departure from the group; they were replaced by keyboardist Bo Koster and guitarist Carl Broemel. Cash and Quaid's departures left James and Blankenship as the two remaining original members.

Z, released in 2005, became the group's breakthrough album. It received positive critical reviews; in his review for Rolling Stone, critic David Fricke wrote, "America is a lot closer to getting its own Radiohead, and it isn't Wilco". The album was noticeable for a break from James' heavily reverbed vocals, and featured experimentation with dub, reggae and psychedelic rock. Okonokos, a live album captured while the band toured Z, was released in 2006.

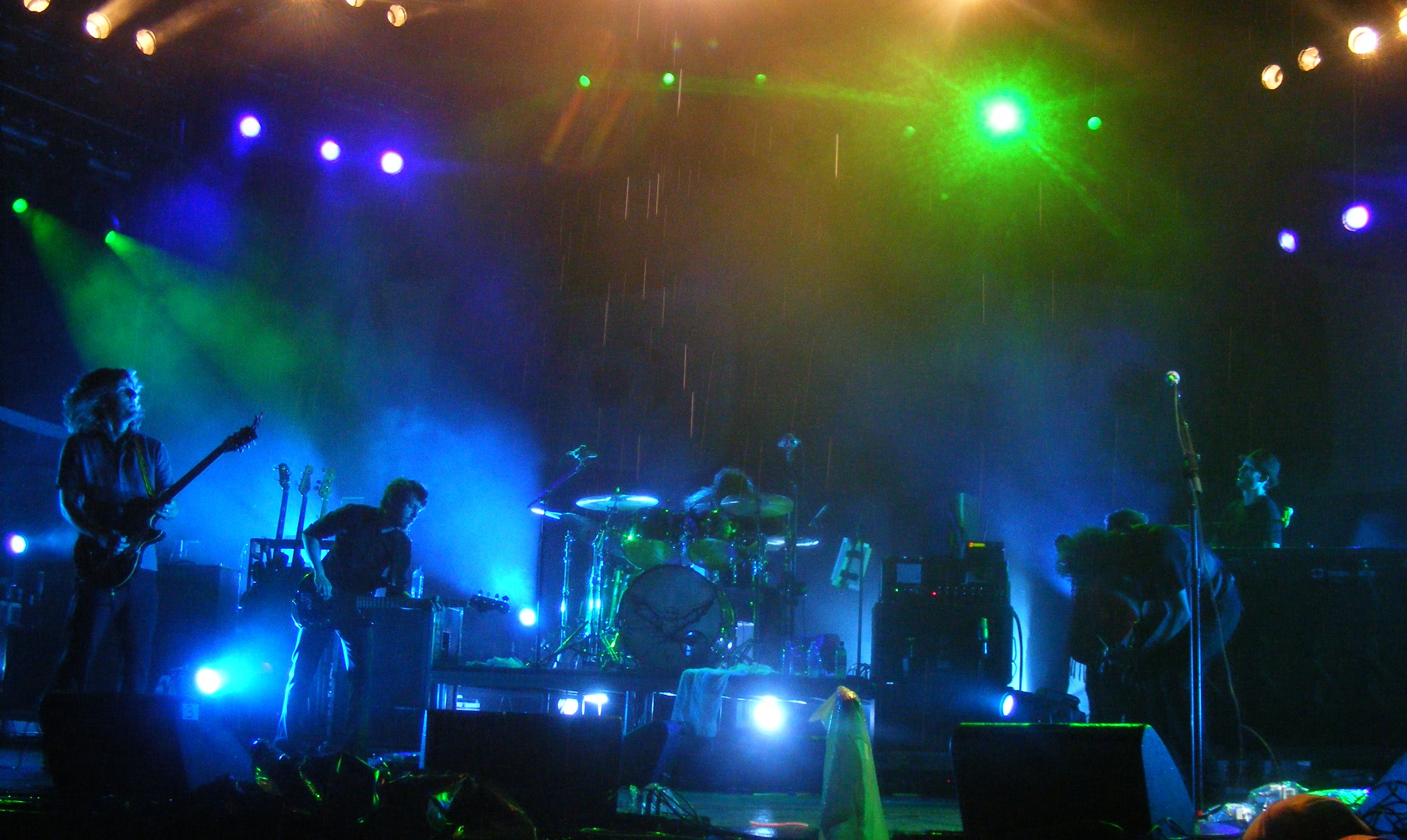
The band's four-hour late-night set in the rain at Bonnaroo 2008 has been regarded among their best performances.

=== Shift in sound (2008–2013) ===
The band's next release, Evil Urges, marked a considerable shift in their sound, and it received polarizing reactions from fans and critics. Many songs on the album developed on 90-minute walks James would embark on in Louisville. Its lyrics centered on a relationship that fell apart shortly before recording. To promote the album, the band appeared on Saturday Night Live. The band toured in support of the record that summer, which included a storied appearance at Bonnaroo Music Festival in Manchester, Tennessee. The band, beginning at midnight, performed for four hours in the rain. Unfazed by a torrential downpour for much of its first half, the band's set went on to feature thirty-five songs, including all but two tracks from Evil Urges and numerous covers, and featured a guest appearance from Kirk Hammett of Metallica. The set has commonly been regarded among the band's personal best and one of the best in the history of the festival. Rolling Stone called it "career-defining." Evil Urges was nominated for a Grammy for Best Alternative Rock Album. My Morning Jacket performed before a sold-out crowd at Madison Square Garden in New York.

The band members appeared as themselves in the American Dad! episode, "My Morning Straitjacket", which aired on November 22, 2009. The episode is based on American Dad! co-creator Mike Barker's "life-changing experience" at the band's 2008 Bonnaroo performance.

In 2010, My Morning Jacket took up residency at New York's Terminal 5 on October 18, 19, 21, 22 and 23, performing one of its five studio releases each night along with additional material from the relevant period. According to the September 16, 2010 issue of Rolling Stone, My Morning Jacket started working on its next LP. "We've got five songs done," says front man Jim James. "It'll probably be out next spring." James co-produced the record with The Decemberists collaborator Tucker Martine in an old church in My Morning Jacket's hometown of Louisville, Kentucky. "We're trying to do everything but the strings live," said James. "There's something old and dirty-sounding about it." The band's sixth album Circuital was released on May 31, 2011. The band toured for two years in support of Circuital. In 2013, it embarked on a tour alongside Wilco and Bob Dylan that left band members disappointed, as they had falsely been told Dylan desired to work with them.

=== Recent events (2014–present) ===
While the band took a break, James stayed busy, touring behind his solo album, Regions of Light and Sound of God, and collaborating with Elvis Costello and Marcus Mumford for the New Basement Tapes project. These individual side projects, rather than detach the musicians, worked to strengthen band members' skill as musicians, according to Blankenship. This led to a greater appreciation of the group upon their return to it. The band's next album, The Waterfall, was mainly recorded at a hilltop mansion above Stinson Beach in Marin County, California. The band felt the surroundings were "slightly supernatural," which produced a largely idyllic recording process. The Waterfall was released in May 2015, debuting number 11 on the Billboard 200 in the U.S., with 33,000 copies sold in its first week. In December 2015, The Waterfall was nominated for the Grammy Award for Best Alternative Music Album.

The sessions for The Waterfall were fruitful, producing over 24 completed songs, enough to fill two albums. MMJ took most of 2018 and the early part of 2019 off from touring, but regrouped for select shows in August 2019. James described the shows as among his favorite recent MMJ performances and says the group worked through some of their personal issues in advance of the shows. The members of My Morning Jacket admitted that they were not sure if they were ever going to reunite for a period of time during their extended break.

The Waterfall II was released on July 10, 2020. The band contributed a cover of the Metallica song "Nothing Else Matters" to the charity tribute album The Metallica Blacklist, released in September 2021. The band's ninth studio album, the self-titled My Morning Jacket, was released on October 22, 2021. Its first single, "Regularly Scheduled Programming", debuted on August 24 along with an accompanying music video. On November 24, 2023, they released their first Christmas LP Happy Holiday!.

In March 2024, the band announced that they would do an East Coast tour with Nathaniel Rateliff that fall. While on tour, the band released a single titled "Aren’t We One?" which they performed live on tour and would be part of an upcoming album. Later that month, the band released their tenth studio album, Is, which was met with critical acclaim. On January 29, 2026, the band surprise released a compilation album, featuring with acoustic renditions, covers and protest songs, entitled Peacelands.

== Band members ==
=== Current ===
- Jim James – lead vocals, guitar (1998–present)
- Tom Blankenship – bass guitar (1999–present)
- Patrick Hallahan – drums, percussion (2002–present)
- Bo Koster – keyboards, percussion, backing vocals (2004–present)
- Carl Broemel – guitar, pedal steel, saxophone, backing vocals (2004–present)

=== Former ===
- Johnny Quaid – guitar, backing vocals (1998–2004)
- J. Glenn – drums, percussion (1998–2000)
- Danny Cash – keyboards (2000–2004)
- Chris "KC" Guetig – drums, percussion (2000–2002)

== Discography ==
=== Studio albums ===
- The Tennessee Fire (1999)
- At Dawn (2001)
- It Still Moves (2003)
- Z (2005)
- Evil Urges (2008)
- Circuital (2011)
- The Waterfall (2015)
- The Waterfall II (2020)
- My Morning Jacket (2021)
- Is (2025)
