= The First Solution =

1995 speech by novelist Toni Morrison

"The First Solution" is a speech delivered by novelist Toni Morrison at Howard University on March 3, 1995, in Washington, D.C. Morrison gave the address as the featured speaker at Howard's opening convocation on the occasion of the 128th anniversary of its Charter Day. The address serves to celebrate the legacy of Howard University and their achievements. In the middle portion of her speech, Morrison turns to the subjects of racism and fascism in the United States, a theme she first raised in her Nobel Prize lecture (1993) and returned to in later addresses at Smith College (2001) and for PEN America (2008). An excerpt from "The First Solution" was published as a separate essay titled "Racism and Fascism" (1995) and included in collections of Morrison's work. A transcription of the original, unedited speech was published by the University Press of Mississippi in 2008.

== Background ==
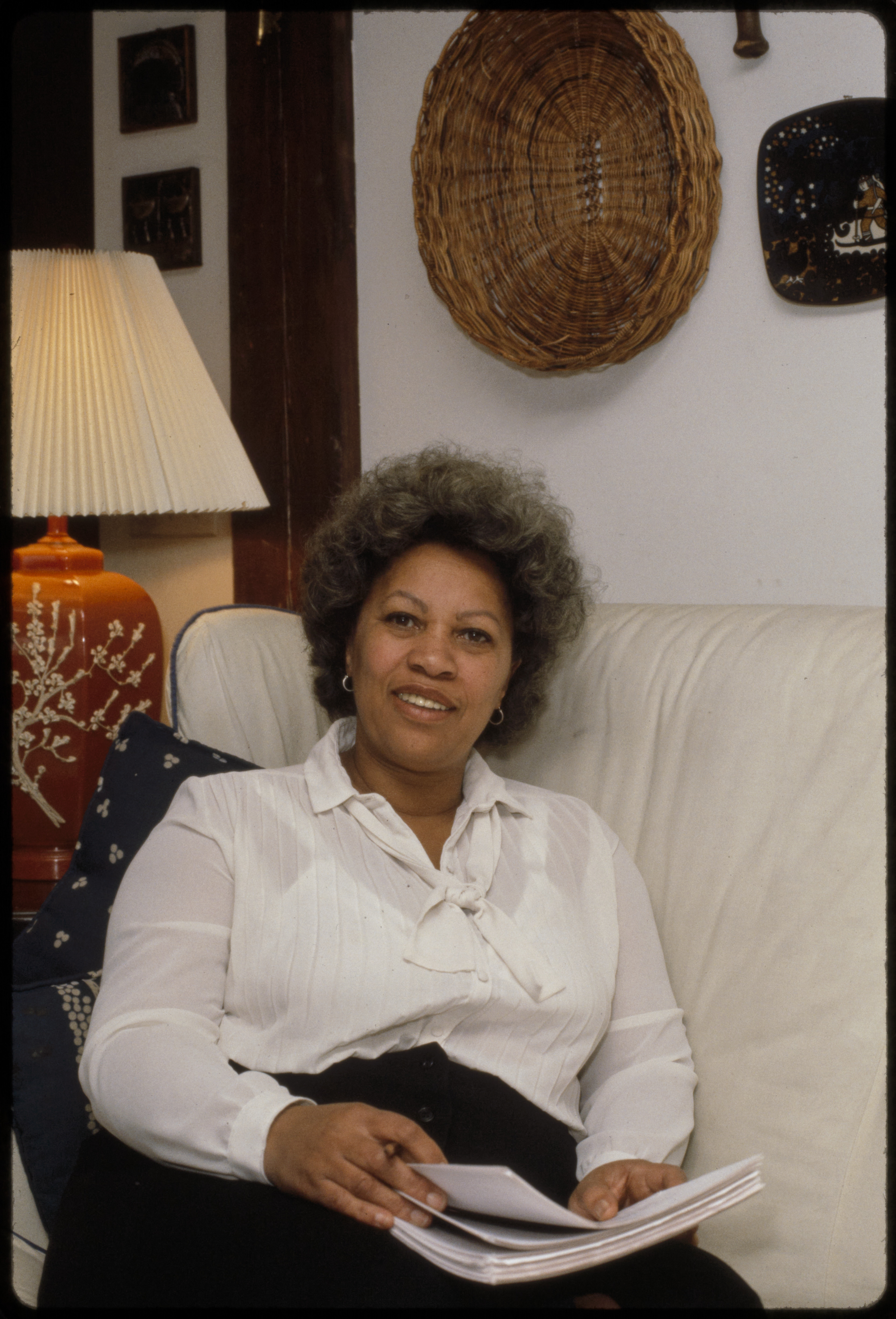
Toni Morrison in New York (n.d.) (Bernard Gotfryd)

Novelist Toni Morrison, a member of the Class of 1953 and a former instructor at Howard University in 1957, was the featured speaker at Howard on March 3, 1995. At the time, she was 64 years old and the Robert F. Goheen Chair in the Humanities at Princeton University. The event commemorated the 128th anniversary of its Charter Day, observed the previous day, March 2. Prior to her speech, the school was led in prayer by Dean of the Chapel Bernard Richardson, whose theme focused on how adversity builds strength and resilience. This was followed by an introduction and welcome to Charter Day by Interim President Joyce Ladner, the first woman to hold the position at Howard.

The university choir then performed selections from Messiah (1741) by George Frideric Handel with live orchestral accompaniment. Ladner followed up with an announcement of six awards for distinguished Howard University people. Board of trustees and Chairman Wayman Smith then joined Ladner to award Morrison an honorary Doctorate of Letters. She then delivered a 22 minute convocation speech which was filmed by C-SPAN and later aired on April 1 and April 2.

The speech, titled "The First Solution", alludes to the creeping and incremental nature of racism and fascism that leads to an outcome like the Final Solution, the Nazi plan to exterminate the Jewish people. "Let us be reminded", Morrison writes, "That before there is a final solution, there must be a first solution, a second one, even a third. The move toward a final solution is not a jump. It takes one step, then another, then another." At the time of the speech, the United States was still significantly involved in the war on drugs and was increasingly moving toward the militarization of its police. Racialized beliefs fueled a moral panic over the so-called "superpredator". This racially charged environment contributed to the rise of mass incarceration, with the United States imprisoning more people per capita than any other country in the world.

== Speech ==
Morrison begins by recognizing Howard University for breaking the barriers to education for African Americans in the 19th century, fighting against racism, discrimination and segregation in the 20th century, leading the early civil rights movement, and contributing to her own development as a novelist while she was an instructor at the school. She calls on the university to muster the same fortitude they had fighting past battles and to bring that strength to new battles in the present. Morrison then launches into what she describes as a kind of "scenario" or thought experiment, not based on fiction like her novels, but on the current concerns of the day.

She begins by proposing that the process towards a "final solution" starts with a series of steps, beginning with step one, the invention of an "internal enemy", which becomes the subject of attention as well as an object of distraction. In step two, the newly identified internal enemy is isolated and targeted using a rhetorical and ideological strategy of linguistic aggression, dog whistles, and culturally loaded demonization. Next, in step three, the demonizing narratives are strategically amplified by the media for material and political gain. In step four, all forms of art and cultural expression are tightly controlled.

Step five involves the vilification of anyone who advocates for the so-called enemy. In step six, collaborators are identified and taken from the ranks of the enemy who can then help whitewash their own loss of rights. Next, in step seven, the enemy is labeled as sick or abnormal and false ideas about racial supremacy are repeated to give the appearance of truth. In step eight, the enemy is labeled as a criminal and detention centers are funded and built to confine the men and children. This is followed by step nine where media attention is bestowed upon those who remain indifferent and uncritical, giving them the appearance of control and influence. Finally, step ten: silence. Fascism, Morrison tells the audience, is the "succubus twin" of racism. It may arrive under any name or political party, as it gives only lip service to ideology but in reality seeks out power. Out of a fear of democracy, it tears down public institutions and privatizes everything, transforming the value of humanity itself into mere notions of property and ownership.

Closing out the speech, Morrison leaves the audience with a warning that the future of education and the university itself is in danger, as they must struggle to protect their hard-won freedoms. She ends the speech by placing her faith in the next generation, who are responsible for creating and leading the new generations that follow.

== Reception ==
David Streitfeld of The Washington Post described Morrison's speech as a "call to arms", noting that her speech may have alluded to the controversy surrounding the book The Bell Curve (1994) by Richard J. Herrnstein and Charles Murray. The book has been accused by critics of promoting scientific racism, an idea that Morrison addresses in several parts of her speech including in step seven ("Pathologize the enemy in scholarly and popular mediums; recycle, for example, scientific racism and the myths of racial superiority in order to naturalize the pathology") and in her closing remarks about academia, calling for them to get involved in the debate.

Streitfeld described the crowd's response to the speech as "muted", but Morrison's comments about Coca-Cola during the speech were enthusiastically received by the audience to the point that she had to stop speaking due to a loud round of applause: "Conservative, moderate, liberal; right, left, hard left, far right; religious, secular, socialist — we must not be blindsided by these Pepsi-Cola, Coca-Cola labels because the genius of fascism is that any political structure can host the virus and virtually any developed country can become a suitable home. Fascism talks ideology, but it is really just marketing — marketing for power."

Writer and professor Roxane Gay, philosopher Jason Stanley, and cultural critic Henry Giroux describe Morrison's 1995 speech as prescient in its scope and in its concern with the normalization of fascism. Gay notes that even though Morrison's speech was written decades before the rise of Trump, its concerns about fascism and the call to bring more humanity to the table to meet the threat of "losing our humanity" still remains relevant today.

Stanley argues that Morrison was not interested in focusing on the leaders or governments themselves, but rather, as she herself puts it, the "forces interested in fascist solutions to national problems" that sought to legitimize it. Morrison believed, according to Stanley, that the history of racism and fascism in the United States threatened to give rise to a new movement built on those forces. Giroux frames the speech as a criticism of neoliberalism and fascism, and applies Morrison's insights from 1995 to modern American authoritarianism in the era of Trumpism.

== Related work ==
Morrison became the first black woman to win the Nobel Prize in Literature in 1993. In her December 7 Nobel Prize lecture, Morrison discussed the fundamental nature of language as an instrument of liberation and domination, as a creative and a destructive force that can be used to promote understanding or to restrict it. Morrison argues that oppressive language leads to violence and suppression of knowledge. She makes the case that the kind of language we use in law, academia, science, media, and by the state, often disguises racial hierarchies and supports fascist ideologies by portraying discriminatory ideas as facts. She points out that language based on racism, sexism, and theism serves to control the discourse, inhibit free thinking, and block understanding. This kind of language, Morrison maintains, needs to be rejected and exposed.

Two years after the Nobel prize lecture, Morrison delivered "The First Solution" speech at Howard University. An excerpt from that speech was published in a separate essay titled "Racism and Fascism". The essay appeared in both The Nation and in The Journal of Negro Education, and was later included in the compilation The Source of Self-Regard (2019), published in the UK as Mouth Full of Blood. A transcription of the original, unedited speech was eventually published by the University Press of Mississippi in What Moves at the Margin (2008).

Six years later, Morrison returned to her concerns about fascism in her commencement address at Smith College on May 20, 2001. In her speech, she warns the graduating class about what she sees as a threat to an "inhabitable humane future" by a coalition of political, corporate, and military groups, who are, in her opinion, working to bring about a kind of fascism with the help of a "quisling" media. In the speech, she predicts, "We can no longer rely on the separation of powers to keep this country invulnerable to that possibility".

Just less than a decade later, Morrison received the PEN/Borders Literary Service Award at the PEN Literary Gala at the American Museum of Natural History on April 28, 2008. In her acceptance speech, she argued that both authoritarians and the writers they attack face a kind of "peril": the powerful fear the writers who expose their misdeeds, while the writers fear the consequences of exposing truths the authoritarians wish to keep silent. To prevent writers from uncovering these uncomfortable truths, the powerful turn to censorship, surveillance, and violence. Morrison believes it is important to protect writers and the value of freedom of expression they uphold, because they are the watchdogs of democracy who speak truth to power. An essay entitled "Peril" was later adapted from Morrison's speech and published in the PEN collection Burn This Book (2008).
