= 1993 Nobel Prize in Literature =

- Toni Morrison
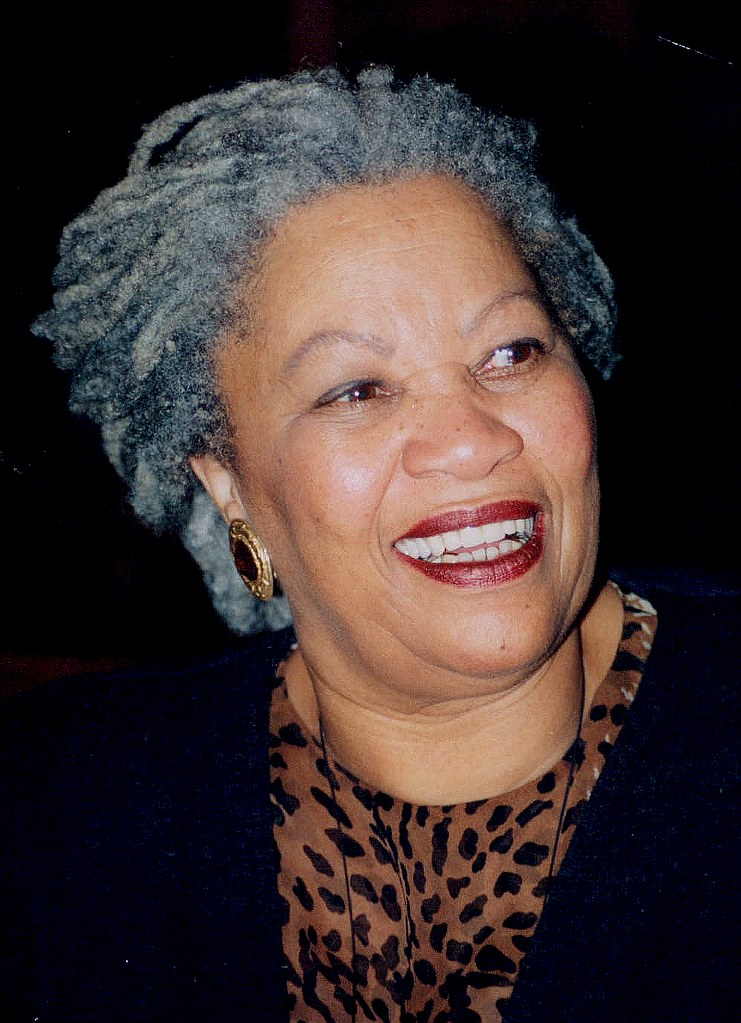
- "who in novels characterized by visionary force and poetic import, gives life to an essential aspect of American reality."
- Date: 7 October 1993 (announcement); 10 December 1993 (ceremony)
- Location: Stockholm, Sweden
- Presented by: Swedish Academy
- First award: 1901
- Website: Official website

The 1993 Nobel Prize in Literature was awarded to the African-American novelist Toni Morrison (1931–2019) "who in novels characterized by visionary force and poetic import, gives life to an essential aspect of American reality." Morrison was awarded before the third novel of the Beloved Trilogy was published. She became the first black woman of any nationality and the second American woman to win the prize since Pearl S. Buck in 1938. She is also the 8th woman to receive the prize.

== Laureate ==
Toni Morrison's works revolve around African Americans; both their history and their situation in our own time. Her works often depict difficult circumstances and the dark side of humanity, but still convey integrity and redemption. The way she reveals the stories of individual lives conveys insight into, understanding of, and empathy for her characters.

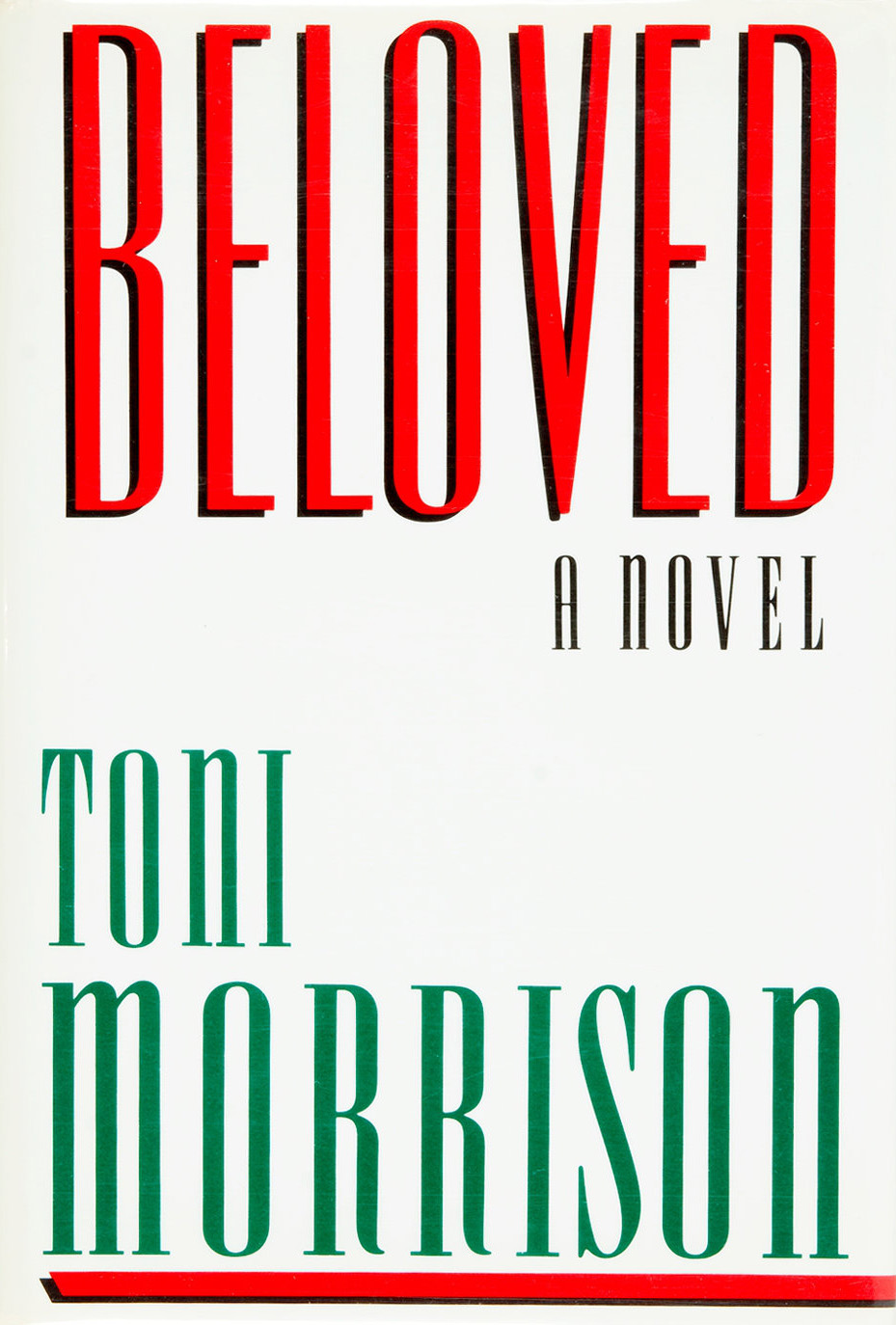
First-edition dust jacket cover of Beloved (1987).

Morrison's unique narrative technique has developed with each new work. Among her well-known novels include The Bluest Eye (1970), Song of Solomon (1977), Beloved (1987), A Mercy (2008), and Home (2012).

== Reactions ==
Toni Morrison was seen as a surprise choice. The strongest candidates according to the Swedish press were Hugo Claus, a Belgian poet, playwright and filmmaker who wrote in Flemish; Seamus Heaney, an Irish poet who had been a front-runner for some time (awarded eventually on 1995); Bei Dao, a Chinese poet in exile; and the Syria-born Lebanese poet Adonis. Joyce Carol Oates and Thomas Pynchon, were American contenders mentioned in speculations. Commenting on the choice of Toni Morrison, Henry Louis Gates Jr., the chairman of the Afro-American studies department at Harvard University said: "Just two centuries ago, the African-American literary tradition was born in slave narratives. Now our greatest writer has won the Nobel Prize." "She's a masterful craftsperson, which people tend to overlook. She is as great and as innovative as Faulkner and Garcia Marquez and Woolf. That's why she deserved the Nobel Prize."

== Nobel lecture ==
Morrison delivered a Nobel lecture on December 7, 1993 about a "fable about the power of language to elucidate and cloud, to oppress and liberate, to honor and sully, and to both quantify and be incapable of capturing a human experience."

In her acceptance speech, Morrison described the importance of language in our lives, saying: "We die. That may be the meaning of life. But we do language. That may be the measure of our lives."

== Award ceremony ==
At the award ceremony in Stockholm on 10 December 1993, Sture Allén, permanent secretary of the Swedish Academy, said:

In her depictions of the world of the black people, in life as in legend, Toni Morrison has given the Afro-American people their history back, piece by piece. In this perspective, her work is uncommonly consonant. At the same time, it is richly variegated. The reader derives vast pleasure from her superb narrative technique, shifting from novel to novel and marked by original development, although it is related to Faulkner and to the Latin American tradition. Toni Morrison’s novels invite the reader to partake at many levels, and at varying degrees of complexity. Still, the most enduring impression they leave is of empathy, compassion with one’s fellow human beings.
