= Love (Morrison novel) =

2003 novel by Toni Morrison

- Cover of the first edition
- Author: Toni Morrison
- Language: English
- Genre: African-American literature
- Publisher: Alfred A. Knopf
- Publication date: 2003
- Publication place: United States
- Media type: Print (hardback & paperback)
- Pages: 208 pp
- ISBN: 978-0-375-40944-8
- OCLC: 52039575
- Dewey Decimal: 813/.54 21
- LC Class: PS3563.O8749 L68 2003
- Preceded by: Paradise
- Followed by: A Mercy

Love (2003) is the eighth novel by Toni Morrison. Written in Morrison's non-linear style, the novel tells of the lives of several women and their relationships to the late Bill Cosey.

Cosey was a charismatic hotel owner, and the people around him were affected by his life — even long after his death. The main characters are Christine, his granddaughter and Heed, his widow. The two are the same age and used to be friends but some forty years after Cosey's death they are sworn enemies, and yet share his mansion. Morrison uses split narrative and jumps back and forth throughout the story, not fully unfolding until the very end. The characters in the novel all have some relation to Bill Cosey.

Similar to the concept of communication between the living and the dead in her 1987 novel Beloved, Morrison introduced a character named Junior; she was the medium to connect the dead Bill Cosey to the world of the living.

The storytelling techniques in Love, namely the split narrative, suggest a recent trend in Morrison's literature that divides the plot among different time periods.

== Critical reception ==
Elaine Showalter, writing in The Guardian, praised it as "a disarmingly compact, unpompous book ... full of quirky, perverse characters and provocative, unfashionable ideas." In The New York Times, Laura Miller compared Love favorably to some of Morrison's earlier works, such as Beloved and Sula.
