= The Source of Self-Regard: Selected Essays, Speeches, and Meditations =

2019 non-fiction book by Toni Morrison

- Author: Toni Morrison
- Language: English
- Publisher: Alfred A. Knopf
- Publication date: February 12, 2019
- Publication place: United States
- Pages: 354
- ISBN: 9780525521037

The Source of Self-Regard: Selected Essays, Speeches, and Meditations, published in 2019 by Alfred A. Knopf in the U.S., is a non-fiction book by Toni Morrison, in which are collected 43 pieces of writing, structured into three sections: "The Foreigner’s Home", "Black Matter(s)" and “God's Language". The collection was also published in the U.K. in 2019 by Chatto & Windus under the title Mouth Full of Blood: Essays, Speeches, Meditations.

As summarized in R. O. Kwon's review for The Guardian, "there are 40 years of her essays, speeches and meditations, including her thoughts and arguments about politics, art and writing. The book contains exhortations and transcribed question-and-answer sessions, reflections and analyses, exegeses and commencement talks."

== Reception ==
James McBride, writing in The New York Times, says in praise of the collection: "This book demonstrates once again that Morrison is more than the standard-bearer of American literature. ...Toni Morrison does not belong to black America. She doesn't belong to white America. She is not 'one of us.' She is all of us. She is not one nation. She is every nation."

On NPR, Ericka Taylor observed that, while spanning four decades, the book "speaks to today's social and political moment as directly as this morning's headlines."

The reviewer for the New Statesman notes that the pieces in the book "demonstrate the writer's enduring eagerness to examine the contradictions of being both 'native' and 'alien' to her own country", going on to state that "the reader is grateful for an author allowing, encouraging even, such intimate access to their work, thought and reflections on eternal concepts: knowledge, 'separateness', the future of time. Regarding the latter, for all her justified pessimism, Morrison faintly entertains the possibility of a future as far-reaching as the past, shaped by those who have been “pressed to the margins”. Should we see an end to our “current disequilibria”, she suggests, we may discover that “history is not dead, but that it is about to take its first unfettered breath”. "

== See also ==
- "Racism and Fascism", an essay from the collection
