= God Help the Child =

2015 novel by Toni Morrison

- Cover of the first edition
- Author: Toni Morrison
- Language: English
- Genre: African-American literature
- Publisher: Alfred A. Knopf Inc
- Publication date: April 30, 2015
- Publication place: United States
- Media type: Print
- Pages: 192
- ISBN: 0307740927
- Preceded by: Home

God Help the Child is the 11th and final novel by American writer Toni Morrison. News of the book, as well as the title and opening line, were released in December 2014. The novel's original title, preferred by Morrison herself, is The Wrath of Children.

== Release ==
On February 9, 2015, The New Yorker published an excerpt from the work under the title "Sweetness", the opening lines being: "It's not my fault. So you can't blame me. I didn't do it and have no idea how it happened."

God Help the Child was first published by Alfred A. Knopf on April 30, 2015.

== Plot ==
Lula Ann "Bride" Bridewell, a woman with dark "blue-black" skin, was neglected and abused by her light-skinned parents, who are ashamed of her. When she was a child, her mother Sweetness punished Bride for her dark skin, which ended her marriage: Sweetness's husband Louis could not bring himself to love a child with skin as dark as Bride's. Bride grew up without love, tenderness, affection or apology; Sweetness believes she is protecting her child from a world that would be even more judgmental of Bride's skin.

As a young adult, Bride dates a man named Booker Starbern. After finding out her plan to give gifts to Sofia Huxley, a woman just released from prison after being convicted of child sexual abuse, Booker tells Bride she's not the woman he wants, ultimately leaving her.

Since Bride works in the beauty industry, she brings Sofia a gift of skincare products. Bride goes to her door and explains to her how she was one of the students who falsely testified against the ex-teacher. Bride had lied about Sofia in order to win some affection from Sweetness, a plan that had worked. Sofia had been imprisoned for fifteen years as a result, where she'd been mistreated by guards and other inmates. Sofia was thus furious with Bride, who had upended her life, beating Bride and throwing her into the street.

Needing support, Bride calls her coworker Brooklyn, a white woman with thick dreadlocks, to help her. Brooklyn prides herself on being able to understand people beyond what they say, a skill she developed growing in an unstable home near an uncle by whom she was molested. Hoping to take Bride's job, Brooklyn encourages Bride to take some time away from the office. She knows Bride is lying about being beaten by a man in the street.

As Bride recovers, her body begins changing: she loses her curvy figure, her ear piercings heal up, and she begins feeling forgetful. She eventually receives a bill in the mail from a repair shop, addressed to Booker. She pays his bill and follows the return address. Bride wrecks her car on the way, and is found by a white girl, Rain, who brings her guardian to get her out of the vehicle. While she recovers and gets her car fixed, she stays with the couple and Rain, learning that they are poor activists. Rain tells her that her current guardians had kidnapped her, though she is happy about it. Her birth mother was sex trafficking her, but had kicked her out when she bit one of the men who assaulted her. They had found Rain behind a dumpster and carried her home with them. Bride is the only person who lets Rain speak about her past, and Rain is sad when Bride leaves.

After she heals and leaves, Bride finds Booker's favorite aunt, Queen, and gets advice and Booker's new address from her. She gets in an altercation with Booker and afterward quickly falls asleep. When she wakes up, she learns about Booker's personal history. His favorite brother had been assaulted and killed by a pedophile as a young child. His family tried to not speak about the event or his brother, and Booker felt as though he was the only one who remembered him. This led to him leaving his family and only keeping contact with Queen, who encouraged Booker to hold on to his brother's memory. Bride understands that he'd left her because he thought Sofia Huxley had actually abused children, and that Bride was condoning this in bringing her a gift. Bride explains that she had falsely accused Sofia, and the couple make up.

Shortly after, Queen's house catches on fire after she burns her box-springs outside, resulting in her injury. Bride and Booker take shifts watching over her at the hospital, though Queen soon passes away. Booker gives Queen a private funeral service, though he is frustrated with his uninspired trumpet playing and throws his instrument away. When he returns to the car, Bride tells him she is pregnant with his child. He responds positively, looking forward to their future.

The book ends with Sweetness having received the news of her grandchild with no return address. She reflects that she was not the best mother, but she argues times were different and since blue-black women were not represented in magazines, she did not think anybody would receive Bride well. She believes that Bride will mess up as a mother in a different but equal way with her child, commenting, "God help the child."

== Reception ==
Morrison and her publishers announced they were publishing the book in December 2014, causing Gawker to jokingly proclaim it the best novel of 2015 based on the synopsis and Morrison's previous work alone. The novel was listed by publications including The Globe and Mail, Publishers Weekly and The New York Times as one of their most anticipated book releases of 2015.

Artist Kara Walker writing for The New York Times negatively compared the novel to previous works by Morrison, saying that “the abundance of first-person confessionals does little to invite actual intimacy.” Ron Charles writing for The Washington Post compared the novel unfavorably to Morrison's debut novel The Bluest Eye (1970), criticizing the characters in her latest work as people with "no interior life". Similarly the review by Razia Iqbal for The Independent complained that the characters were "too didactic on the page: prototypes for an idea rather than real people."

In a review for The Guardian, writer Roxane Gay concluded: "God Help the Child is the kind of novel where you can feel the magnificence just beyond your reach. The writing and storytelling are utterly compelling, but so much is frustratingly flawed....Yet still, there is that magnificence, burning beneath the surface of every word. The language, shifts in point of view and the audacity of the novel’s premise are overwhelming. Morrison remains an incredibly powerful writer who commands attention no matter the story she is telling."
