= The Origin of Others =

2017 non-fiction book by Toni Morrison

- Author: Toni Morrison
- Language: English
- Genre: Non-fiction
- Publisher: Harvard University Press
- Publication date: 2017
- Publication place: United States
- Media type: Print (hardcover)
- Pages: 126
- ISBN: 978-0674976450

The Origin of Others, published in 2017, is a non-fiction book by Toni Morrison, published in the U.S. by Harvard University Press with a Foreword by Ta-Nehisi Coates. As the review from The Guardian notes: "This is a book not about racial difference (there is, after all, as Morrison notes, only one human race) but about the possibilities and responsibilities of literature."
