= Desdemona (play) =

Play by Toni Morrison

- First edition
- Author: Toni Morrison
- Language: English
- Genre: Play
- Publisher: Oberon Books
- Publication date: 19 July 2012
- Publication place: United Kingdom
- Media type: Print (Paperback)
- Pages: 64 pp (Paperback edition)
- ISBN: 978-1-849-43389-1 (Paperback edition)
- OCLC: 808600872

Desdemona is a play by Toni Morrison. It was first produced in Vienna in May 2011. The title character of the play is Desdemona, the wife of the title character in Shakespeare's Othello. The 2011 play arose from a collaboration between Morrison, director Peter Sellars, and musician Rokia Traoré. About a decade earlier, Morrison and Sellars had disagreed about Shakespeare’s play, which Sellars detested, but Morrison valued. They agreed that Sellars would stage “Othello” and Morrison would respond to in another way, resulting in her Desdemona.

The play revolves around Desdemona's relationship with her mother's maid "Barbary." In Morrison's work, Barbary is envisioned as an African woman, suggested by the name "Barbary" being a reference to northern Africa (the "Barbary coast") in Shakespeare's day. This also gives Desdemona an emotional connection with African people dating back to her childhood.

Morrison's play marks the third major play focusing on Shakespeare's Desdemona composed by a modern female playwright, following Desdemona: A Play about a Handkerchief (1993) by Paula Vogel, and Goodnight Desdemona (Good Morning Juliet) (1988) by Ann-Marie MacDonald. All three plays have highly divergent interpretations of the character of Desdemona.

The official playscript of Desdemona was published in 2012 by Oberon Books, with a foreword written by the director Peter Sellars.

== Performances ==
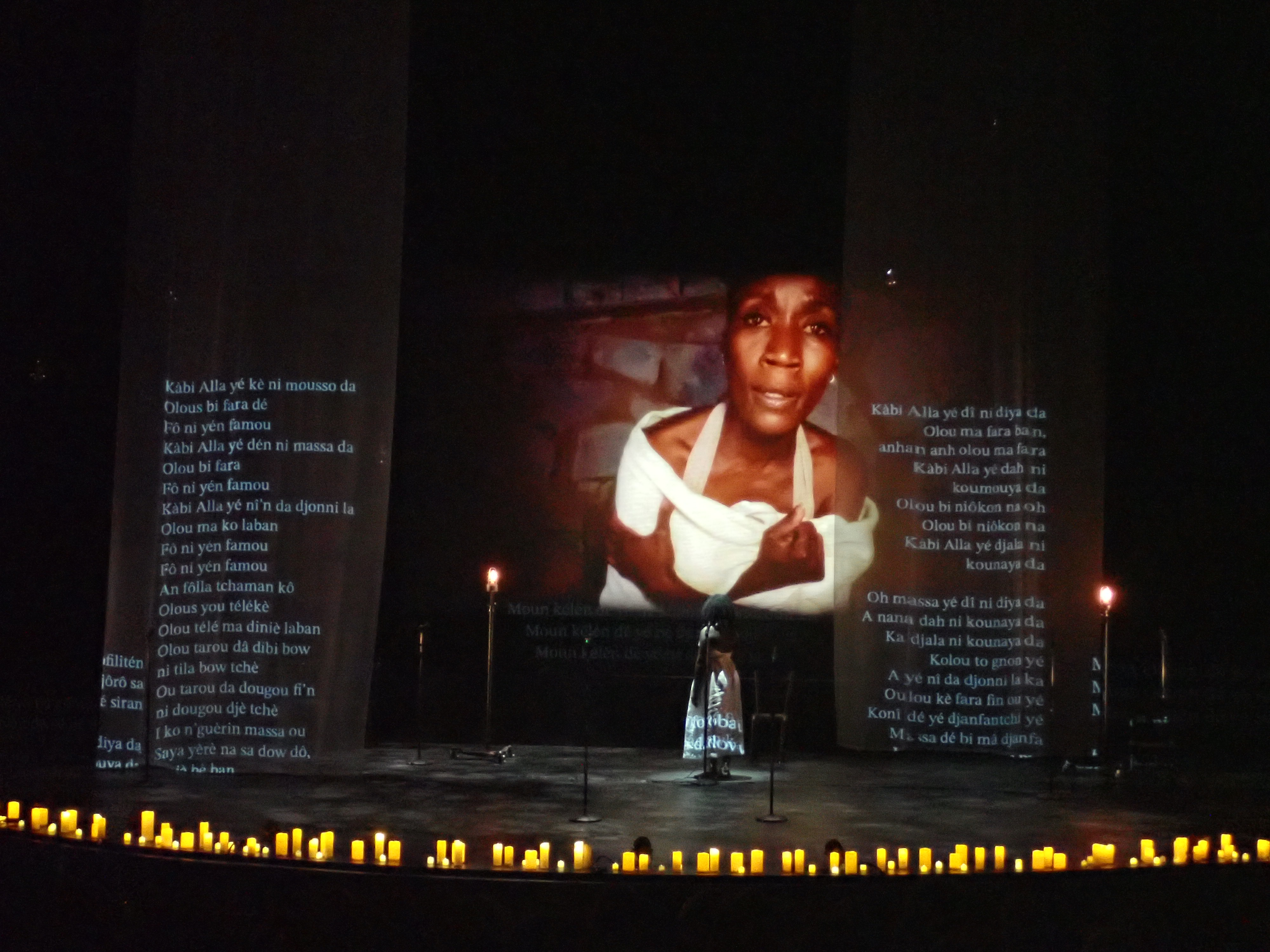
A moment from the 2023 performance of the play at Cornell University featuring Rokia Traoré.

- May 15, 17-21, 2011 - Theater Akzent - Vienna, Austria
- May 26–29, 2011 - Theatre Royal Flamand (KVS) - Brussels, Belgium
- October 13–21, 2011 - Nanterre-Amandiers theatre, Nanterre, France
- October 26–29, 2011 - Zellerbach Playhouse, Berkeley, United States
- November 2–3, 2011 - Rose Theater - New York, United States
- November 10–12, 2011 - Haus der Berliner Festspiele - Berlin, Germany
- July 2012 - Barbican Centre - London, England
- June 11–13, 2013 - Holland Festival, Amsterdam, the Netherlands
- November 2013 - Edna Manley College of the Visual and Performing Arts: School of Drama - Kingston, Jamaica
- October 8–11, 2015 - UCLA's Freud Playhouse, Los Angeles, United States
- October 16–19, 2015 - Southbank Theatre, Melbourne, Australia
- April 16, 2019 - Sanders Theater, Cambridge, MA
- October 27 - 28, 2023 - Kiplinger Theatre, Cornell University, NY
