= Toni Morrison =

American novelist and editor (1931–2019)

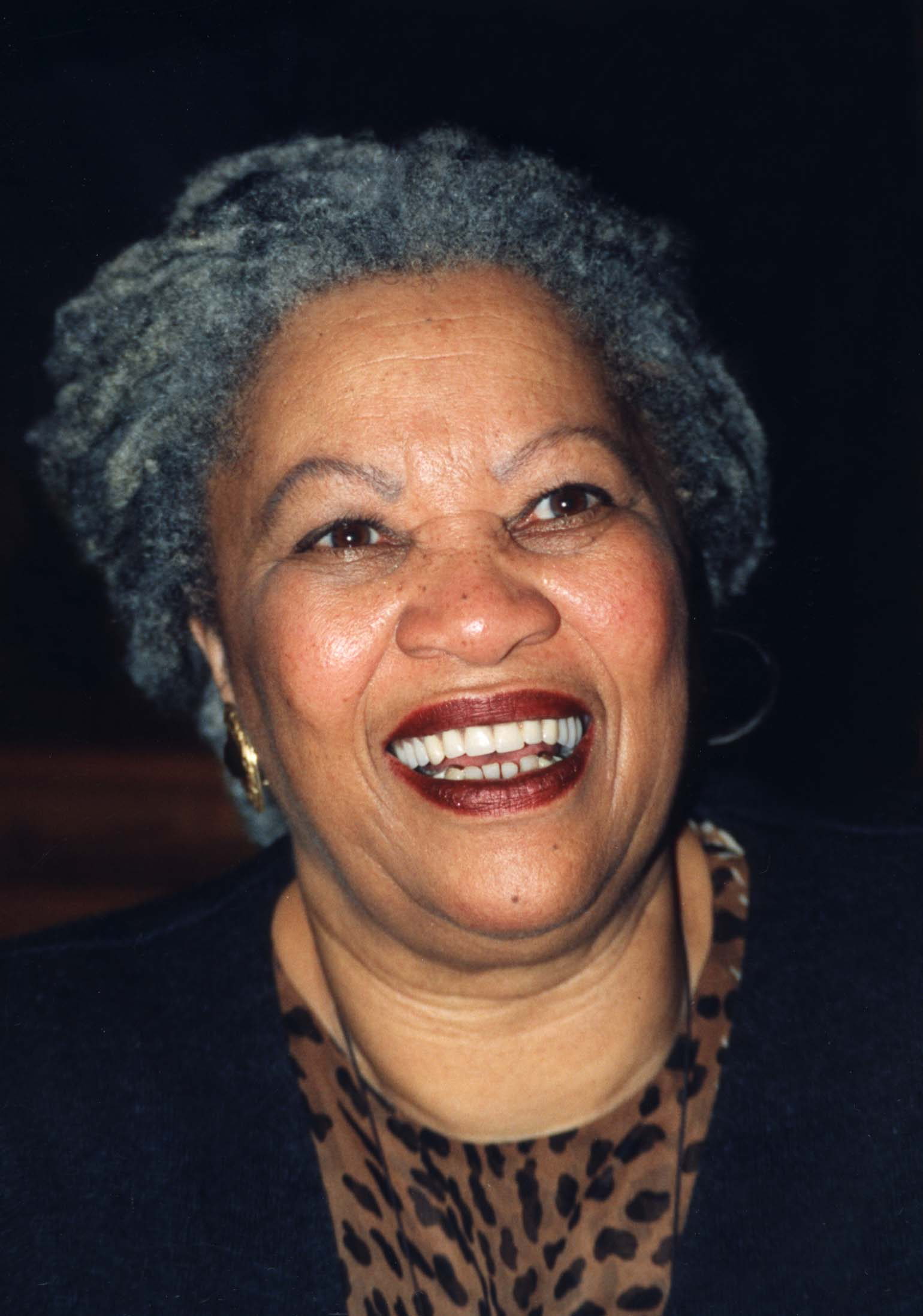
- Morrison in 1998
- Born: Chloe Ardelia Wofford; February 18, 1931; Lorain, Ohio, U.S.
- Died: August 5, 2019 (aged 88); The Bronx, New York City, U.S.
- Education: Howard University (BA); Cornell University (MA)
- Occupations: Novelist; essayist; children's writer; professor
- Spouse: Harold Morrison (m. 1958; div. 1964)
- Children: 2
- Writing career
- Genre: Literary fiction
- Works: The Bluest Eye (1970); Sula (1973); Song of Solomon (1977); Tar Baby (1981); Beloved (1987)
- Notable awards: Presidential Medal of Freedom; National Humanities Medal; Nobel Prize in Literature; Pulitzer Prize for Fiction
- Quotations related to Toni Morrison at Wikiquote

Chloe Anthony Wofford "Toni" Morrison (born Chloe Ardelia Wofford; February 18, 1931 – August 5, 2019) was an American novelist and editor. She was awarded the Nobel Prize in Literature in 1993. Her first novel, The Bluest Eye, was published in 1970. The critically acclaimed Song of Solomon (1977) brought her national attention and won the National Book Critics Circle Award. In 1988, Morrison won the Pulitzer Prize for Beloved (1987). Some of her other works include Sula (1973) and the short story "Recitatif" (1983).

Born and raised in Lorain, Ohio, Morrison graduated from Howard University in 1953 with a B.A. in English. Morrison earned a master's degree in American Literature from Cornell University in 1955. In 1957 she returned to Howard University, was married, and had two children before divorcing in 1964. Morrison became the first Black female editor for fiction at Random House in New York City in the late 1960s. She developed her own reputation as an author in the 1970s and '80s. Her novel Beloved was made into a film in 1998. Morrison's works are praised for addressing the harsh consequences of racism in the United States and the Black American experience.

The National Endowment for the Humanities selected Morrison for the Jefferson Lecture, the U.S. federal government's highest honor for achievement in the humanities, in 1996. She was honored with the National Book Foundation's Medal of Distinguished Contribution to American Letters the same year. President Barack Obama presented her with the Presidential Medal of Freedom on May 29, 2012. She received the PEN/Saul Bellow Award for Achievement in American Fiction in 2016. Morrison was inducted into the National Women's Hall of Fame in 2020.

== Early years ==
Toni Morrison was born Chloe Ardelia Wofford, the second of four children from a working-class, black family, in Lorain, Ohio, west of Cleveland, to Ramah (née Willis) and George Wofford. Her mother was born in Greenville, Alabama, and moved north with her family as a child. She was a homemaker and a devout member of the African Methodist Episcopal Church. George Wofford grew up in Cartersville, Georgia. When Wofford was about 15 years old, a group of white people lynched two African-American businessmen who lived on his street. Morrison later said: "He never told us that he'd seen bodies. But he had seen them. And that was too traumatic, I think, for him." Soon after the lynching, George Wofford moved to the racially integrated town of Lorain, Ohio, in the hope of escaping racism and securing gainful employment in Ohio's burgeoning industrial economy. He worked odd jobs and as a welder for U.S. Steel. In a 2015 interview Morrison said that her father, traumatized by his experiences of racism, hated white people so much he would not let them in the house.

When Morrison was about two years old, her family's landlord set fire to the house in which they lived, while they were home, because her parents could not afford to pay rent. Her family responded to what she called this "bizarre form of evil" by laughing at the landlord rather than falling into despair. Morrison later said her family's response demonstrated how to keep your integrity and claim your own life in the face of acts of such "monumental crudeness".

Morrison's parents instilled in her a sense of heritage and language through telling traditional African-American folktales, ghost stories, and singing songs. She read frequently as a child; among her favorite authors were Jane Austen and Leo Tolstoy.

Morrison became a Catholic at the age of 12 and took the baptismal name Anthony (after Anthony of Padua), which led to her nickname, Toni. Attending Lorain High School, she was on the debate team, the yearbook staff, and in the drama club.

== Career ==
=== Adulthood, Howard and Cornell years, and editing career: 1949–1975 ===
In 1949, she enrolled at Howard University in Washington, D.C., she was the 2nd of her siblings to attend college, seeking the company of fellow Black intellectuals. Initially a student in the drama program at Howard, she studied theatre with celebrated drama teachers Anne Cooke Reid and Owen Dodson. It was while at Howard that she encountered racially segregated restaurants and buses for the first time. Morrison graduated in 1953 with a bachelor's degree in English and minor in classics. While at Howard, she was able to work with key members of the Harlem Renaissance era such as Alain Locke and Sterling Brown. Additionally, she participated in the university's theater group, known as the Howard Players, where she had the opportunity to travel the Deep South, which was a defining experience of her life.

Morrison went on to earn a Master of Arts degree in 1955 from Cornell University in Ithaca, New York. Her master's thesis was titled "Virginia Woolf's and William Faulkner's treatment of the alienated". She taught English, first at Texas Southern University in Houston from 1955 to 1957, and then at Howard University for the next seven years. While teaching at Howard, she met Harold Morrison, a Jamaican architect, whom she married in 1958. Their first son was born in 1961 and she was pregnant with their second son when she and Harold divorced in 1964.

After her divorce and the birth of her son Slade in 1965, Morrison began working as an editor for L. W. Singer, a textbook division of publisher Random House, in Syracuse, New York. Two years later, she transferred to Random House in New York City, where she became their first Black woman senior editor in the fiction department.

In that capacity, Morrison played a vital role in bringing Black literature into the mainstream. One of the first books she worked on was the groundbreaking Contemporary African Literature (1972), a collection that included work by Nigerian writers Wole Soyinka, Chinua Achebe, and South African playwright Athol Fugard. She fostered a new generation of Afro-American writers, including poet and novelist Toni Cade Bambara, radical activist Angela Davis, Black Panther Huey Newton and novelist Gayl Jones, whose writing Morrison discovered. She also brought to publication the 1975 autobiography of the outspoken boxing champion Muhammad Ali, The Greatest: My Own Story. In addition, she published and promoted the work of Henry Dumas, a little-known novelist and poet who in 1968 had been shot to death by a transit officer in the New York City Subway.

Among other books that Morrison developed and edited is The Black Book (1974), an anthology of photographs, illustrations, essays, and documents of Black life in the United States from the time of slavery to the 1920s. Random House had been uncertain about the project but its publication met with a good reception. Alvin Beam reviewed the anthology for the Cleveland Plain Dealer, writing: "Editors, like novelists, have brain children – books they think up and bring to life without putting their own names on the title page. Mrs. Morrison has one of these in the stores now, and magazines and newsletters in the publishing trade are ecstatic, saying it will go like hotcakes."

=== First writings and teaching, 1970–1986 ===
Morrison had begun writing fiction as part of an informal group of poets and writers at Howard University who met to discuss their work. She attended one meeting with a short story about a Black girl who longed to have blue eyes. Morrison later developed the story as her first novel, The Bluest Eye, getting up every morning at 4 am to write, while raising two children on her own.

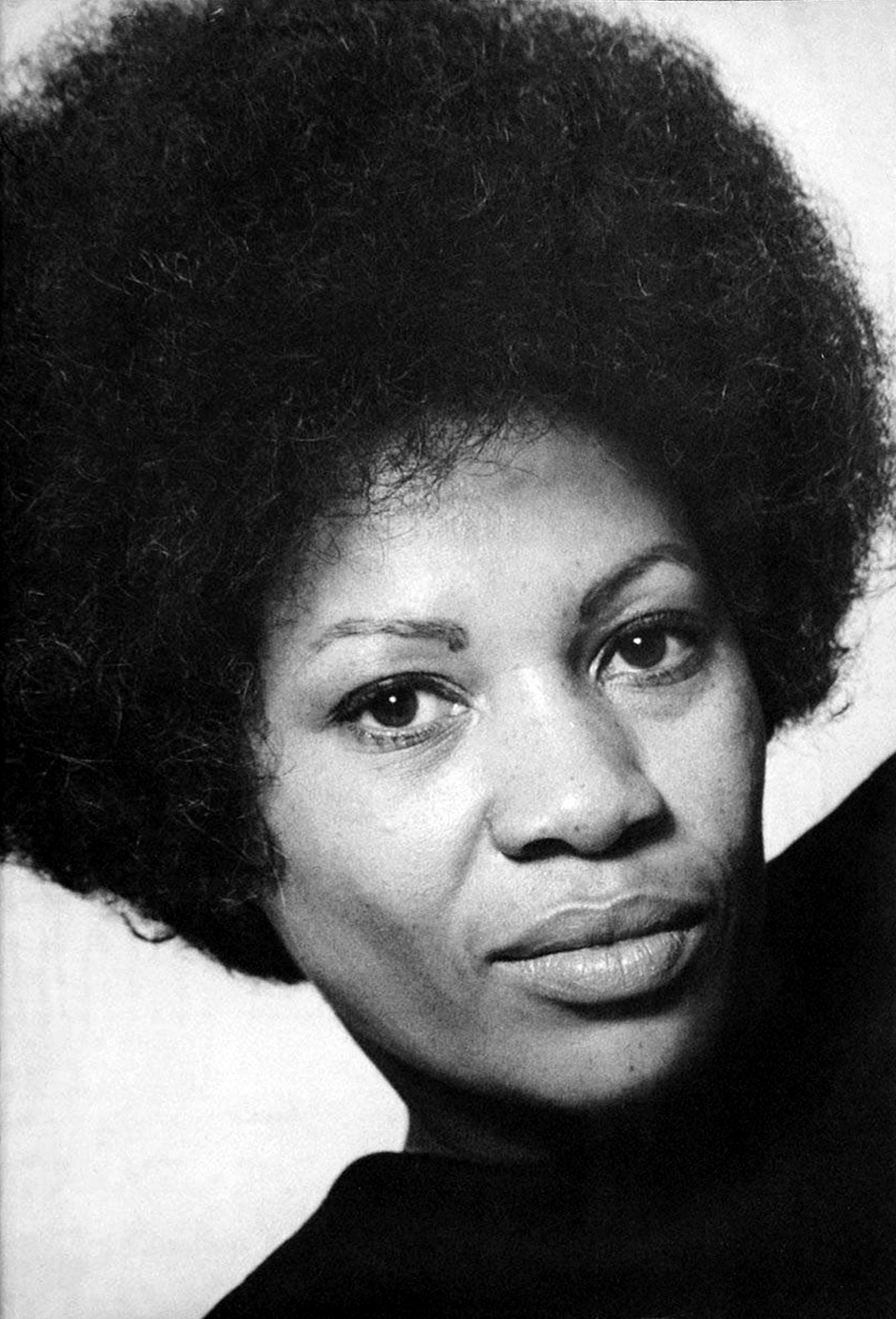
Morrison's portrait on the first-edition dust jacket of The Bluest Eye (1970)

The Bluest Eye was published by Holt, Rinehart, and Winston in 1970, when Morrison was aged 39. It was favorably reviewed in The New York Times by John Leonard, who praised Morrison's writing style as being "a prose so precise, so faithful to speech and so charged with pain and wonder that the novel becomes poetry ... But The Bluest Eye is also history, sociology, folklore, nightmare and music." The novel did not sell well at first, but the City University of New York put The Bluest Eye on its reading list for its new Black studies department, as did other colleges, which boosted sales. The book also brought Morrison to the attention of the acclaimed editor Robert Gottlieb at Knopf, an imprint of the publisher Random House. Gottlieb later edited all but one of Morrison's novels.

In 1975, Morrison's second novel Sula (1973), about a friendship between two Black women, was nominated for the National Book Award. Her third novel, Song of Solomon (1977), follows the life of Macon "Milkman" Dead III, from birth to adulthood, as he discovers his heritage. This novel brought her national acclaim, being a main selection of the Book of the Month Club, the first novel by a Black writer to be so chosen since Richard Wright's Native Son in 1940. Song of Solomon also won the National Book Critics Circle Award.

At its 1979 commencement ceremonies, Barnard College awarded Morrison its highest honor, the Barnard Medal of Distinction.

Morrison gave her next novel, Tar Baby (1981), a contemporary setting. In it, a looks-obsessed fashion model, Jadine, falls in love with Son, a penniless drifter who feels at ease with being Black.

Resigning from Random House in 1983, Morrison left publishing to devote more time to writing, while living in a converted boathouse on the Hudson River in Nyack, New York. She taught English at two branches of the State University of New York (SUNY) and at Rutgers University's New Brunswick campus. In 1984, she was appointed to an Albert Schweitzer chair at the University at Albany, SUNY.

Morrison's first play, Dreaming Emmett, is about the 1955 murder by white men of Black teenager Emmett Till. The play was commissioned by the New York State Writers Institute at the State University of New York at Albany, where she was teaching at the time. It was produced in 1986 by Capital Repertory Theatre and directed by Gilbert Moses. Morrison was also a visiting professor at Bard College from 1986 to 1988.

=== Beloved trilogy and the Nobel Prize: 1987–1998 ===
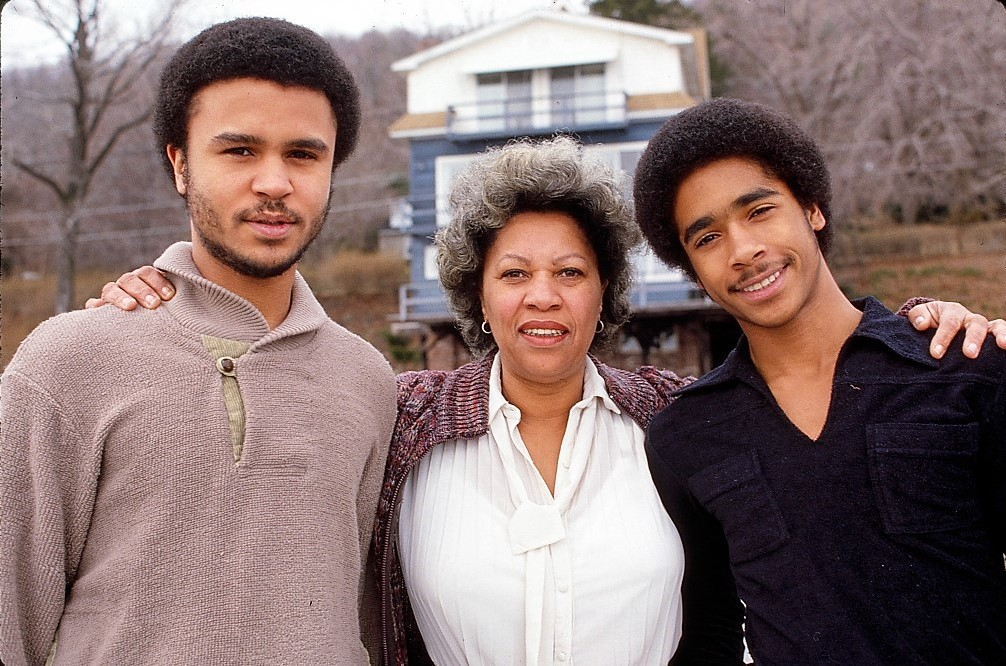
Morrison, with her sons Ford (left) and Slade (right) at their upstate New York home, between 1980 and 1987

In 1987, Morrison published her most celebrated novel, Beloved. It was inspired by the true story of an enslaved African-American woman, Margaret Garner, whose story Morrison had discovered when compiling The Black Book. Garner had escaped slavery but was pursued by slave hunters. Facing a return to slavery, Garner killed her two-year-old daughter but was captured before she could kill herself. Morrison's novel imagines the dead baby returning as a ghost, Beloved, to haunt her mother and family.

Beloved was a critical success and a bestseller for 25 weeks. The New York Times book reviewer Michiko Kakutani wrote that the scene of the mother killing her baby is "so brutal and disturbing that it appears to warp time before and after into a single unwavering line of fate". Canadian writer Margaret Atwood wrote in a review for The New York Times, "Ms. Morrison's versatility and technical and emotional range appear to know no bounds. If there were any doubts about her stature as a pre-eminent American novelist, of her own or any other generation, Beloved will put them to rest."

Some critics panned Beloved. African-American conservative social critic Stanley Crouch, for instance, complained in his review in The New Republic that the novel "reads largely like a melodrama lashed to the structural conceits of the miniseries", and that Morrison "perpetually interrupts her narrative with maudlin ideological commercials".

Despite overall high acclaim, Beloved failed to win the prestigious National Book Award or the National Book Critics Circle Award. Forty-eight Black critics and writers, among them Maya Angelou, protested the omission in a statement that The New York Times published on January 24, 1988. "Despite the international stature of Toni Morrison, she has yet to receive the national recognition that her five major works of fiction entirely deserve", they wrote. Two months later, Beloved won the Pulitzer Prize for Fiction. It also won an Anisfield-Wolf Book Award.

Beloved is the first of three novels about love and African-American history, sometimes called the Beloved Trilogy. Morrison said they are intended to be read together, explaining: "The conceptual connection is the search for the beloved – the part of the self that is you, and loves you, and is always there for you." The second novel in the trilogy, Jazz, came out in 1992. Told in language that imitates the rhythms of jazz music, the novel is about a love triangle during the Harlem Renaissance in New York City. According to Lyn Innes, "Morrison sought to change not just the content and audience for her fiction; her desire was to create stories which could be lingered over and relished, not 'consumed and gobbled as fast food', and at the same time to ensure that these stories and their characters had a strong historical and cultural base."

In 1992, Morrison also published her first book of literary criticism, Playing in the Dark: Whiteness and the Literary Imagination (1992), an examination of the African-American presence in White American literature. (In 2016, Time magazine noted that Playing in the Dark was among Morrison's most-assigned texts on U.S. college campuses, together with several of her novels and her 1993 Nobel Prize lecture.) Lyn Innes wrote in the Guardian obituary of Morrison, "Her 1990 series of Massey lectures at Harvard were published as Playing in the Dark: Whiteness and the Literary Imagination (1992), and explore the construction of a 'non-white Africanist presence and personae' in the works of Poe, Hawthorne, Melville, Cather and Hemingway, arguing that 'all of us are bereft when criticism remains too polite or too fearful to notice a disrupting darkness before its eyes'."

Before the third novel of the Beloved Trilogy was published, Morrison was awarded the Nobel Prize in Literature in 1993. The citation praised her as an author "who in novels characterized by visionary force and poetic import, gives life to an essential aspect of American reality". She was the first Black woman of any nationality to win the prize. In her acceptance speech, Morrison said: "We die. That may be the meaning of life. But we do language. That may be the measure of our lives."

In her Nobel lecture, Morrison talked about the power of storytelling. To make her point, she told a story. She spoke about a blind, old, Black woman who is approached by a group of young people. They demand of her, "Is there no context for our lives? No song, no literature, no poem full of vitamins, no history connected to experience that you can pass along to help us start strong? ... Think of our lives and tell us your particularized world. Make up a story."

Morrison received an honorary Doctor of Letters degree from Howard University during its Charter Day celebration in 1995. After the ceremony, she delivered the speech "The First Solution", excerpts of which were later published as an essay titled "Racism and Fascism". The speech discussed the ongoing threat of fascism to democracy, which she said makes inroads through a series of ten steps. Scholar Dana A. Williams writes that Morrison lays out the argument that racism "is as much a strategy used to invoke fear and to uphold fabricated hierarchies as fascism".

In 1996, the National Endowment for the Humanities selected Morrison for the Jefferson Lecture, the U.S. federal government's highest honor for "distinguished intellectual achievement in the humanities". Morrison's lecture, entitled "The Future of Time: Literature and Diminished Expectations", began with the aphorism: "Time, it seems, has no future." She cautioned against the misuse of history to diminish expectations of the future. Morrison was also honored with the 1996 National Book Foundation's Medal of Distinguished Contribution to American Letters, which is awarded to a writer "who has enriched our literary heritage over a life of service, or a corpus of work".

The third novel of her Beloved Trilogy, Paradise, about citizens of an all-Black town, came out in 1997. The following year, Morrison was on the cover of Time magazine, making her only the second female writer of fiction and second Black writer of fiction to appear on what was perhaps the most significant U.S. magazine cover of the era.

=== Beloved onscreen and "the Oprah effect" ===
Also in 1998, the movie adaptation of Beloved was released, directed by Jonathan Demme and co-produced by Oprah Winfrey, who had spent ten years bringing it to the screen. Winfrey also stars as the main character, Sethe, alongside Danny Glover as Sethe's lover, Paul D, and Thandiwe Newton as Beloved.

The movie flopped at the box office. A review in The Economist opined that "most audiences are not eager to endure nearly three hours of a cerebral film with an original storyline featuring supernatural themes, murder, rape, and slavery". Film critic Janet Maslin, in her New York Times review "No Peace from a Brutal Legacy", called it a "transfixing, deeply felt adaptation of Toni Morrison's novel. ... Its linchpin is of course Oprah Winfrey, who had the clout and foresight to bring 'Beloved' to the screen and has the dramatic presence to hold it together." Film critic Roger Ebert suggested that Beloved was not a genre ghost story but the supernatural was used to explore deeper issues and the non-linear structure of Morrison's story had a purpose.

In 1996, television talk-show host Oprah Winfrey selected Song of Solomon for her newly launched Book Club, which became a popular feature on her Oprah Winfrey Show. An average of 13 million viewers watched the show's book club segments. As a result, when Winfrey selected Morrison's earliest novel The Bluest Eye in 2000, it sold another 800,000 paperback copies. John Young wrote in the African American Review in 2001 that Morrison's career experienced the boost of "The Oprah Effect, ... enabling Morrison to reach a broad, popular audience."

Winfrey selected a total of four of Morrison's novels over six years, giving Morrison's works a bigger sales boost than they received from her Nobel Prize win in 1993. The novelist also appeared three times on Winfrey's show. Winfrey said, "For all those who asked the question 'Toni Morrison again?'... I say with certainty there would have been no Oprah's Book Club if this woman had not chosen to share her love of words with the world." Morrison called the book club a "reading revolution".

=== Early 21st century ===
Morrison continued to explore different art forms, such as providing texts for original scores of classical music. She collaborated with André Previn on the song cycle Honey and Rue, which premiered with Kathleen Battle in January 1992, and on Four Songs, premiered at Carnegie Hall with Sylvia McNair in November 1994. Both Sweet Talk: Four Songs on Text and Spirits In the Well (1997) were written for Jessye Norman with music by Richard Danielpour, and, alongside Maya Angelou and Clarissa Pinkola Estés, Morrison provided the text for composer Judith Weir's woman.life.song commissioned by Carnegie Hall for Jessye Norman, which premiered in April 2000.

Morrison returned to Margaret Garner's life story, the basis of her novel Beloved, to write the libretto for a new opera, Margaret Garner. Completed in 2002, with music by Richard Danielpour, the opera was premièred on May 7, 2005, at the Detroit Opera House with Denyce Graves in the title role. Love, Morrison's first novel since Paradise, came out in 2003. In 2004, she put together a children's book called Remember to mark the 50th anniversary of the Brown v. Board of Education Supreme Court decision in 1954 that declared racially segregated public schools to be unconstitutional.

From 1997 to 2003, Morrison was an Andrew D. White Professor-at-Large at Cornell University.

In 2004, Morrison was invited by Wellesley College to deliver the commencement address, which has been described as "among the greatest commencement addresses of all time and a courageous counterpoint to the entire genre".

In June 2005, the University of Oxford awarded Morrison an honorary Doctor of Letters degree.

In the spring 2006, The New York Times Book Review named Beloved the best work of American fiction published in the previous 25 years, as chosen by a selection of prominent writers, literary critics, and editors. In his essay about the choice, "In Search of the Best", critic A. O. Scott said: "Any other outcome would have been startling since Morrison's novel has inserted itself into the American canon more completely than any of its potential rivals. With remarkable speed, 'Beloved' has, less than 20 years after its publication, become a staple of the college literary curriculum, which is to say a classic. This triumph is commensurate with its ambition since it was Morrison's intention in writing it precisely to expand the range of classic American literature, to enter, as a living Black woman, the company of dead White males like Faulkner, Melville, Hawthorne and Twain."

In November 2006, Morrison visited the Louvre museum in Paris as the second in its "Grand Invité" program to guest-curate a month-long series of events across the arts on the theme of "The Foreigner's Home", about which The New York Times said: "In tapping her own African-American culture, Ms. Morrison is eager to credit 'foreigners' with enriching the countries where they settle."

Morrison's novel A Mercy, released in 2008, is set in the Virginia colonies of 1682. Diane Johnson, in her review in Vanity Fair, called A Mercy "a poetic, visionary, mesmerizing tale that captures, in the cradle of our present problems and strains, the natal curse put on us back then by the Indian tribes, Africans, Dutch, Portuguese, and English competing to get their footing in the New World against a hostile landscape and the essentially tragic nature of human experience."

=== Princeton years ===
From 1989 until her retirement in 2006, Morrison held the Robert F. Goheen Chair in the Humanities at Princeton University. She said she did not think much of modern fiction writers who reference their own lives instead of inventing new material, and she used to tell her creative writing students, "I don't want to hear about your little life, OK?" Practicing what she preached, she chose not to write about her own life in a memoir or autobiography.

Though based in the Creative Writing Program at Princeton, Morrison did not regularly offer writing workshops to students after the late 1990s, a fact that earned her some criticism. Rather, she conceived and developed the Princeton Atelier, a program that brings together students with writers and performing artists. Together the students and the artists produce works of art that are presented to the public after a semester of collaboration.

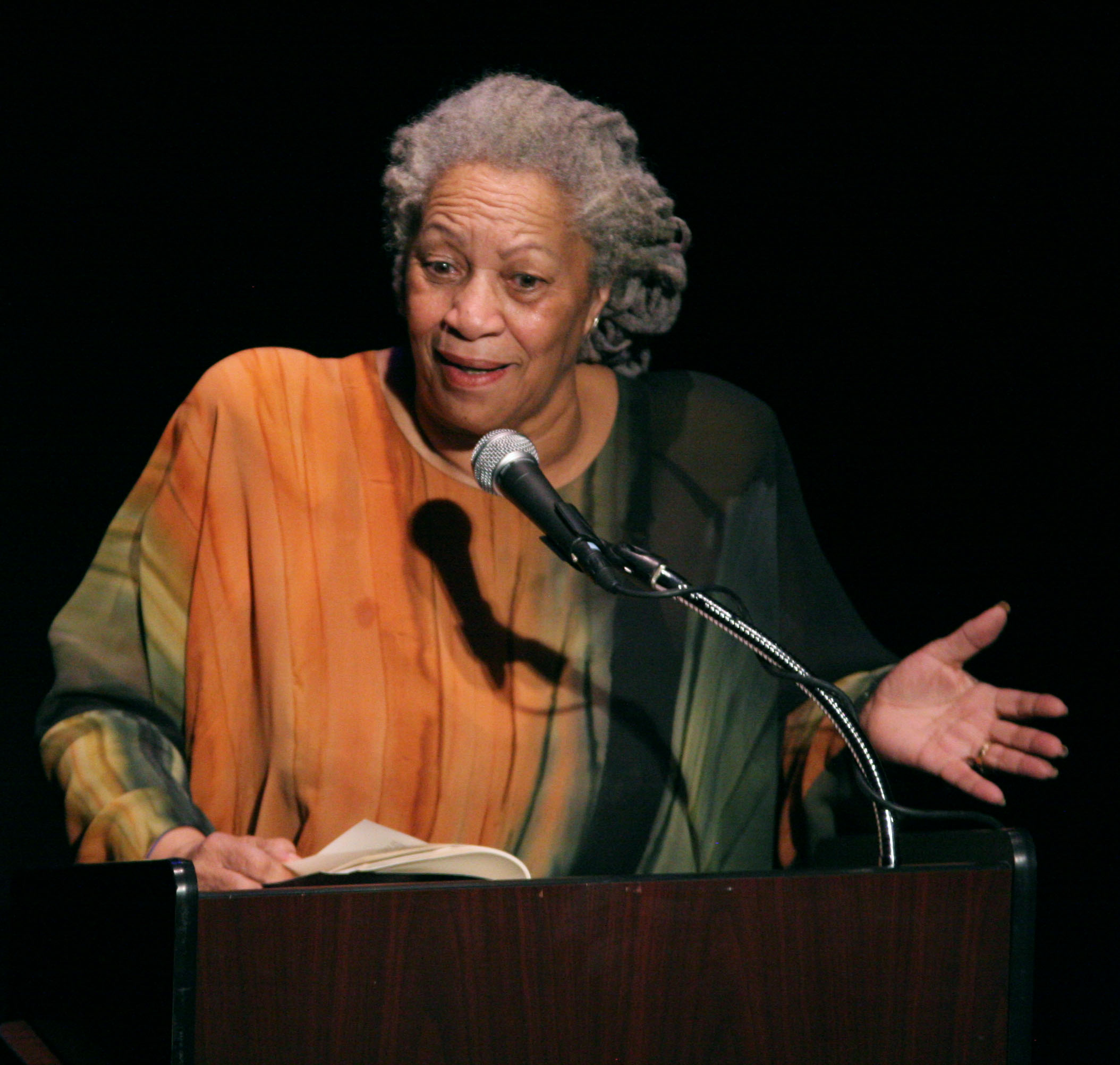
Morrison speaking in 2008

Inspired by her curatorship at the Louvre Museum, Morrison returned to Princeton in the fall 2008 to lead a small seminar, also entitled "The Foreigner's Home".

On November 17, 2017, Princeton University dedicated Morrison Hall (a building previously called West College) in her honor.

=== Final years: 2010–2019 ===
In May 2010, Morrison appeared at PEN World Voices for a conversation with Marlene van Niekerk and Kwame Anthony Appiah about South African literature and specifically van Niekerk's 2004 novel Agaat.

Morrison wrote books for children with her younger son, Slade Morrison, who was a painter and a musician. Slade died of pancreatic cancer on December 22, 2010, aged 45, when Morrison's novel Home (2012) was half-completed.

In May 2011, Morrison received an Honorary Doctor of Letters degree from Rutgers University–New Brunswick. During the commencement ceremony, she delivered a speech on the "pursuit of life, liberty, meaningfulness, integrity, and truth".

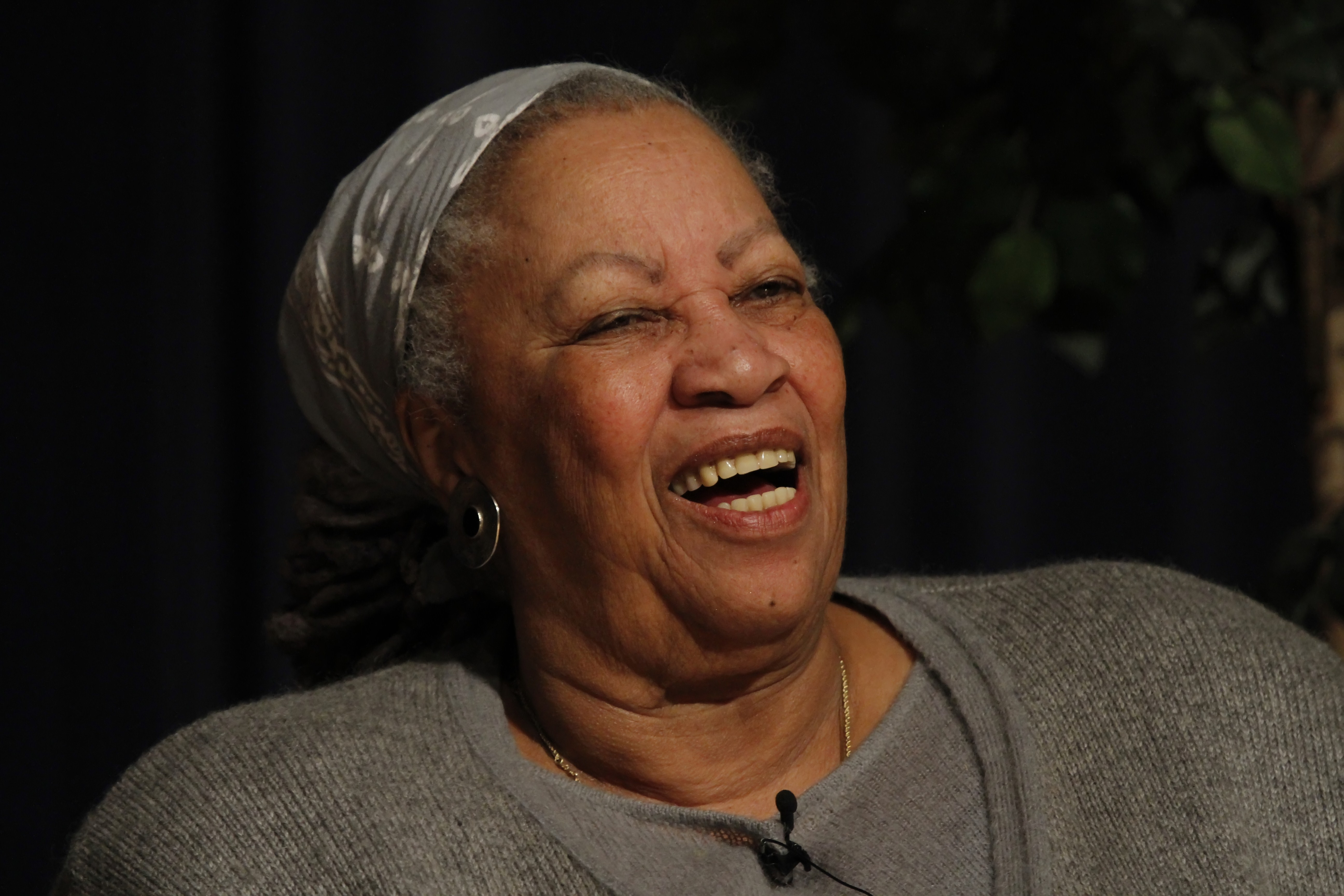
Morrison in 2013

In 2011, Morrison worked with opera director Peter Sellars and Malian singer-songwriter Rokia Traoré on Desdemona, taking a fresh look at William Shakespeare's tragedy Othello. The trio focused on the relationship between Othello's wife Desdemona and her African nursemaid, Barbary, who is only briefly referenced in Shakespeare. The play, a mix of words, music and song, premiered in Vienna in 2011.

Morrison had stopped working on her latest novel when her son died in 2010, later explaining, "I stopped writing until I began to think, He would be really put out if he thought that he had caused me to stop. 'Please, Mom, I'm dead, could you keep going ...?'"

She completed Home and dedicated it to her son Slade. Published in 2012, it is the story of a Korean War veteran in the segregated United States of the 1950s who tries to save his sister from brutal medical experiments at the hands of a white doctor.

In August 2012, Oberlin College became the home base of the Toni Morrison Society, an international literary society founded in 1993, dedicated to scholarly research of Morrison's work.

Morrison's eleventh novel, God Help the Child, was published in 2015. It follows Bride, an executive in the fashion and beauty industry whose mother tormented her as a child for being dark-skinned, a trauma that has continued to dog Bride.

Morrison was a member of the editorial advisory board of The Nation, a magazine started in 1865 by Northern abolitionists.

== Personal life ==
While teaching at Howard University from 1957 to 1964, she met Harold Morrison, a Jamaican architect, whom she married in 1958. She took his last name, and became known as Toni Morrison. Their first son, Harold Ford, was born in 1961. She was pregnant when she and Harold divorced in 1964.

Her second son, Slade Kevin Morrison, was born in 1965; he died of pancreatic cancer on December 22, 2010, when Morrison was halfway through writing her novel Home. She stopped work on the novel for a number of months before completing it; it was published in 2012.

== Death ==
Morrison died at Montefiore Medical Center in The Bronx, New York City, on August 5, 2019, at the age of 88, from complications of pneumonia.

Following the announcement of her death, tributes were widely paid, including by Clara Farmer, publishing director of Chatto & Windus, Morrison's UK publisher, who said: "Toni Morrison changed the way a book could be written and opened doors to others with her provocation that 'if there's a book you want to read, but it hasn't been written yet, then you must write it'."

A memorial tribute was held on November 21, 2019, at the Cathedral of St. John the Divine in the Morningside Heights neighborhood of Manhattan in New York City. Morrison was eulogized by, among others, Oprah Winfrey, Angela Davis, Michael Ondaatje, David Remnick, Fran Lebowitz, Ta-Nehisi Coates, and Edwidge Danticat. The jazz saxophonist David Murray performed a musical tribute.

== Politics, literary reception, and legacy ==
=== Politics ===
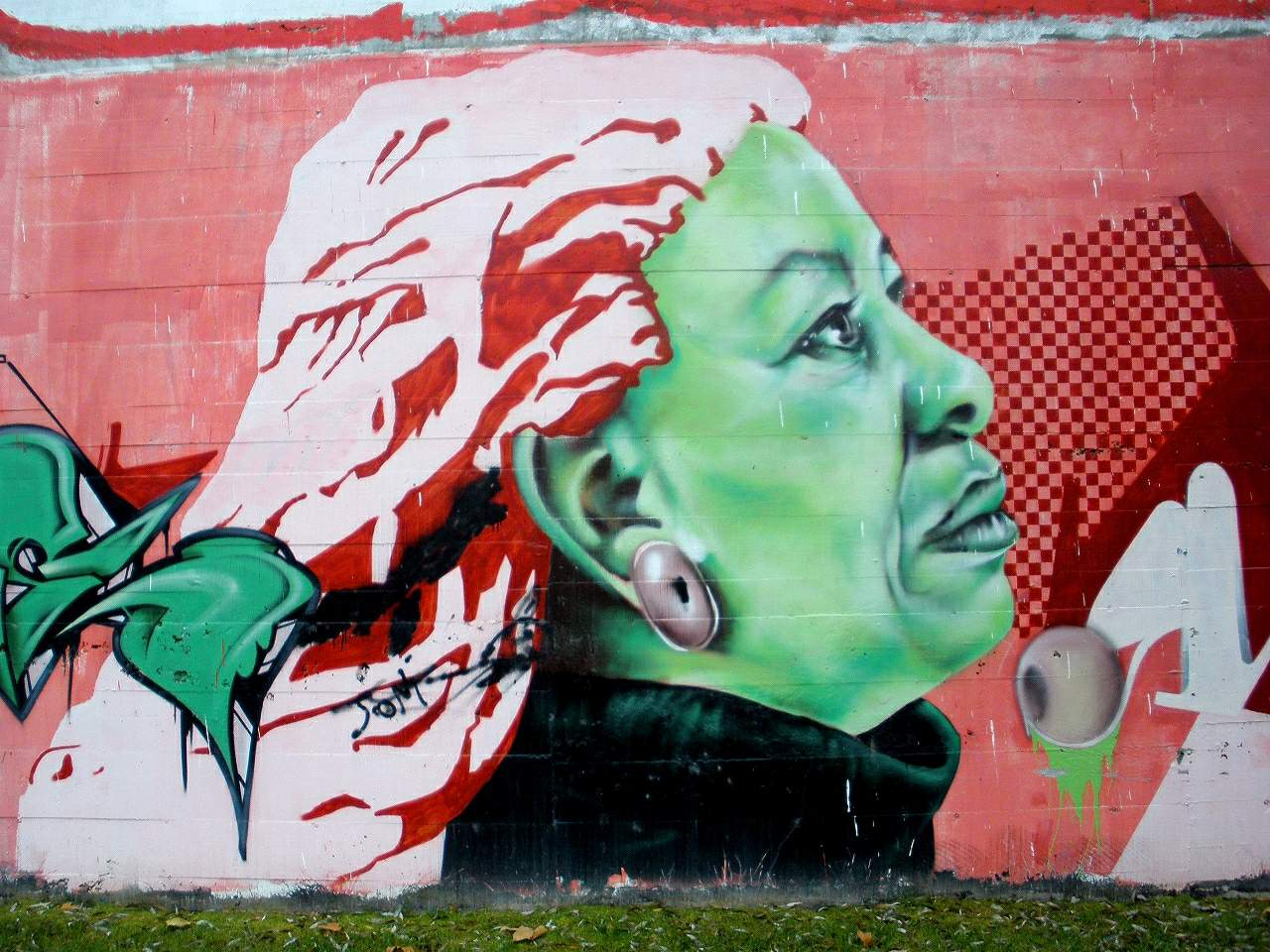
Street art depicting Morrison in Vitoria, Spain

Morrison spoke openly about American politics and race relations.

In writing about the 1998 impeachment of Bill Clinton, she claimed that since Whitewater, Bill Clinton was being mistreated in the same way Black people often are:

Years ago, in the middle of the Whitewater investigation, one heard the first murmurs: white skin notwithstanding, this is our first black President. Blacker than any actual black person who could ever be elected in our children's lifetime. After all, Clinton displays almost every trope of blackness: single-parent household, born poor, working-class, saxophone-playing, McDonald's-and-junk-food-loving boy from Arkansas.

The phrase "our first Black president" was adopted as a positive by Bill Clinton supporters. When the Congressional Black Caucus honored the former president at its dinner in Washington, D.C., on September 29, 2001, for instance, Rep. Eddie Bernice Johnson (D-TX), the chair, told the audience that Clinton "took so many initiatives he made us think for a while we had elected the first black president".

In the context of the 2008 Democratic Primary campaign, Morrison stated to Time magazine: "People misunderstood that phrase. I was deploring the way in which President Clinton was being treated, vis-à-vis the sex scandal that was surrounding him. I said he was being treated like a black on the street, already guilty, already a perp. I have no idea what his real instincts are, in terms of race." In the Democratic primary contest for the 2008 presidential race, Morrison endorsed Senator Barack Obama over Senator Hillary Clinton, though expressing admiration and respect for the latter. When he won, Morrison said she felt like an American for the first time. She said, "I felt very powerfully patriotic when I went to the inauguration of Barack Obama. I felt like a kid."

In April 2015, speaking of the deaths of Michael Brown, Eric Garner and Walter Scott – three unarmed Black men killed by white police officers – Morrison said: "People keep saying, 'We need to have a conversation about race.' This is the conversation. I want to see a cop shoot a white unarmed teenager in the back. And I want to see a white man convicted for raping a Black woman. Then when you ask me, 'Is it over?', I will say yes."

After the 2016 election of Donald Trump as President of the United States, Morrison wrote an essay, "Mourning for Whiteness", published in the November 21, 2016, issue of The New Yorker. In it she argues that white Americans are so afraid of losing privileges afforded them by their race that white voters elected Trump, whom she described as being "endorsed by the Ku Klux Klan", in order to keep the idea of white supremacy alive.

=== Relationship to feminism ===
Although her novels typically concentrate on black women, Morrison did not identify her works as feminist. When asked in a 1998 interview, "Why distance oneself from feminism?" she replied: "In order to be as free as I possibly can, in my own imagination, I can't take positions that are closed. Everything I've ever done, in the writing world, has been to expand articulation, rather than to close it, to open doors, sometimes, not even closing the book – leaving the endings open for reinterpretation, revisitation, a little ambiguity." She went on to state that she thought it "off-putting to some readers, who may feel that I'm involved in writing some kind of feminist tract. I don't subscribe to patriarchy, and I don't think it should be substituted with matriarchy. I think it's a question of equitable access, and opening doors to all sorts of things."

In 2012, she responded to a question about the difference between black and white feminists in the 1970s. "Womanists is what black feminists used to call themselves", she explained. "They were not the same thing. And also the relationship with men. Historically, black women have always sheltered their men because they were out there, and they were the ones that were most likely to be killed."

W. S. Kottiswari writes in Postmodern Feminist Writers (2008) that Morrison exemplifies characteristics of "postmodern feminism" by "altering Euro-American dichotomies by rewriting a history written by mainstream historians" and by her usage of shifting narration in Beloved and Paradise. Kottiswari states: "Instead of western logocentric abstractions, Morrison prefers the powerful vivid language of women of color ... She is essentially postmodern since her approach to myth and folklore is re-visionist."

=== Contributions to Black feminism ===
Many of Morrison's works have been cited by scholars as significant contributions to Black feminism, reflecting themes of race, gender, and sexual identity within her narratives.

Barbara Smith's 1977 essay "Toward a Black Feminist Criticism" argues that Morrison's Sula is a work of Black feminism, as it presents a lesbian perspective that challenges heterosexual relationships and the conventional family unit. Smith states, "Consciously or not, Morrison's work poses both lesbian and feminist questions about Black women's autonomy and their impact upon each other's lives."

Hilton Als's 2003 profile in The New Yorker notes that "Before the late sixties, there was no real Black Studies curriculum in the academy—let alone a post-colonial-studies program or a feminist one. As an editor and author, Morrison, backed by the institutional power of Random House, provided the material for those discussions to begin."

Morrison consistently advocated for feminist ideas that challenge the dominance of the white patriarchal system, frequently rejecting the notion of writing from the perspective of the "white male gaze". Feminist political activist Angela Davis notes that "Toni Morrison's project resides precisely in the effort to discredit the notion that this white male gaze must be omnipresent."

In a 1998 episode of Charlie Rose, Morrison responded to a review of Sula, stating, "I remember a review of Sula in which the reviewer said, 'One day, she', meaning me, 'will have to face up 'to the real responsibilities, and get mature, 'and write about the real confrontation 'for black people, which is white people.' As though our lives have no meaning and no depth without the white gaze, and I have spent my entire writing life trying to make sure that the white gaze was not the dominant one in any of my books."

In a 2015 interview with The New York Times Magazine, Morrison reiterated her intention to write without the white gaze, stating, "What I'm interested in is writing without the gaze, without the white gaze. In so many earlier books by African-American writers, particularly the men, I felt that they were not writing to me. But what interested me was the African-American experience throughout whichever time I spoke of. It was always about African-American culture and people – good, bad, indifferent, whatever – but that was, for me, the universe."

Regarding the racial environment in which she wrote, Morrison stated, "Navigating a white male world was not threatening. It wasn't even interesting. I was more interesting than they were. I knew more than they did. And I wasn't afraid to show it."

In a 1986 interview with Sandi Russell, Morrison stated that she wrote primarily for Black women, explaining, "I write for black women. We are not addressing the men, as some white female writers do. We are not attacking each other, as both black and white men do. Black women writers look at things in an unforgiving/loving way. They are writing to repossess, re-name, re-own."

In a 2003 interview, when asked about the labels "black" and "female" being attached to her work, Morrison replied, "I can accept the labels because being a black woman writer is not a shallow place but a rich place to write from. It doesn't limit my imagination; it expands it. It's richer than being a white male writer because I know more and I've experienced more."

In a 1987 article in The New York Times, Morrison argued for the greatness of being a Black woman, stating, "I really think the range of emotions and perceptions I have had access to as a black person and as a female person are greater than those of people who are neither. I really do. So it seems to me that my world did not shrink because I was a black female writer. It just got bigger."

Zadie Smith, paying tribute to "this infinite terrain" that Morrison opened up to her as a young black woman, wrote in 2019: "Morrison rejected the very concept of the narrow door and claimed for herself the wide world. She enriched our literary inheritance, and now every school child, whatever their background, can inherit Morrison as a literary forebear, a great American writer, who is as available to them—as 'universal'—as any other writer in the canon. All readers and writers are indebted to her for the space she created."

=== Papers ===
The Toni Morrison Papers are part of the permanent library collections of Princeton University, where they are held in the Manuscripts Division, Department of Rare Books and Special Collections. Morrison's decision to offer her papers to Princeton instead of to her alma mater Howard University was criticized by some within the historically black colleges and universities community.

Opening in February 2023, an exhibition titled Toni Morrison: Sites of Memory, which was curated from her archives at Princeton University, commemorated the 30th anniversary of her winning the Nobel Prize. Running from the week after her birthday until June 4, the exhibition featured rare manuscripts, correspondence between Morrison and others, and unfinished projects, taking its name from a 1995 essay by Morrison in which she spoke of a "journey to a site to see what remains were left behind and to reconstruct the world that these remains imply".

=== Day, halls, and school ===
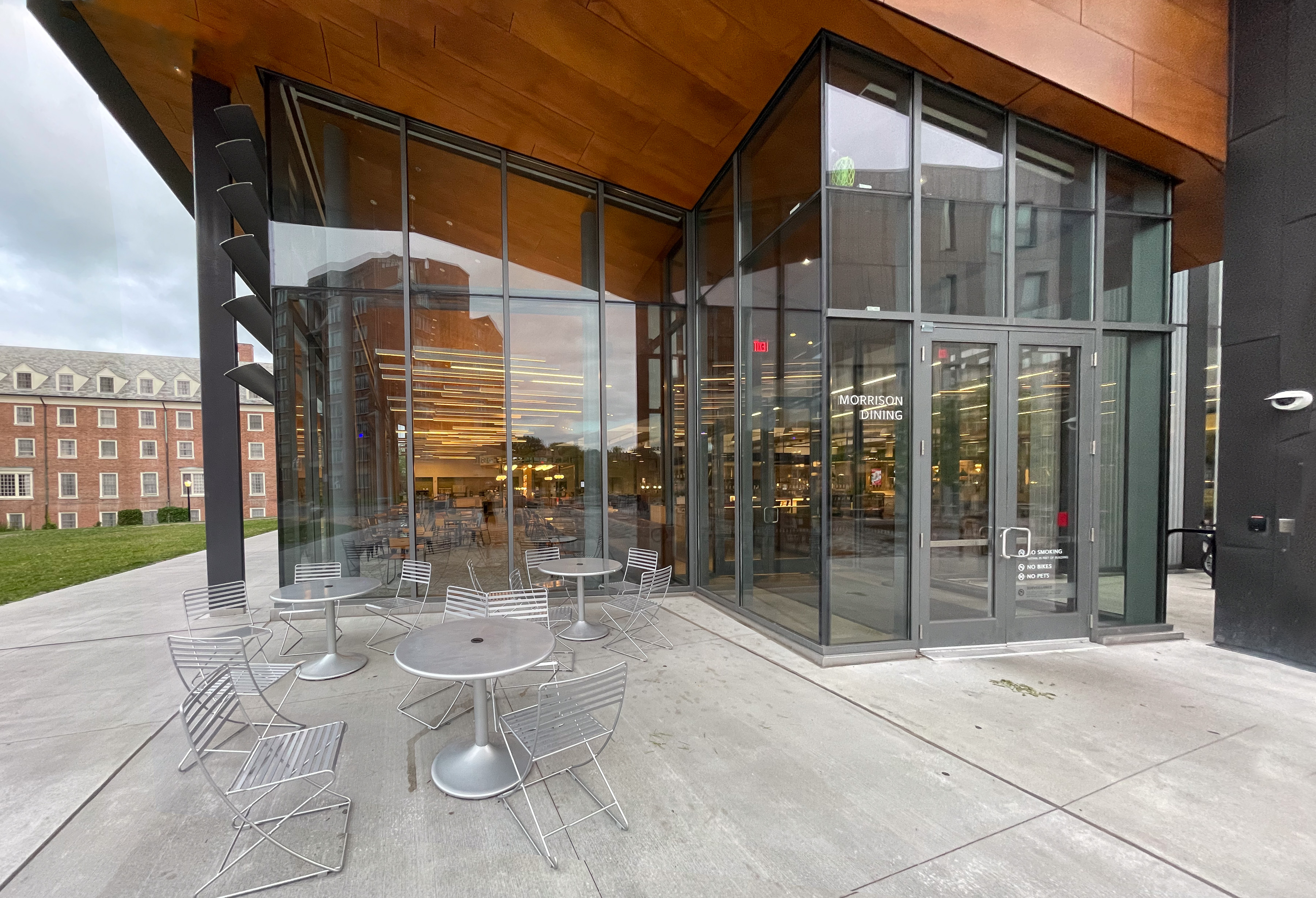
Morrison Dining

In 2007, Toni Morrison Elementary School opened in her hometown of Lorain, Ohio. In 2019, a resolution was passed in her hometown of Lorain, Ohio, to designate February 18, her birthday, as Toni Morrison Day. Additional legislation was introduced to also proclaim that date throughout the State of Ohio. The legislation, HB 325, was passed by the Ohio House of Representatives on December 2, 2020, and signed into law by Governor Mike DeWine on December 21.

In 2021, Cornell University opened Toni Morrison Hall, a 178,869 square-foot residence hall alongside an adjacent dining hall in 2022 named Morrison Dining.

During December 2023, to celebrate the 30th anniversary of Morrison's Nobel win, the Toni Morrison Collective at Cornell University partnered with Calvary Baptist Church to give away free copies of two of Morrison's books and hold book talks in various locations. As explained by Anne V. Adams, professor emerita of Africana studies and comparative literature and chair of the Toni Morrison Collective: "The fact that Toni Morrison, during her first year as a master's student, lodged at a house just a couple of doors up the street from historic Calvary Baptist Church created a perfect context for a collaboration."

== Documentary films ==
Morrison was interviewed by Margaret Busby in London for a 1988 documentary film by Sindamani Bridglal, entitled Identifiable Qualities, shown on Channel 4.

Morrison was the subject of a film titled Imagine – Toni Morrison Remembers, directed by Jill Nicholls and shown on BBC One television on July 15, 2015, in which Morrison talked to Alan Yentob about her life and work.

In 2016, Oberlin College received a grant to complete a documentary film begun in 2014, The Foreigner's Home, about Morrison's intellectual and artistic vision, explored in the context of the 2006 exhibition she guest-curated at the Louvre. The film's executive producer was Jonathan Demme. It was directed by Oberlin College Cinema Studies faculty Geoff Pingree and Rian Brown, and incorporates footage shot by Morrison's first-born son Harold Ford Morrison, who also consulted on the film.

In 2019, Timothy Greenfield-Sanders' documentary Toni Morrison: The Pieces I Am premiered at the Sundance Film Festival. Those featured in the film include Morrison, Angela Davis, Oprah Winfrey, Fran Lebowitz, Sonia Sanchez, and Walter Mosley, among others.

== Awards ==
- 1975: Ohioana Book Award for Sula
- 1977: National Book Critics Circle Award for Song of Solomon
- 1977: American Academy and Institute of Arts and Letters Award
- 1981: Langston Hughes Medal, City College of New York
- 1982: Ohio Women's Hall of Fame inductee
- 1986: New York State Governor's Arts Award
- 1988: Robert F. Kennedy Book Award
- 1988: Helmerich Award
- 1988: American Book Award for Beloved
- 1988: Anisfield-Wolf Book Award in Race Relations for Beloved
- 1988: Pulitzer Prize for Fiction for Beloved
- 1988: Frederic G. Melcher Book Award for Beloved (Note: A remark in her acceptance speech that "there is no suitable memorial or plaque or wreath or wall or park or skyscraper lobby" honoring the memory of the human beings forced into slavery and brought to the United States – "There's no small bench by the road" – led the Toni Morrison Society to begin installing benches at significant sites in the history of slavery in America; the first "bench by the road" was dedicated July 26, 2008, on Sullivan's Island, South Carolina, the point of entry for about 40 percent of the enslaved Africans brought to Colonial America.)
- 1988: Honorary Doctor of Laws at University of Pennsylvania
- 1989: Honorary Doctor of Letters at Harvard University
- 1993: Nobel Prize in Literature
- 1993: Commander of the Arts and Letters, Paris
- 1994: Condorcet Medal, Paris
- 1994: Rhegium Julii Prize for Literature
- 1995: Honorary Doctorate of Letters from Howard University
- 1996: Jefferson Lecture
- 1996: National Book Foundation's Medal of Distinguished Contribution to American Letters
- 1997: Honorary Doctorate of Humane Letters from Gustavus Adolphus College.
- 1998: Audie Award for Narration by the Author for Sula
- 2000: National Humanities Medal
- 2001: Pell Award for Lifetime Achievement in the Arts
- 2002: 100 Greatest African Americans, list by Molefi Kete Asante
- 2005: Golden Plate Award of the American Academy of Achievement
- 2005: Honorary Doctorate of Letters from the University of Oxford
- 2005: Coretta Scott King Award for Remember: The Journey to School Integration
- 2006: Beloved chosen as one of the best works of American Fiction in the last 25 years by the New York Times.
- 2007: Ellie Charles Artist Award from African Voices at Columbia University.
- 2008: New Jersey Hall of Fame inductee
- 2009: Norman Mailer Prize, Lifetime Achievement
- 2010: Officier de la Légion d'Honneur
- 2010: Institute for Arts and Humanities Medal for Distinguished Contributions to the Arts and Humanities from the Pennsylvania State University
- 2011: Library of Congress Creative Achievement Award for Fiction
- 2011: Honorary Doctor of Letters at Rutgers University Graduation Commencement
- 2011: Honorary Doctorate of Letters from the University of Geneva
- 2012: Presidential Medal of Freedom
- 2013: The Nichols-Chancellor's Medal awarded by Vanderbilt University
- 2013: Honorary Doctorate of Literature awarded by Princeton University
- 2013: PEN Oakland – Josephine Miles Literary Award for Home
- 2013: Writer in Residence at the American Academy in Rome
- 2014: Ivan Sandrof Lifetime Achievement Award given by the National Book Critics Circle
- 2016: PEN/Saul Bellow Award for Achievement in American Fiction
- 2016: The Charles Eliot Norton Professorship in Poetry (The Norton Lectures), Harvard University
- 2016: The Edward MacDowell Medal, awarded by the MacDowell Colony
- 2018: The Thomas Jefferson Medal, awarded by The American Philosophical Society
- 2019: In 2019, Time created 89 new covers to celebrate women of the year starting from 1920; it chose Morrison for 1993.
- 2020: National Women's Hall of Fame inductee
- 2020: Designation of "Toni Morrison Day" in Ohio, to be celebrated annually on her birthday, February 18
- 2021: Featured on "Cleveland is the Reason" mural in downtown Cleveland (with other notable Cleveland area figures)
- 2023: Featured on a USPS Forever stamp, designed by art director Ethel Kessler with photography by Deborah Feingold

=== Nomination ===
Who's Got Game? The Ant or the Grasshopper? The Lion or the Mouse? Poppy or the Snake? was a Grammy Award for Best Spoken Word Album for Children nominee in 2008.

== Works ==
=== Novels ===
- The Bluest Eye. Knopf. 1970. ISBN 0452287065.
- Sula. Knopf Doubleday Publishing. 1973. ISBN 140003343-8.
- Song of Solomon. Knopf Doubleday Publishing. 1977. ISBN 140003342X.
- Tar Baby. Knopf Doubleday Publishing. 1981. ISBN 1400033446.
- Beloved. Knopf. 1987. ISBN 1400033411.
- Jazz. Knopf Doubleday Publishing. 1992. ISBN 1400076218.
- Paradise. Knopf. 1998. ISBN 0679433740.
- Love. Knopf. 2003. ISBN 0375409440.
- A Mercy. Knopf. 2008. ISBN 978-0307264237.
- Home. Knopf. 2012. ISBN 978-0307594167.
- God Help the Child. Knopf. 2015. ISBN 978-0307594174.
  - Excerpt titled "Sweetness" published in The New Yorker, February 2, 2015.

=== Children's books (with Slade Morrison) ===
- The Big Box (1999). ISBN 978-0786823642.
- The Book of Mean People (2002). ISBN 978-0786805402.
- Who's Got Game? The Ant or the Grasshopper?, The Lion or the Mouse?, Poppy or the Snake? (2007). ISBN 978-0743283915.
- Peeny Butter Fudge (2009). ISBN 978-1442459007.
- Little Cloud and Lady Wind (2010). ISBN 1416985239.
- Please, Louise (2014). ISBN 978-1416983385.
- A Toni Morrison Treasury: The Big Box; The Ant or the Grasshopper?; The Lion or the Mouse?; Poppy or the Snake?; Peeny Butter Fudge; The Tortoise or the Hare; Little Cloud and Lady Wind; Please, Louise (2023). ISBN 9781665915540.

=== Children's books (solo) ===
- Remember: The Journey to School Integration (2004). ISBN 978-0618397402

=== Short fiction ===
- "Recitatif", in Amiri Baraka and Amina Baraka (eds), Confirmation: An Anthology of African American Women (1983). A standalone hardback edition of the short story, with an introduction by Zadie Smith, was published in February 2022 (US: Knopf; UK: Chatto & Windus).

=== Plays ===
- N'Orleans: The Storyville Musical (aka New Orleans) (performed 1982) with Donald McKayle
- Dreaming Emmett (performed 1986)
- Desdemona (first performed May 15, 2011, in Vienna)

=== Poetry ===
- Five Poems (2002, limited edition book with illustrations by Kara Walker)

=== Libretto ===
- Margaret Garner (first performed May 2005)

=== Non-fiction ===
- Foreword, The Black Photographers Annual Volume 1, edited by Joe Crawford (1973), OCLC 1783715
- Foreword and Preface, The Black Book edited by Harris, Levitt, Furman and Smith. Random House (1974), ISBN 978-1400068487
- Foreword, Race-ing Justice, En-gendering Power: Essays on Anita Hill, Clarence Thomas, and the Construction of Social Reality. Pantheon Books (1992), ISBN 978-0679741459
- Co-editor, Birth of a Nation'hood: Gaze, Script, and Spectacle in the O.J. Simpson Case (1997), ISBN 978-0307482266
- Playing in the Dark: Whiteness and the Literary Imagination (1992, 2007), ISBN 978-0307388636
- What Moves at the Margin: Selected Nonfiction, edited by Carolyn C. Denard (2008), ISBN 978-1604730173
- Editor, Burn This Book: PEN Writers Speak Out on the Power of the Word (2009), ISBN 978-0061878817
- The Origin of Others – The Charles Eliot Norton Lectures, Harvard University Press (2017), ISBN 978-0674976450
- Goodness and the Literary Imagination: Harvard Divinity School's 95th Ingersoll Lecture: With Essays on Morrison's Moral and Religious Vision. Edited by David Carrasco, Stephanie Paulsell, and Mara Willard. Charlottesville: University of Virginia Press (2019)
- The Source of Self-Regard: Selected Essays, Speeches, and Meditations. New York: Alfred A. Knopf (2019), ISBN 978-0525521037. UK edition published as Mouth Full of Blood: Essays, Speeches, Meditations, London: Chatto & Windus (2019), ISBN 978-1784742850
- Language as Liberation: Reflections on the American Canon, Knopf (2026), ISBN 978-0-593-80274-8

=== Articles ===
- "Introduction." Mark Twain, Adventures of Huckleberry Finn. [1885] The Oxford Mark Twain, edited by Shelley Fisher Fishkin. New York: Oxford University Press, 1996, pp. xxxii–xli.

== See also ==
- American literature
- African-American literature
- List of American Nobel laureates
- List of black Nobel laureates
- List of female Nobel laureates
