= Recitatif =

1983 short story by Toni Morrison

- Short story by Toni Morrison
- Country: United States
- Language: English
- Genres: Short story, fiction

Publication
- Published in: Confirmation: An Anthology of African American Women
- Publication type: Book
- Publisher: Morrow
- Publication date: 1983

"Recitatif" is a short story by American author Toni Morrison. It was initially published in 1983 in Confirmation: An Anthology of African American Women, an anthology edited by Amiri Baraka and Amina Baraka. The story was reissued as a stand-alone book, published in February 2022.

"Recitatif" is a story in racial writing, as the race of Twyla and Roberta are debatable. Though the characters are clearly separated by class, neither is affirmed as African-American or White. Morrison has described the story as "the removal of all racial codes from a narrative about two characters of different races for whom racial identity is crucial".

== Historical context ==
=== The name ===
Récitatif is the French form of recitative, a style of musical declamation that hovers between song and ordinary speech, particularly used for dialogic and narrative interludes during operas and oratories. An obsolete sense of the term was also "the tone or rhythm peculiar to any language". Both of these definitions suggest the story's episodic nature. Each of the story's five sections happens in a register that is different from the respective ordinary lives of its two central characters, Roberta and Twyla. The story's vignettes bring together the rhythms of the two main characters', Roberta and Twyla, lives for five, short moments, all of them narrated in Twyla's voice. The story is, then, in several ways, Twyla's "Recitatif".

=== The story ===
"Recitatif" is set in three different time periods, in which racial tensions and African-American progressive movements peaked, contributing to a shift in culture in the United States. The beginning of the story took place in the 1950s, when Twyla and Roberta first met as eight-year-olds. This time period is most notable as the Jim Crow segregation era and the period in which the Civil Rights Movement was launched. Also, during this period, the Supreme Court delivered the ruling of the case of Brown vs. Board of Education, which effectively outlawed racial segregation in learning institutions. As a result, protests erupted throughout the country in response to African-American students enrolling in previously segregated schools.

The next part of the story is set in the 1960s. During this time, the Civil Rights Movement gained momentum as the Civil Rights Act of 1964 was passed the United States federal government, outlawing discrimination based on race, religion, sex, and nationality. Four years later, civil rights leader, Dr. Martin Luther King, Jr. was assassinated, leading to the expansion of the Civil Rights Movement, and ultimately, an extensive culture shift in the United States as prejudicial social standards were increasingly rejected and progressive politics were increasingly embraced. The last part of the story is set in the early 1980s, which marked the beginning of Ronald Reagan's presidency. During Reagan's presidency, issues of race and prejudice were inflamed contributing to ongoing racial and social tensions.

Morrison's short story was greatly influenced and shaped by these critical historical movements as they affected and determined the plot of the story and the relationship between Twyla and Roberta, the main characters of the story.

"Recitatif" began as a screenplay that Morrison was enlisted to write as a costarring vehicle for Marlo Thomas and Cicely Tyson, who both passed on the project after expressing dissatisfaction with Morrison's script.

== Plot summary ==
"Recitatif" is told from the perspective of Twyla in the 1960s, during a period of her childhood when her mother was not able to properly take care of her. She spent a portion at an orphanage where she met Roberta, a girl of a different race. They became friends during their time at St. Bonny's, although it was obvious to them both that they were different. In the short story, Morrison illustrates the theme of race and prejudice by using racial ambiguity through the interactions between two racially unidentified, but characteristically similar girls to highlight the racial barrier and tensions prevalent at that time.

=== First encounter ===
Twyla and Roberta first meet within the confines of an orphanage for children, St. Bonny's (named after St. Bonaventure), because each has been taken away from her mother. Roberta's mother is ill and Twyla's mother "just likes to dance all night." We learn immediately that the girls look different from one another as one is black, one is white, although we are not told which is which. Despite their initially hostile feelings, they are drawn together because of their similar circumstances.

The two girls turn out to be "more alike than unalike" as they were both "dumped" at the orphanage. They become allies against the "big girls on the second floor", whom they call "gar-girls" (a name they get from mishearing the word "gargoyle"), as well as against the home's "real orphans", the children whose parents have died. They share a fascination with Maggie, the old, sandy-colored woman "with legs like parentheses" who works in the home's kitchen and is unable to speak.

Twyla and Roberta are reminded of their differences on the Sunday that each of their mothers comes to visit and attend church with them. Twyla's mother, Mary, is dressed inappropriately, while Roberta's mother is wearing an enormous cross on her chest. Mary offers her hand, but Roberta's mother refuses to shake Mary's hand and Mary begins cursing. Twyla experiences humiliation as her mother's inappropriate behavior shames her, and she feels slighted by Roberta's mother's refusal.

After four months together, Roberta leaves the orphanage.

=== Second encounter ===
Twyla and Roberta meet again eight years later during the late 1960s, when Twyla is "working behind the counter at the Howard Johnson's on the Thruway" and Roberta is sitting in a booth with "two guys smothered in head and facial hair." Roberta and her friends are on their way to the west coast to keep an appointment with Jimi Hendrix. This encounter is brief but long enough for the two to show resentment towards each other. Roberta seems dismissive of Twyla and Twyla feels slighted for being told off by Roberta.

=== Third encounter ===
The third time Twyla and Roberta meet is 12 years after the second encounter. They are both married and meet while shopping at the Food Emporium, a new gourmet grocery store. Twyla describes the encounter as a complete opposite of their last. They get along well and share memories of the past. Roberta is rich and Twyla is lower-middle-class. Twyla is married to a firefighter and they have a son and Roberta is married to an IBM executive, a widower with four children who has a blue limousine and two servants. Twyla learns that Roberta returned to the orphanage two more times and then she ran away. She also finds out that she might have some suppressed memories about what really happened at the orphanage. She finds it hard to reconcile that her recollections may have been different from what actually transpired in reality.

=== Fourth encounter ===
The next time the two women meet, "racial strife" threatens Twyla's town of Newburgh, NY, in the form of busing. As she drives by the school, Twyla sees Roberta there, picketing the forced integration. Twyla is briefly threatened by the other protesters, but Roberta does not come to her aid. Roberta's parting remark unsettles Twyla as she states: "Maybe I am different now, Twyla. But you're not. You're the same little state kid who kicked a poor old black lady when she was down on the ground. You kicked a black lady and you have the nerve to call me a bigot."

Twyla replies: "Maggie wasn't black." Either she does not remember that she was black, or she had never classified her sandy skin as black. Twyla decides to join the counter-picketing across the street from Roberta, where she spends a few days hoisting signs that respond directly to Roberta's sign. Twyla realizes that her signs did not make any sense to an objective observer but she used them to rebut Roberta's take on the protest.

=== Fifth encounter ===
Twyla and Roberta meet again, this time in a diner on Christmas Eve, years later, in the early 1980s. Roberta wants to discuss what she last said about Maggie. The conversation is sympathetic but ends on an unresolved note. They both end up admitting how neither of their mothers had ever recovered from their respective conditions.

== Major themes ==
=== Race and prejudice ===
Throughout the short story, Morrison manipulates the issue of race and prejudice by not explicitly stating the race of the two main characters, Twyla and Roberta. However, Morrison makes the distinction between the two characters when they first meet, noting that Roberta is of a different race from Twyla. By keeping the respective races of the girls unknown to the reader, Morrison attempts to reveal the reader's personal assumptions and prejudices about race. Morrison also manages to conceal Twyla and Roberta's races during a disagreement over school integration. Roberta lives in an affluent neighborhood that consists of executives and doctors, whereas Twyla lives in a neighborhood in which half of the population is on government assistance or welfare. In the midst of their argument, Twyla and Roberta both emphasized the arbitrary nature of racial identity and both women's generally negative views regarding the other race.

The race of another character, Maggie, who is disabled, is an important element of Toni Morrison's "Recitatif" as Roberta and Twyla confront each other, and Roberta thinks that Maggie was black while Twyla disagrees, highlighting the girls' racial stereotypes. In addition, Roberta states that Twyla kicked Maggie, who she called a "poor black lady", into a garden, displaying her racial prejudice. However, later in the story, Twyla recounts the incident as Maggie falling down, but she still feels shameful. As a result, Roberta admits that she lied about the incident because of her personal conflicts regarding Maggie's race. The ambiguity of Maggie's racial identity is a key literary component of her puzzling significance within the story as it is used to show how race and prejudice is primarily an arbitrary social construction, which exists in reality because of prejudices and racial concepts that develop in people's minds.

Roberta and Twyla's perception of race is based largely not solely on race, but on their upbringings and societal norms, which contributes to the racial tension between them. As Twyla and Roberta's mothers are also essential characters in this story, they are the primary reason why the girls were put in the orphanage and they contributed to their bonding. As children, the girls relied on the racial perception of their parents as they were not old enough to develop their own perceptions. As a result, Twyla was not friendly with Roberta, initially. However, as the story progressed, the girls came to understand that they are similar in many ways. However, Roberta's racial attitudes were developed from the way society perceives race and she used this as an excuse for the previous racial tension between her and Twyla.

Throughout the story, Toni Morrison looks into the racial differences of two girls growing up in the same setting. Although the girls encounter several racial barriers and tension, they ultimately find similarities within one another, developing their relationship beyond skin color. Morrison's layered literary work depicts the parallel, complex relationship of Roberta and Twyla while simultaneously complicating the understanding of the story by the reader to challenge their racial perceptions and stereotypes. Morrison uses racial ambiguity as well as the vague signs and traits to create Twyla and Roberta's racial identities and to show how their relationship is shaped by their racial differences. Morrison's use of specific social and historical descriptions of the girls forces readers to reevaluate how racial preconceptions and stereotypical assumptions affect the overall understanding of a literary character.

=== Disability ===
Although "Recitatif" is heavily centered on the theme of race, the theme of disability is also extensively highlighted throughout the short story. During the story, the primary disabled character, Maggie, is described as mute and possibly deaf. Maggie is also stated to have "legs like parenthesis", emphasizing a physical disability. In the story, similar to the theme of race, Morrison never explicitly states what Maggie's disability is, leaving the other characters to speculate and form their own conclusions about her. Some of the children in the orphanage believes Maggie's tongue was cut off, which would explain why she does not speak. However, Roberta and Twyla do not submit to the other children's belief as they are unsure if Maggie is deaf.

The two girls test Maggie's hearing ability by calling her derogatory and stereotypical names such as "Bow legs" and "Dummy". Ultimately, the girls feel ashamed as they later consider the possibility that Maggie may very well hear them and their offensive comments. However, this does not prevent the girls from engaging in their biases and false assumptions later in the story, Twyla questions if "there was somebody in there", referring to Maggie's body. As adults, Twyla even justifies Maggie's incident of falling at the orphanage as insignificant because she does not believe that there is a real person inside of Maggie's body, while Roberta claims that she thought Maggie was crazy because she did not talk and confesses that she wanted to hurt Maggie, emphasizing the notion that individuals with disability are not considered real humans with real emotions, instead they are simply subjects.

Other important characters who were potentially disabled in Morrison's "Recitatif" is Roberta's mother and Mary, Twyla's mother. In the story's opening, Twyla states that her mother "danced all night" and that "Roberta's mother was sick", which is why their mothers sent the girls to the orphanage. Continuing the literary use of ambiguity, Morrison never explicitly reveals the diseases of either of the girls' mothers' illnesses. Roberta's mother's illness rendered her incapable of caring for Roberta and caused her to be raised in an institution suggesting she has a mental illness, similarly, Twyla's mother is suggested to have a mental illness as well as she has an obsession with dancing that has rendered her incapable from properly caring for her daughter. Twyla also equated her mother to Maggie as she highlighted that both of their disabilities rendered them deaf, although it is unclear if they have a literal inability to hear sound. Instead, them being deaf refers to Maggie and Mary's detachment from their surroundings.

== Characters ==
=== Main characters ===
Twyla – Twyla is the narrator and one of the main characters of the story. In the story's opening, Twyla is introduced as an eight-year-old girl that was brought to an orphanage because her mother frequently neglected her. Her mother managed to instil prejudice and bias in her against individuals who are the same race of Roberta. Twyla is described as having resentment and rage towards her mother for abandoning her that she shows in her reflections and comparisons of other characters and her mother. However, throughout the story, Twyla's character develops into a more understanding and open-minded individual because of her friendship with Roberta and her experiences at the orphanage. Twyla shows significant growth, emotionally and socially, throughout the story.

Roberta – Roberta is the other main character, alongside Twyla. Similar to Twyla, Roberta's mother brought her to the orphanage because she is ill and incapable of caring for her. However, Roberta was not as neglected as Twyla was as Roberta's mother would bring Roberta food to the shelter during visits, unlike Twyla's mother. Roberta also comes from a wealthy socioeconomic background, unlike Twyla. Nevertheless, Roberta harbors resentment towards her because her mother could not properly care for her. However, she takes her resentment out on Maggie as she yearns to hurt Maggie because Maggie's illness is seemingly similar to her mother's. As the story develops, Roberta becomes increasingly critical of Twyla and her attitude towards Roberta's lifestyle as well as Twyla's prejudice. Compared to Twyla, Roberta's character is unstable as she constantly struggles with her identity throughout the short story.

=== Minor characters ===
Maggie – Maggie is at the orphanage Twyla and Roberta were brought to. However, Maggie is a childlike, disabled woman that works in the kitchen at St. Bonny's orphanage. The children of the orphanage refer to her as the "kitchen woman" and they describe her as old, "sandy-colored", and "bow-legged". Although Maggie's character is used to highlight the prejudice and biases against disabled people, her character is also symbolic of Twyla and Roberta's hurt and anger towards their mothers, who are also disabled in some form. Maggie, similar to the girls' mothers, is vulnerable and helpless which angers the girls as it reflects their own vulnerability and helplessness caused by their ill mothers. Regarding race, the abuse of Maggie by the girls is also partly symbolic of the system of oppression of African Americans as they are considered powerless and abused during this time.

Mary – Mary is Twyla's mother. Mary is potentially disabled as Twyla, her daughter, describes her as someone who never stops dancing, indicating a possible mental illness and making her incapable of taking proper care of her daughter. Mary is neglectful to her daughter, so she sends her to St. Bonny's orphanage. Throughout the story, Mary's character never changed even in Twyla's adulthood.

Roberta's Mother – Although her name is never revealed in the short story, Roberta's mother plays an important role in the development of the story itself and of Roberta's character and her relationship with Twyla. She is also severely disabled, which causes her to send her daughter to the orphanage. Unlike Twyla's mother, Roberta's mother always provided for her daughter's basic needs. However, similar to Twyla's mother, Roberta's mother never changed and never got better.

The Gar Girls – The gar girls are a group of teenage girls at St. Bonny's orphanage that scare the younger girls, including Twyla and Roberta. Their name comes from Roberta as she compared them to "gargoyles". The gar girls are also children that came from difficult backgrounds and were desperate to escape. The gar girls symbolize individuals who are subject to abuse and neglect, ultimately becoming abusers emphasizing the cycle of abuse and self-destruction.
