= Tar Baby (novel) =

1981 novel by Toni Morrison

- Cover of the first edition
- Author: Toni Morrison
- Language: English
- Genre: African-American literature
- Publisher: Alfred A. Knopf Inc.
- Publication date: March 12, 1981
- Publication place: United States
- Media type: Print (hardback & paperback)
- Pages: 320
- ISBN: 0-394-42329-1
- OCLC: 6789342
- Dewey Decimal: 813/.54 19
- LC Class: PS3563.O8749 T37 1981
- Preceded by: Song of Solomon
- Followed by: Beloved

Tar Baby is a 1981 novel by the American author Toni Morrison, her fourth to be published.

== Plot introduction ==
This novel portrays a love affair between Jadine and Son, two Black Americans from very different worlds. Jadine is a beautiful Sorbonne graduate and fashion model who has been sponsored into wealth and privilege by the Streets, a wealthy white family who employ Jadine's aunt and uncle as domestic servants. Son is an impoverished, strong-minded man who washes up at the Streets' estate on a Caribbean island. As Jadine and Son come together, their affair ruptures the illusions and self-deceptions that held together the world and relationships at the estate. They travel back to the United States to search for somewhere they can both be at home, and find that their homes hold poison for each other. The struggle of Jadine and Son reveals the pain, struggle, and compromises confronting Black Americans seeking to live and love with integrity in the United States.

== Title ==
Tar Baby is also a name [...] that white people call black children, black girls, as I recall.
At one time, a tar pit was a holy place, at least an important place, because tar was used to build things.
It held together things like Moses' little boat and the pyramids.
For me, the tar baby came to mean the black woman who can hold things together.

— interview with Morrison by Karin L. Badt (1995)

== Reception ==
Kirkus Reviews in March 1981 stated: "Morrison's fine-tuned, high-strung characters this time—black and white Americans caught up together in a "wide and breezy" house on a Caribbean island—may lack the psychic wingspread of Sula or Milkman of Song of Solomon. Yet within the swift of her dazzlingly mythic/animistic fancies, and dialogue sharp as drum raps, they carry her speculations—about black and white relationships and black female identity—as lightly as racing silks. ... Scouring contemporary insights—in prose as lithe and potent as vines in a rain forest."

In The New York Times, novelist John Irving wrote of Tar Baby: "...Toni Morrison's greatest accomplishment is that she has raised her novel above the social realism that too many black novels and women's novels are trapped in. She has succeeded in writing about race and women symbolically."
