= Burn This Book =

2009 book edited by Toni Morrison

Burn This Book: PEN Writers Speak Out on the Power of the Word
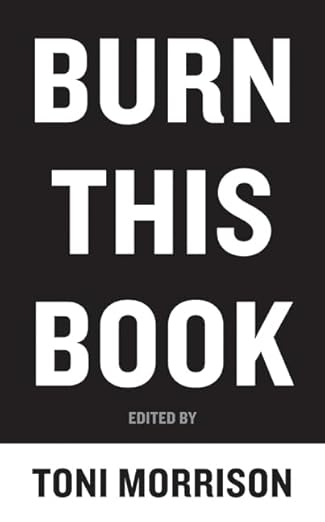
- Editor: Toni Morrison
- Language: English
- Publisher: HarperCollins USA
- Publication date: June 2009
- Publication place: United States
- Media type: Print (hardcover)
- Pages: 128
- ISBN: 978-0061774003

Burn This Book: PEN Writers Speak Out on the Power of the Word is a 2009 book about censorship in literature, edited by Toni Morrison. It includes essays by Russell Banks, Nadine Gordimer, David Grossman, Pico Iyer, Orhan Pamuk, Ed Park, Salman Rushdie, and John Updike. The book was created in partnership with PEN America. Three of the essays, "Freedom to Write" by Pamuk, "Writing in the Dark" by Grossman, and "Peril" by Morrison, were adapted from previous speeches delivered to PEN.

== Contents ==
1. "Peril", Toni Morrison
2. "Why Write?", John Updike
3. "Writing in the Dark", David Grossman
4. "Out from Under the Cloud of Unknowing", Francine Prose
5. "The Man, the Men at the Station", Pico Iyer
6. "Notes on Literature and Engagement", Russell Banks
7. "Talking to Strangers", Paul Auster
8. "Freedom to Write", Orhan Pamuk
9. "Notes on Writing and the Nation", Salman Rushdie
10. "The Sudden Sharp Memory", Ed Park
11. "Witness: The Inward Testimony", Nadine Gordimer
