= Song of Solomon (novel) =

1977 novel by Toni Morrison

- Cover of the first edition
- Author: Toni Morrison
- Genre: African-American literature
- Publisher: Alfred Knopf, Inc.
- Publication date: 1977; 49 years ago
- Publication place: United States
- Media type: Print (hardcover, paperback)
- Pages: 337
- ISBN: 0-394-49784-8
- OCLC: 15366961
- Dewey Decimal: 813/.54 19
- LC Class: PS3563.O8749 S6 1987
- Preceded by: Sula
- Followed by: Tar Baby

Song of Solomon is a 1977 novel by American author Toni Morrison, her third to be published. It follows the life of Macon "Milkman" Dead III, an African-American man living in Michigan, from birth to adulthood.

This novel won the National Book Critics Circle Award, was chosen for Oprah Winfrey's popular book club, and was cited by the Swedish Academy in awarding Morrison the 1993 Nobel Prize in Literature. In 1998, the Radcliffe Publishing Course named it the 25th best English-language novel of the 20th century.

== Plot ==
Robert Smith, an African-American insurance agent, jumps off a roof while trying to fly as a crowd of people gather to watch. The appearance of Smith on the roof causes a woman named Ruth Dead to go into labor. In the chaos that follows, the hospital admits her and she delivers her son, Macon Dead III—the first African-American child born in the hospital. Macon Dead III grows up stifled, alienated, and uninterested in his home life in Southside. Ruth is still breastfeeding him when he is four years old. One of her husband's employees witnesses this and nicknames the boy "Milkman".

Milkman's relationship with his family is strained, particularly towards his father, Macon Jr. As Milkman enters his teens, his aunt Pilate, a bootlegger and conjure woman, becomes a central figure in his life. For Milkman, Pilate becomes the first glimpse into his family's past. Macon Jr. and Pilate grew up on the farm of their father, Macon Dead Sr. They witnessed their father's murder by whites who coveted his property. Fleeing his killers, Pilate and Macon Jr. found a cave filled with bags of gold, but did not take it for fear of reprisals.

Milkman forms a sexual connection with his cousin Hagar, but later spurns her. Hagar becomes obsessed with him, attempting to kill him once a month, but never following through.

Milkman mentions to his father, Macon Jr., the heavy bag that hangs from the ceiling of Pilate's modest home. Pilate mentions that the bag contains her "inheritance." Thinking it must be one of the bags of gold from the cave, Macon Jr. sends Milkman and his friend Guitar to steal the bag from Pilate. Milkman and Guitar succeed, but are arrested by the police after they discover the bag contains human bones. Macon Jr. and Pilate go to the police station to free the two young men.

Milkman makes a journey south to the old family dwelling outside Home, Pennsylvania in search of the gold. After talking to several people, Milkman deduces that Pilate must have retrieved the gold and taken it to Virginia. Milkman stumbles across Shalimar, Virginia, by accident. While out hunting with older men from Shalimar, Milkman is attacked by Guitar, who has followed him to Virginia. Guitar is under the impression that Milkman has taken the gold, and thus wants revenge. Struggling, Milkman discharges his gun, scaring away Guitar.

Milkman sees the children of the town playing and singing the "Song of Solomon" about a slave who escaped bondage by flying home to Africa, leaving his wife and infant son behind. Milkman remembers that Pilate sang a similar song, and realizes that the song is about his own family. He heads back to Michigan to find Pilate.

While Milkman is gone in Virginia, Hagar has sunk into a terrible depression from him having spurned her. Thinking that Milkman would want her if she fixes herself up, Hagar buys dresses, makeup, and a haircut. The effort amounts to little, and Hagar succumbs to her grief. A collection is taken up by the community to bury Hagar, and Pilate sings a mournful song at her granddaughter's funeral.

Milkman thinks it only appropriate that the bones of Macon Dead Sr. be laid to rest in his ancestral home in Shalimar. Milkman finds Pilate at her home, and she knocks him unconscious for the grief that caused her granddaughter to die. When he comes to, Milkman convinces her to travel with him to Virginia and bury her father. They make the journey and bury Macon Dead Sr. overlooking the ravine. After placing the bones in the grave, Pilate is killed by a gunshot from Guitar that was intended for Milkman. The novel ends with Milkman leaping toward Guitar, thus learning to "fly".

== Reception and legacy ==
Song of Solomon, Morrison's third novel, was met with widespread acclaim, and Morrison earned the National Book Critics Circle Award for Fiction in 1978. Reynolds Price, reviewing the novel for The New York Times, concluded: "Toni Morrison has earned attention and praise. Few Americans know, and can say, more than she has in this wise and spacious novel."

The novel has faced several challenges and bans in schools throughout the U.S. since 1993.

The main character inspired the name of the band The Dead Milkmen, formed in 1983.

In 2015, Robert McCrum's chronological list of the 100 best novels written in English, which was published in The Guardian newspaper, named Song of Solomon at No. 89.

In March 2021, Playground Entertainment announced plans to co-produce a limited television series adaptation of Toni Morrison's 1977 novel Song of Solomon with Fremantle. George C. Wolfe was in negotiations to write and direct the series, with Playground's Colin Callender, Scott Huff, and David Stern as executive producers.
