= Sula (novel) =

1973 novel by Toni Morrison

- First edition
- Author: Toni Morrison
- Language: English
- Genre: African-American literature
- Publisher: Knopf
- Publication date: November 1973; 53 years ago
- Publication place: United States
- Media type: Print (hardback and paperback)
- Pages: 192 (hardback)
- ISBN: 0-394-48044-9 (hardback edition)
- OCLC: 662097
- Dewey Decimal: 813/.5/4
- LC Class: PZ4.M883 Su PS3563.O8749
- Preceded by: The Bluest Eye
- Followed by: Song of Solomon

Sula is a 1973 novel by American author Toni Morrison, her first novel published after The Bluest Eye (1970). The novel tells the story of two girls, Sula and Nel, and their friendship and coming of age in a black community in Ohio.

== Plot summary ==
=== Background ===
The Bottom was a Black neighborhood on a hill above the fictional town of Medallion, Ohio, set to be bulldozed at the beginning of the novel for the creation of a golf course. The Bottom originated as an agreement between a White farmer and his Black slave. The farmer had promised freedom and a piece of valley land to his slave should he complete some difficult chores. Upon the completion of the chores, the farmer regrets his end of the bargain, no longer wanting to give up the land. In order to get out of the arrangement, the farmer feigns regret to the slave over having to give him valley land rather than "Bottom" land. The farmer claimed that "Bottom" land (actually located on top of a hill) would be better than valley land because it was closer to the bottom of heaven.

=== Synopsis ===
The story is organized by chronological chapters labeled with years. In "1919", the first named character, handsome Shadrack, returns from World War I a shattered man, suffering from shell shock or PTSD and unable to accept the world he used to belong in. As a way to compartmentalize the unpredictable nature of death, Shadrack invents a National Suicide Day to be held annually on January 3. Shadrack proposed that Medallion citizens could kill themselves or each other on this day and be free from death for the rest of the year. The town begrudgingly accepts Shadrack as a part of their community despite his outbursts.

In "1920" and "1921", the narrator contrasts the families of the children Nel Wright and Sula Peace, who both grow up with no father figure. Nel, the product of a mother knee-deep in social conventions, grows up in a stable home. Nel is initially torn between the rigid conventionality of her mother Helene Wright, who dislikes Sula's family instantly, and her inherent curiosity about the world, which she discovers on a trip. Though she vows to explore more of the world, she ultimately never leaves The Bottom again. This experience ultimately prompts Nel to begin a friendship with Sula. The Peace family is the opposite: Sula lives with her grandmother Eva and her mother Hannah, both of whom are seen by the town as eccentric, loose, yet Hannah was genuinely loved by all men, and Eva was very respected by all women. Their house serves as a home for three informally adopted boys and a steady stream of boarders. The extremely strained relationship between Hannah and Eva is revealed.

Despite their differences, Sula and Nel become fiercely attached to each other as adolescents. They share every part of their lives, including the shared memory of a traumatic event. One day, they playfully swing a neighborhood boy, Chicken Little, around by his hands. Sula loses her grip, and he falls into a nearby river and drowns. They do not tell anyone of their role in his death. Though Sula grieves with guilt, Nel feels relief after deciding that the event is primarily Sula's fault. Shadrack lives in a shack by the river's edge, and the girls are uncertain if he witnessed Chicken Little's death. To determine if he saw, Sula visits the shack alone and is surprised at its orderliness. Sula is unable to confront Shadrack through her tears. He comforts her and she runs away, accidentally leaving behind her belt. Shadrack hangs the belt on his wall in memory of his only visitor.

One day, Hannah tries to light a fire outside and her dress catches fire. Eva sees this happening from upstairs and jumps out the window in an attempt to save her daughter's life. Sula, who was sitting on the porch, simply watched her mother burn. An ambulance comes, but Hannah dies en route to the hospital, with Eva injured as well. Other residents of the Bottom believe Sula remained still because she was stunned by the incident. Eva believes that Sula stood and watched out of curiosity.

As an adult, Nel chooses to get married, breaking the childhood promise of the girls to share everything. Sula lives a life of ardent independence and total disregard for social conventions. Shortly after Nel's wedding, Sula leaves the Bottom for 10 years. She has many affairs and attends college. When she returns to the Bottom and to Nel, who became a conventional wife and mother, they reconcile briefly.

The rest of the town grows to resent Sula, in part because of her many affairs with married men. The husbands start a rumor that Sula slept with White men, worsening the town's opinion of Sula. The town's hatred of Sula gives them the impetus to live harmoniously with one another, as well as treat each other better. Sula's affairs give the wives a reason to soothe the bruised egos of their husbands, while Sula's lack of family at her age is scorned by all the women and causes them to be better mothers. Though Shadrack is typically vulgar and shocking to other townspeople, he treats Sula with respect.

Nel and Sula end their friendship after Sula has an affair with Nel's husband Jude. Just before Sula died in 1940, they reconciled half-heartedly. With Sula's death, the harmony that had reigned in the town quickly dissolved. Sula dies alone after a conversation with Nel. Shadrack, whose PTSD has faded enough for loneliness to crawl back in, is the only one saddened by her death.

Nel never remarries and becomes an overbearing mother. The Bottom slowly dissolves after Sula's death, becoming a different place. Nel visits Eva in 1965 in an elderly care facility, where Eva tells her that she knew about the death of Chicken Little and Nel's complicity. Nel replies that the blame is just on Sula but remembers her old promise to Sula to share everything.

Nel says goodbye to Sula at her gravestone, realizing that her loneliness is not from missing her ex-husband but from missing Sula. She cries in grief as she recalls the years spent without her.

== Characters ==
- Sula Peace: Nel's childhood best friend, whose return to the Bottom disrupts the whole community. The main reason for Sula's strangeness is her defiance of gender norms and traditional morality, symbolized by the birthmark "that spread from the middle of the lid toward the eyebrow, shaped something like a stemmed rose," which, according to some psychoanalytic readings, is a dual symbol with both phallic and vaginal resonance.
- Eva Peace: Sula's grandmother, who is missing one leg. Though the circumstances are never fully explained, it is suggested that she purposely put it under a train in order to collect insurance money to support her three young children after her husband left her. She has a peculiar relationship with her children. She passes on to Hannah and then Sula a need for male attention.
- BoyBoy: Sula's grandfather, who leaves Eva for another woman.
- Hannah Peace: Sula's mother; Eva's eldest daughter. She married Rekus, who died when Sula was three years old. Hannah is a promiscuous and care-free woman who later burns to death in front of her mother and daughter. Her daughter Sula witnessed the fire but did nothing, while her mother tried to save her by jumping on top of her from her bedroom window.
- Eva (Pearl) Peace: Sula's aunt; Eva Sr.'s youngest daughter and middle child. She married at fourteen and moved to Michigan.
- Ralph (Plum) Peace: Sula's uncle; Eva's son and youngest child. Plum was a WWI veteran and a heroin addict. Eva burns him alive with kerosene because of his mental instability.
- Helene Wright: Nel's strait-laced and clean mother. Though the daughter of a prostitute, she was raised by her devoutly religious grandmother, Cecile.
- Nel Wright: Sula's best friend (can also be considered a main protagonist) who does not want to be like her mother because she will never be reduced to "custard" and she will not be humiliated by other people as her mother is. Nel is the opposite of Sula: she decided to marry, have children and stay in the Bottom when she became an adult. She is Sula's best friend as they are children and then their relationship turns into something more complex when Jude left Nel for Sula.
- Shadrack: A paranoid shell-shocked WWI veteran, who returns to Sula and Nel's hometown, Medallion. He invents National Suicide Day.
- Jude Greene: Nel's husband, who leaves Nel due to a love affair with Sula.
- Ajax (Albert Jacks): Sula's confidant and lover.
- Tar Baby (Pretty Johnnie): A quiet, cowardly, and reserved partially or possibly fully White man who rents out one of the rooms in the Peace household. It is believed that Tar Baby has come up to the Bottom to drink himself to death.
- The Deweys: three boys, each about one year apart from one another in age, who were each nicknamed "Dewey" by Eva. Their real names are never written in the novel, and after the introduction of these characters, the three are referred to as one being, thus Morrison's use of a lowercase "d" in "dewey" for the rest of the novel.
- Chicken Little: The little boy who drowns when Sula accidentally throws him into the river.

== Literary significance and criticism ==
Sula was integral to the formation of black feminist literary criticism. In 1977, a black feminist literary critic Barbara Smith, in her essay "Toward a Black Feminist Criticism", advanced a definition of black feminist literary criticism and (in)famously performed a lesbian reading of Sula. In her 1980 essay "New Directions for Black Feminist Criticism", Black feminist literary critic Deborah McDowell responded to Smith's challenge by acknowledging the need for a black feminist criticism and calling for a firmer definition of black feminism.

In her essay "Boundaries: Or Distant Relations and Close Kin", McDowell draws on the critical practices of Hortense Spillers and Hazel Carby and reads Sula from a poststructuralist perspective, urging black women critics to "develop and practice […] critical approaches interactively, dialogically" instead of viewing "black female identity as unitary essence yielding an indigenous critical methodology". As McDowell points out, the ambiguity of Sula as a character subverts traditional binary oppositions, and "transcends the boundaries of social and linguistic convention". The decentering and temporal deferral of the character who lends the novel its title similarly "denies the whole notion of character as static essence, replacing it with the idea of character as process." This "complex set of dynamics" forces the reader to "fill in the gaps" as well as to "bridge the gaps separating [them] from the text" and therefore makes them active participants in the meaning-making process.

Roderick Ferguson elaborates on the potential of Sula as "an opportunity to formulate politics". Sula, Ferguson argues, gave black lesbian feminists "a model of alternative subjectivities". The novel became a useful tool to invent new ways of thinking. By illustrating alternative social relationships, it provided a way for women of color feminists to imagine new possibilities outside of the constraints of nationalism.

== Television series ==
In May 2022, it was reported that HBO will adapt the novel into a television limited series. The project will be created and written by Shannon M. Houston.

== In popular culture ==
In 2020, Jamila Woods released the song "Sula", and a video version, "Sula (Hardcover)", based on the novel.

A heartwarming, posthumous dedication to a best friend in reference to Toni Morrison's "Sula"
