= Home (Morrison novel) =

2012 novel by Toni Morrison

- Author: Toni Morrison
- Language: English
- Genre: African-American literature
- Publisher: Alfred A. Knopf Inc.
- Publication date: May 8, 2012
- Publication place: United States
- Media type: Print (hardback & paperback), audiobook, e-book
- Pages: 145
- ISBN: 978-0-307-59416-7
- OCLC: 758388708
- LC Class: PS3563.O8749 H66 2012
- Preceded by: A Mercy
- Followed by: God Help the Child

Home is the tenth novel by the American author Toni Morrison, originally published in 2012 by Alfred A. Knopf. Set in the 1950s, Morrison's Home rewrites the narrative of the time period. The novel tells the story of 24-year-old war veteran Frank Money as he navigates America amidst his trauma from serving in the Korean War. After receiving a letter that alerts him of the danger his younger sister, Cee, has found herself in, he sets out on a journey back home to rural Georgia.

Through the stories of two siblings, Morrison's novel touches upon historic issues of the racist treatment towards black soldiers returning home from war and the medical racism towards black bodies throughout history.

== Plot summary ==
Home opens with a memory of two kid siblings in the fictional town of Lotus, Georgia, watching through grass, the burial of an unknown black body by men alongside horses. In the present day, Frank Money, a Korean War veteran, awakens in a mental hospital room, cuffed to the bed. He recalls receiving a letter warning him: "Come fast. She be dead if you tarry." He escapes barefoot from the hospital to an AME Zion Church. He meets Reverend John Locke and his wife, Jean, who let him stay for the night. Reverend Locke gives Frank money to buy a bus ticket to Portland.

Frank travels on trains from Portland to Chicago, recalling gruesome memories of the war and of an apartment life alongside his former lover, Lily. A train waiter directs Frank to a restaurant called Booker's where he makes friends with Billy Watson who leads him to his house to meet his family and stay the night. Sleeping at their family's house, Frank suffers from nightmares throughout the night and worries about the letter he has received from a woman named Sarah that warns him of the danger his younger sister, Cee, has found herself in. Billy takes Frank clothes shopping where they are subjected to a random search by the police as they exit the store. The police let them go after taking note of the Korean War medal Frank dons.

In Atlanta, Cee recalls the two siblings' childhood in Lotus, Georgia living under their grandfather and his wife, Lenore. Cee is disregarded by her step-grandmother who regards the terms of her birth (being born in the street) as "sinful". The children's parents both worked multiple jobs and the care of Cee was left to Frank, just four years older. After Frank leaves for the war, Cee meets Prince, a boy visiting from Atlanta. Prince advances after Cee and the two later marry. He takes Cee back to Atlanta, where she later discovers that he only married her so as to attain the vehicle her family would lend to him.

Now abandoned by Prince and unaware of his whereabouts, Cee lives alone and works as a dishwasher. Cee does not wish to return home, so she visits her neighbor, Thelma, to look for another job. Thelma informs her of an available job working for a doctor and Cee travels to the doctor's house where she meets their house-keeper named Sarah Williams. She gets the job and is told by Sarah that Dr. Beau works as a scientist and performs experiments. The following weeks follows Cee working and living at the Scott's house as she comes to admire the work Dr. Beau does for women.

Lily works as a seamstress until the acting studio she works at gets shut down, and then proceeds to work at a dry cleaner's, where she meets Frank. The two come to live together in her apartment, but Lily grows dissatisfied with Frank's indifference and irresponsibility. After Frank leaves, Lily comes across a purse full of coins and feels relief and motivation towards her dream of becoming a successful seamstress.

Frank looks back upon his war memory of a young Korean girl scavenging for food everyday from the soldiers' garbage. She is later killed by Frank's relief guard after grabbing his crotch. Frank arrives at Dr. Beau's house where the doctor fires a gun at him, but the gun's chamber is empty. He finds Cee unconscious and bloody and a taxi takes the two siblings back home to Lotus. Frank calls upon the help of a Miss Ethel Fordham who hurries Cee into her home.

While Frank is not allowed to enter Miss Ethel's house, the women in the neighborhood all visit Cee to give their own remedies to help heal her. Cee is nursed back to health for the next two months, but Miss Ethel reveals that her body is no longer able to have children. It is then confessed by Frank that it was not the relief guard that killed the Korean child, but him after the girl aroused him when she touched his crotch. Frank takes Cee to the field they hid in as children to dig up the man's body they witnessed be buried as kids. They place his bones in a quilt made by Cee to bury him in the woods under a sweet bay tree.

== Major characters ==
Frank Money

Frank Money is the protagonist of Home and a Korean War veteran. He suffers from trauma from the war and guilt over killing a Korean child and his inability to save his childhood friends. From a young age, Frank looks after his younger sister and goes on a journey back home in order to rescue her from Dr. Beau.

Ycidra "Cee" Money

Cee is the younger sister of Frank Money and grows up under the protection of her older brother. She is left alone after Frank leaves for the war and her husband abandons her. Looking for a job, Cee comes to work for Dr. Beau and becomes sterilized. By the end of the novel, Cee becomes more assured in herself.

Ethel Fordham

Ethel Fordham is the woman in Lotus who leads the community's effort to treat Cee. She gives the news to Cee about her inability to conceive and advises her to become more confident in herself.

Sarah Williams

Sarah Williams is a housekeeper to Dr. Beau and his wife, working for the couple since she was 14 years old. She is a friend to Cee and is the one to send the letter to Frank about Cee being in danger.

Dr. Beauregard Scott

Dr. Beau is a eugenecist Lost Cause doctor and scientist that Cee comes to work for. He experiments on women's bodies and leaves Cee sterilized after experimenting on her.

Lenore

Lenore is the step-grandmother to Frank and Cee. She is an abusive figure to the two kids throughout their childhood and often refers to Cee as a "gutter child". Lenore later suffers from a stroke and is unable to speak intelligibly.

Lily

Lily is Frank's ex-lover who aspires to be a seamstress. Frank and Lily fight often through the time of their relationship and she is relieved when he leaves.

Mike and Stuff

Mike and Stuff are childhood friends of Frank who both die in the Korean War.

Reverend John Locke

Reverend John Locke is a reverend that Frank seeks out from the AME Zion Church. He admonishes the treatment of black soldiers after the war and gives Frank bus fare money to travel towards Georgia.

Billy Watson

Billy Watson is a man that Frank meets in Chicago at the Booker's diner. Billy takes him spend the night with his family and takes him clothes shopping.

== Major themes ==
Family

The relationship between Frank and Cee is the central theme throughout the novel. In their early childhood, Frank is the one to take the most care of his younger sister, Cee. As children, they were neglected by their parents who each worked multiple jobs and were abused by their step-grandmother.

Over the course of the journey Frank takes to rescue his sister, the two siblings develop as separate individuals. The end of the novel sees them return to their childhood home from which they had both worked hard to run away. In Frank and Cee's reconciliation, they come to face their own trauma and form their own identities.

War and trauma

After Frank returns from serving in the Korean War, he suffers from trauma and survivor guilt from being the sole survivor out of his friends who he entered into the military with.

On the train rides to Georgia, Frank looks back on both the memories of the friends' excitement to leave Lotus and the memories of watching them die before him. He finds himself unable to visit the family of his friends afterwards, consumed by guilt. Through conversations with Lily, Frank seems unmotivated towards life and has no direction or goals. He fulfills himself through alcohol and his relationship with Lily.

There is an image of a young girl present within the novel that Frank struggles with. He runs away from a church convention after interacting with a young girl. Frank reveals to the reader the presence of a young girl that frequently visited their camp, her hand scavenging for food. He later murders her after he gets aroused from her touching his crotch. Frank is only able to accept his murder of the young girl after he successfully rescues Cee.

Morrison displays the general attitude about the Korean War during the 1950s where a conversation between different war veterans takes place and they have an ignorant mindset towards the events that took place in Korea, disregarding its importance.

Racism

The Korean War was the first U.S. war where military forces were desegregated. Even still, Frank is subject to racist encounters from law enforcement, regardless of his veteran status and service to the country. Morrison illustrates how the presence of racism by figures in power continued to prevail against black soldiers after they returned from the war. From instances where segregation lines were drawn on trains and random police searches were made towards black citizens, discriminatory acts persisted in the 1950s. As Reverend John Locke hears of Frank's veteran status, he comments upon the blatant disregard of black soldiers after returning from the war and the mistreatment they face.

Frank is desperate to be able to rescue his sister from the experimentation of Dr. Beau, stemming from his inability to save his friends in the war. Dr. Beau is a eugenicist that is known to perform experiments on black people as revealed by Sarah. His disregard for the consent of Cee is an indicator of the medical racism conducted on black bodies in the name of scientific research. The sterilization of Cee's body exemplifies the violence committed against the bodies of black women.

Womanhood

Home follows Cee's journey to reaching her own autonomy and becoming an individualized person outside of others' expectations. From a young age, Cee is raised with no central mother figure to guide her as her mother was neglectful and her step-grandmother, abusive. As a child, her behavior and appearance is scrutinized by her step-grandmother. From a young age, Frank takes the role as her protector and oversees most of her life. This treatment stifles Cee's growth as a woman outside of being Frank's younger sister.

As Frank rescues Cee, it is the women of the neighborhood that nurse her back to health. They display their feminine sense of community as they share their remedies in healing Cee. Miss Ethel breaks the news to her that she is unable to have children due to the experimentation she endured and Cee mourns the loss of a child she will never have.

The end of the novel sees Cee working against continuing to follow the lead of her older brother. She works towards her own independence, seen through her learning and working with the other women in order to learn how to quilt.

== Reception ==
In a starred review, Publishers Weekly described Morrison's novel as "[b]eautiful, brutal, as is Morrison's perfect prose." Writing in The New York Times, Leah Hager Cohen criticized the lack of subtlety in the novel's symbolism, but concluded: "This work's accomplishment lies in its considerable capacity to make us feel that we are each not only resident but co-owner of, and collectively accountable for, this land we call home." In a review for The Washington Post, Ron Charles wrote: "This scarily quiet tale packs all the thundering themes Morrison has explored before. She's never been more concise, though, and that restraint demonstrates the full range of her power." Erich Schwartzel, of the Pittsburgh Post-Gazette, noted flashes of "beautiful, tactile writing", but characterized Home as "an easy narrative that...never finds a resplendence to place it alongside [Morrison's] better, more realized work."
