= A Mercy =

2008 novel by Toni Morrison

- First US edition
- Author: Toni Morrison
- Language: English
- Genre: African-American literature Historical Fiction
- Publisher: Knopf
- Publication date: November 11, 2008
- Publication place: United States
- Media type: Print (hardback, large print), unabridged audio CD, audiobook download, eBook
- Pages: 176 pp (hardcover edition)
- ISBN: 978-0-307-26423-7
- OCLC: 212855125
- Dewey Decimal: 813/.54 22
- LC Class: PS3563.O8749 M47 2008
- Preceded by: Love
- Followed by: Home

A Mercy is Toni Morrison's ninth novel. It was published in 2008. Set in colonial America in the late 17th century, it is the story of a European farmer, his purchased wife, and his growing household of indentured or enslaved white, Native American, and African characters. It made the New York Times Book Review list of "10 Best Books of 2008" as chosen by the paper's editors. In Fall 2010, A Mercy was chosen for the One Book, One Chicago program. In 2024, it was ranked 47th in the New York Times list of the best 100 books of the 21st century.

== Synopsis ==
Florens, a slave, lives and works on Jacob Vaark's rural New York farm. Lina, a Native American and fellow laborer on the Vaark farm, relates in a parallel narrative how she became one of a handful of survivors of a smallpox plague that destroyed her tribe. Vaark's wife Rebekka describes leaving England on a ship for the new world to be married to a man she has never seen. The deaths of their subsequent children are devastating, and Vaark accepts a young Florens from a debtor in the hopes that this new addition to the farm will help alleviate Rebekka's loneliness. Vaark, himself an orphan and poorhouse survivor, describes his journeys from New York to Maryland and Virginia, commenting on the role of religion in the culture of the different colonies, along with their attitudes toward slavery.

All these characters are bereft of their roots, struggling to survive in a new and alien environment filled with danger and disease. When smallpox threatens Rebekka's life, Florens, now 16, is sent to find a black freedman who has some knowledge of herbal medicines. Her journey is dangerous, ultimately proving to be the turning point in her life.

== Reviews ==
- Gates, David (November 28, 2008). "Original Sins". The New York Times.
- Updike, John (November 3, 2008). "Dreamy Wilderness: Unmastered Women in Colonial Virginia". The New Yorker. Vol. 38, no. 35. pp. 112–113. Archived from the original on May 14, 2009.
- Barker, Elspeth (November 2008). "Mother Hunger". The Literary Review.
