= Alabama Shakes discography =

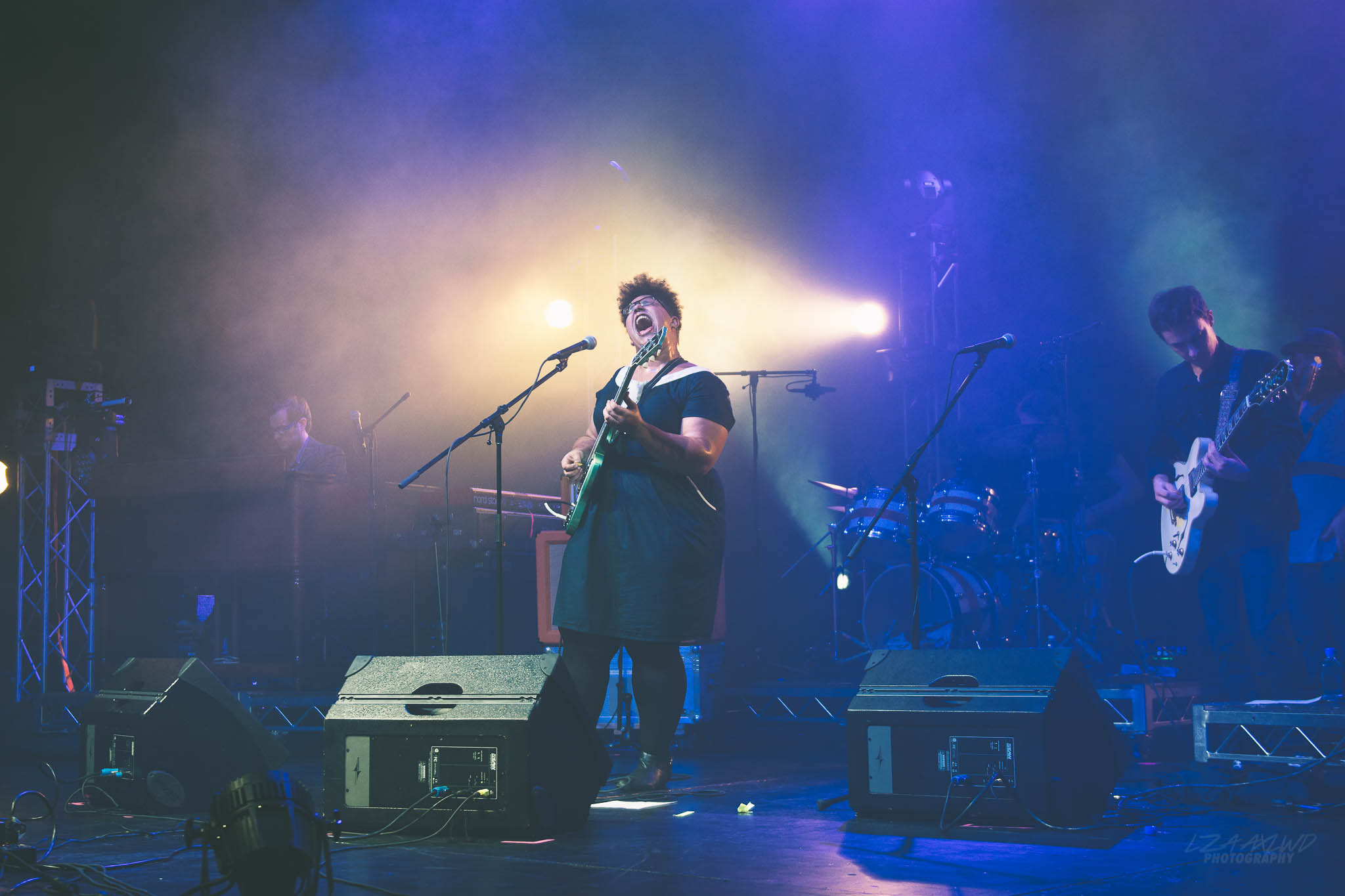
- Alabama Shakes performing in Santa Monica in 2014
- Studio albums: 3
- EPs: 3
- Singles: 17
- Music videos: 3

The discography of the American blues rock band Alabama Shakes consists of three studio albums, seventeen singles, and three extended plays (EPs). The band consists of Brittany Howard (lead vocals and rhythm guitar), Heath Fogg (lead guitar and vocals), Zac Cockrell (bass guitar) and Steve Johnson (drums, vocals, and percussion).

== Studio albums ==
List of studio albums, with selected chart positions and certifications
Title	Album details	Peak chart positions										Sales	Certifications
Title	Album details	US	AUS	BEL (FL)	FRA	GER	IRE	NL	SWE	SWI	UK	Sales	Certifications
Boys & Girls	Released: April 9, 2012; Label: ATO; Formats: LP, CD, LP + 7" vinyl digital download, streaming	6	4	4	62	59	5	7	34	48	3	US: 744,000	RIAA: Platinum; BPI: Gold; MC: Platinum
Sound & Color	Released: April 21, 2015; Label: ATO; Formats: LP, LP + 7", CD, digital download, streaming	1	12	12	41	28	12	4	37	10	6	US: 792,000	RIAA: Platinum; BPI: Silver; MC: Gold
I Must Be Dreaming	Released: August 28, 2026; Label: Island; Formats: LP, CD, cassette, digital download, streaming	157	—	61	— (Note: I Must Be Dreaming did not enter the France Albums Chart but peaked at number 177 on the French Physical Albums Chart.)	—	—	—	—	96	— (Note: I Must Be Dreaming did not enter the UK Albums Chart, but peaked at number 27 on the UK Album Sales Chart.)		

== Extended plays ==
Title	EP details	Peak chart positions				
Title	EP details	US	US Alt.	US Indie	US Rock	UK Phys.
Alabama Shakes EP	Released: September 13, 2011; Label: self-released; Format: CD, digital download	—	—	—	—	10
Heavy Chevy	Released: April 10, 2012; Label: ATO; Format: 7" vinyl	—	—	—	—	—
iTunes Session	Released: February 5, 2013; Label: ATO; Format: Digital download, streaming	124	25	20	36	—
"—" denotes a recording that did not chart or was not released in that territory.

== Singles ==
List of singles, with selected chart positions and certifications, showing year released and album name
Title	Year	Peak chart positions										Certifications	Album
Title	Year	US	US Rock	BEL (FL)	CAN	FRA	IRE	JPN	NL	POL	UK	Certifications	Album
"Heavy Chevy"	2011	—	—	—	—	—	—	—	—	—	—		Heavy Chevy
"Hold On"	2012	93	15	34	81	—	70	69	49	—	104	RIAA: Gold; BPI: Silver; MC: Gold	Boys & Girls
"Be Mine / You Ain't Alone"	2012	—	—	—	—	—	—	—	—	—	—		Live at Third Man Records
"Always Alright"	2012	—	— (Note: "Always Alright" did not enter the Hot Rock & Alternative Songs chart but peaked at number 17 on the Rock Digital Song Sales chart.)	—	—	—	—	—	—	—	—		Silver Linings Playbook: Original Motion Picture Soundtrack
"I Ain't the Same"	2012	—	— (Note: "I Ain't the Same" did not enter the Hot Rock & Alternative Songs chart but peaked at number 15 on the Adult Alternative Airplay chart.)	—	—	—	—	—	—	—	—		Boys & Girls
"Hang Loose"	2013	—	— (Note: "Hang Loose" did not enter the Hot Rock & Alternative Songs chart but peaked at number 11 on the Adult Alternative Airplay chart.)	— (Note: "Hang Loose" did not enter the Flanders Ultratop 50, but peaked at number 15 on the Ultratip chart.)	—	—	—	—	—	—	—		Boys & Girls
"Don't Wanna Fight"	2015	—	13	— (Note: "Don't Wanna Fight" did not enter the Flanders Ultratop 50, but peaked at number 32 on the Ultratip chart.)	—	112	—	61	—	28	—	RIAA: Platinum; MC: Gold	Sound & Color
"Gimme All Your Love"	2015	—	36	—	—	—	—	—	—	6	—		Sound & Color
"Future People"	2015	—	37	—	—	—	—	—	—	—	—		Sound & Color
"Sound & Color"	2015	—	12	—	—	—	—	—	—	—	—		Sound & Color
"Joe (Live From Austin City Limits)"	2015	—	50	—	—	—	—	—	—	—	—		non-album single
"Killer Diller Blues"	2017	—	—	—	—	—	—	—	—	—	—		Music from The American Epic Sessions: Original Motion Picture Soundtrack
"Future People" (Live from Capitol Studio A)	2021	—	—	—	—	—	—	—	—	—	—		Sound & Color (Deluxe)
"Always Alright" (Live at KCRW)	2022	—	—	—	—	—	—	—	—	—	—		Boys & Girls (Deluxe Edition)
"Another Life"	2025	—	— (Note: "Another Life" did not enter the Hot Rock & Alternative Songs chart but peaked at number 30 on the Rock & Alternative Airplay chart.)	—	—	—	—	—	—	—	—		I Must Be Dreaming
"American Dream"	2026	—	—	—	—	—	—	—	—	—	—		I Must Be Dreaming
"I Feel Hope Coming"	2026	—	— (Note: "I Feel Hope Coming" did not enter the Hot Rock & Alternative Songs chart but peaked at number 38 on the Rock & Alternative Airplay chart.)	—	—	—	—	—	—	—	—		I Must Be Dreaming
"—" denotes a recording that did not chart or was not released in that territory.

== Other charting songs ==
Title	Year	Peak chart positions					Album
Title	Year	BEL (FL) Tip	MEX Air.	POL	SCO	UK Sales	Album
"I Found You"	2012	—	—	63	—	—	Boys & Girls
"Be Mine"	2012	—	36	—	—	—	Boys & Girls
"This Feeling"	2015	—	—	—	74	51	Sound & Color
"Guess Who"	2015	—	48	—	—	—	Sound & Color
"Shoegaze"	2015	24	—	—	—	—	Sound & Color
"—" denotes a recording that did not chart or was not released in that territory.

== Other appearances ==
Title	Year	Other artist(s)	Album
"Gimme All Your Love (Live)"	2018	—N/a	Artists Den One
"Sound & Color"	2019	Atlantic String Machine	The Bayfield Sessions

== Music videos ==
Title	Year	Director
"Hold On"	2012	Stephen Shirk/Chris Hershman
"I Ain't the Same"	2012	Jane Pollard
"Sound & Color"	2015	Mario Hugo
