= Grammy Award for Best Alternative Music Album =

Honor presented to recording artists for quality alternative music albums

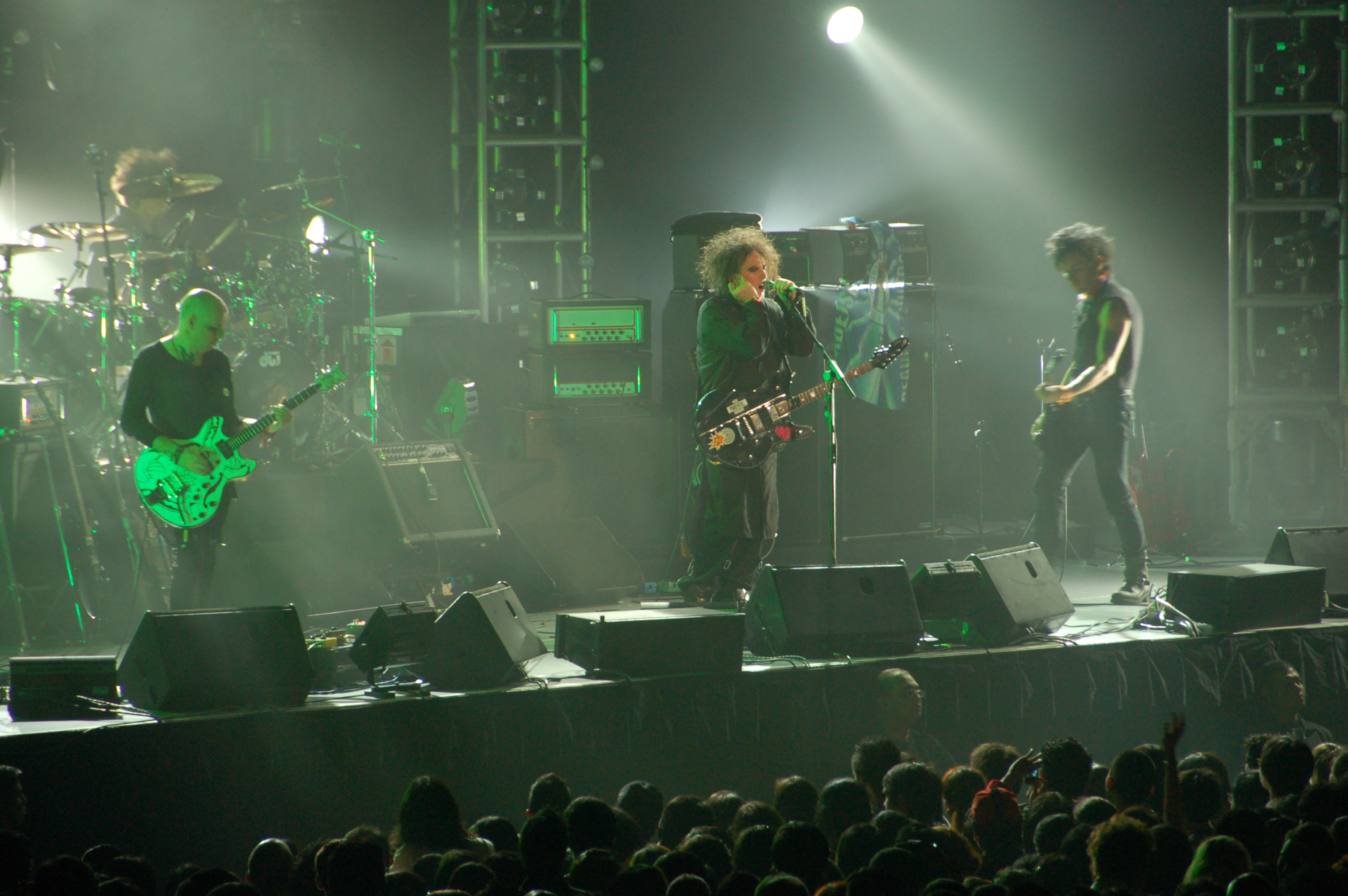
- Songs of a Lost World by The Cure is the most recent recipient
- Awarded for: Quality albums in the alternative genre
- Country: United States
- Presented by: National Academy of Recording Arts and Sciences
- First award: 1991
- Currently held by: The Cure — Songs of a Lost World (2026)
- Website: grammy.com

The Grammy Award for Best Alternative Music Album is an award presented to recording artists for quality albums in the alternative genre at the Grammy Awards, a ceremony that was established in 1958 and originally called the Gramophone Awards. Honors in several categories are presented at the ceremony annually by the National Academy of Recording Arts and Sciences of the United States to "honor artistic achievement, technical proficiency and overall excellence in the recording industry, without regard to album sales or chart position". In 2023, it was joined by a companion category, Best Alternative Music Performance.

== Criteria ==
While the definition of "alternative" has been debated, the award was first presented in 1991 to recognize non-mainstream rock albums "heavily played on college radio stations". After several updates of the category description, the Grammy organisation issued the following statement for the 2019 Grammy season:

Alternative is defined as a genre of music that embraces attributes of progression and innovation in both the music and attitudes associated with it. It is often a less intense version of rock or a more intense version of pop and is typically regarded as more original, eclectic, or musically challenging. It may embrace a variety of subgenres or any hybrids thereof and may include recordings that don't fit into other genre categories.

== History ==
In 1991, and from 1994 to 1999, the award was known as Best Alternative Music Performance. The award goes to the artist, producer and engineer/mixer, provided they are credited with more than 50% of playing time on the album. The lead performing artist is the only one who receives an official nomination. A producer or engineer with less than 50% of playing time, as well as the mastering engineer, can apply for a Winners Certificate. Before 2001, only the performing artist received a nomination and an award.

As of 2025, Radiohead, The White Stripes, Beck, and St. Vincent share the record for the most wins in this category, having won three times each, with St. Vincent being the first solo female to win the award thrice. Three female solo artists have won the award, Sinéad O'Connor and Fiona Apple; two bands with female members, The White Stripes and Alabama Shakes, have also won the award, as well as two all-female bands, Wet Leg and Boygenius. With nine nominations to date, Björk holds the record for the most nominations in this category; Radiohead singer Thom Yorke was nominated for the 2007 and 2020 awards for his solo albums, making him the most nominated person in this category with 10 total nominations. Björk holds the record for the most nominations for a solo artist, as well as the record for the most nominations without a win. Vampire Weekend and Coldplay have each received the award twice, and Coldplay are the only group to win two years consecutively. American artists have been presented with the award more than any other nationality, though it has been presented to musicians or groups from the United Kingdom five times, from Ireland twice, and from France and Australia once each. Artists from Canada, Iceland, and Sweden have been nominated for the award, but none have won.

== Recipients ==
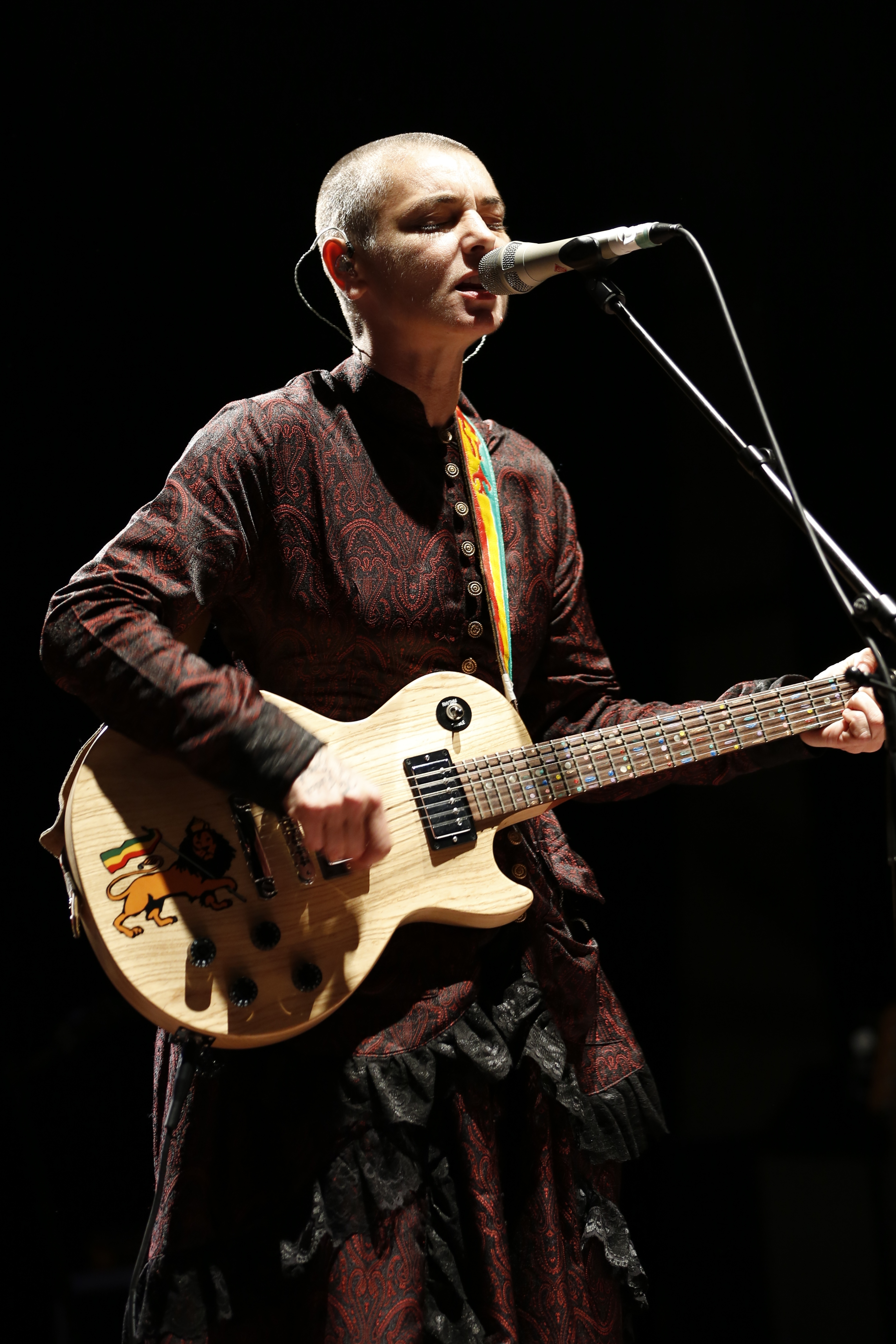
Sinéad O'Connor was the inaugural winner in 1991.

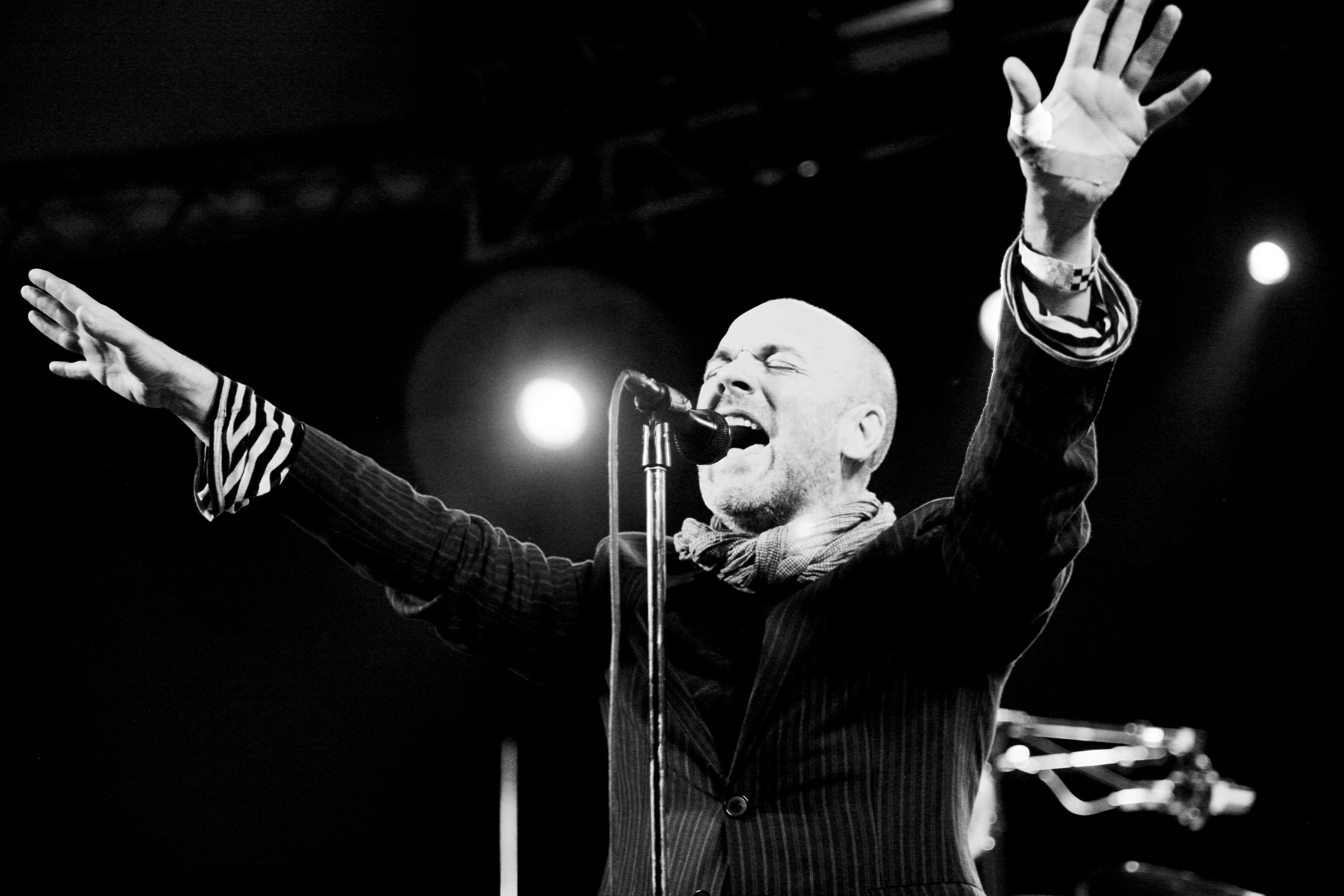
Michael Stipe of 1992 award winner R.E.M.

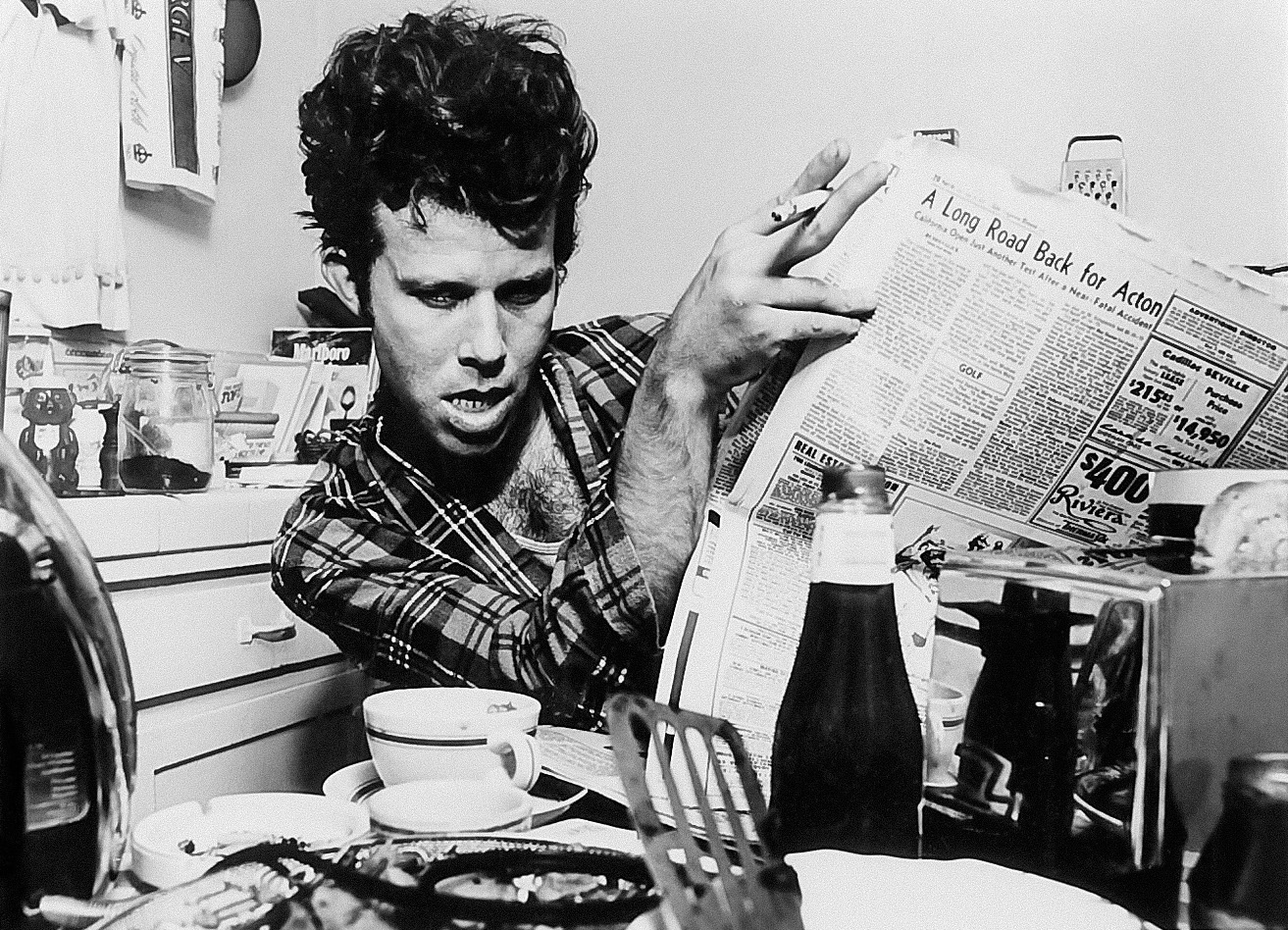
1993 award winner Tom Waits

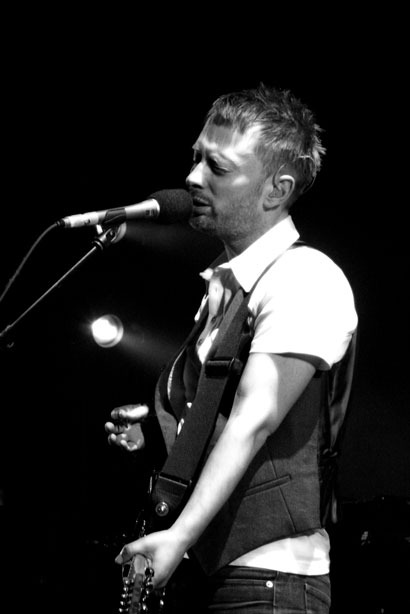
Thom Yorke of the three-time award-winning band Radiohead.

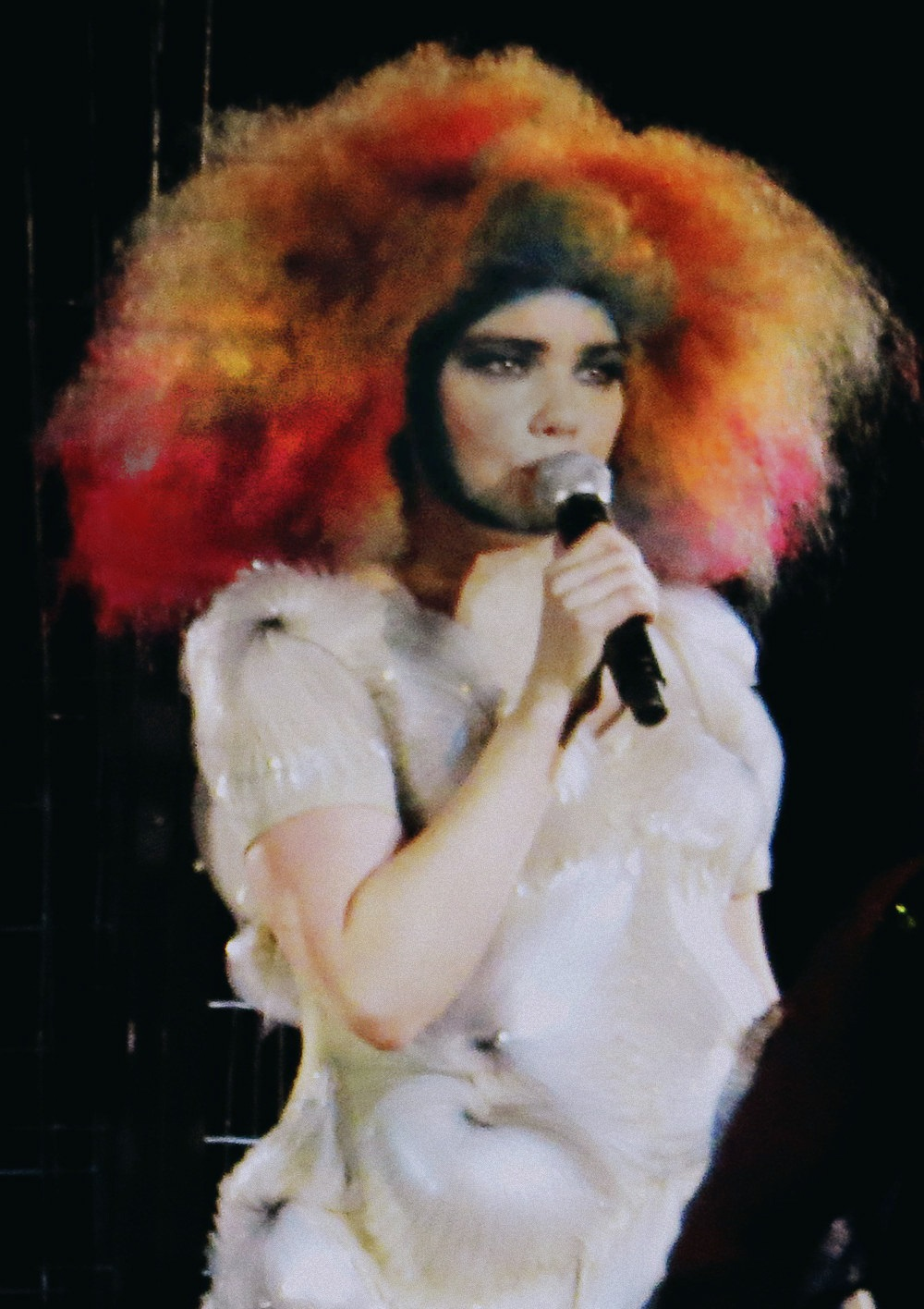
Björk has been nominated a record nine times.

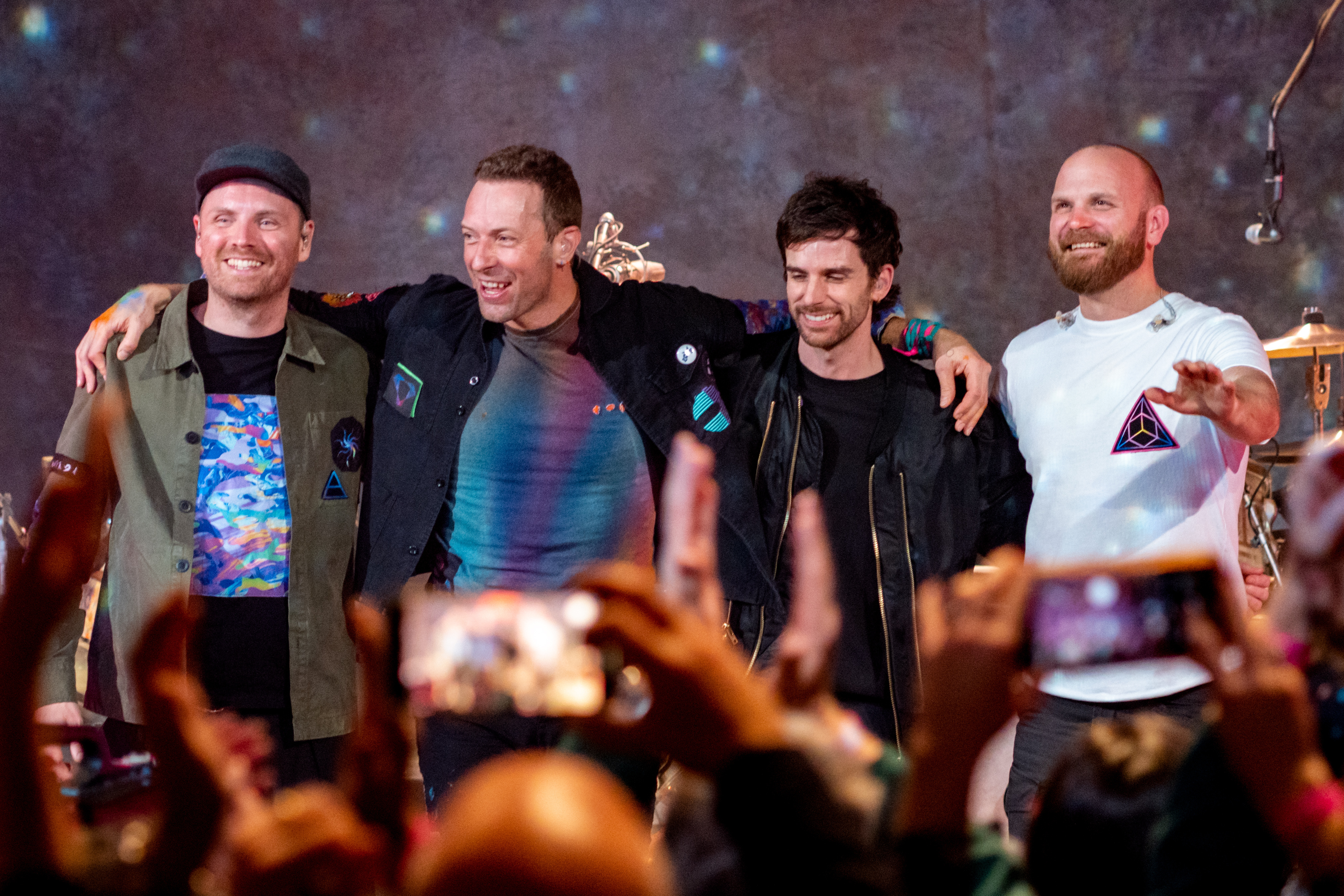
Two-time award-winning band Coldplay.

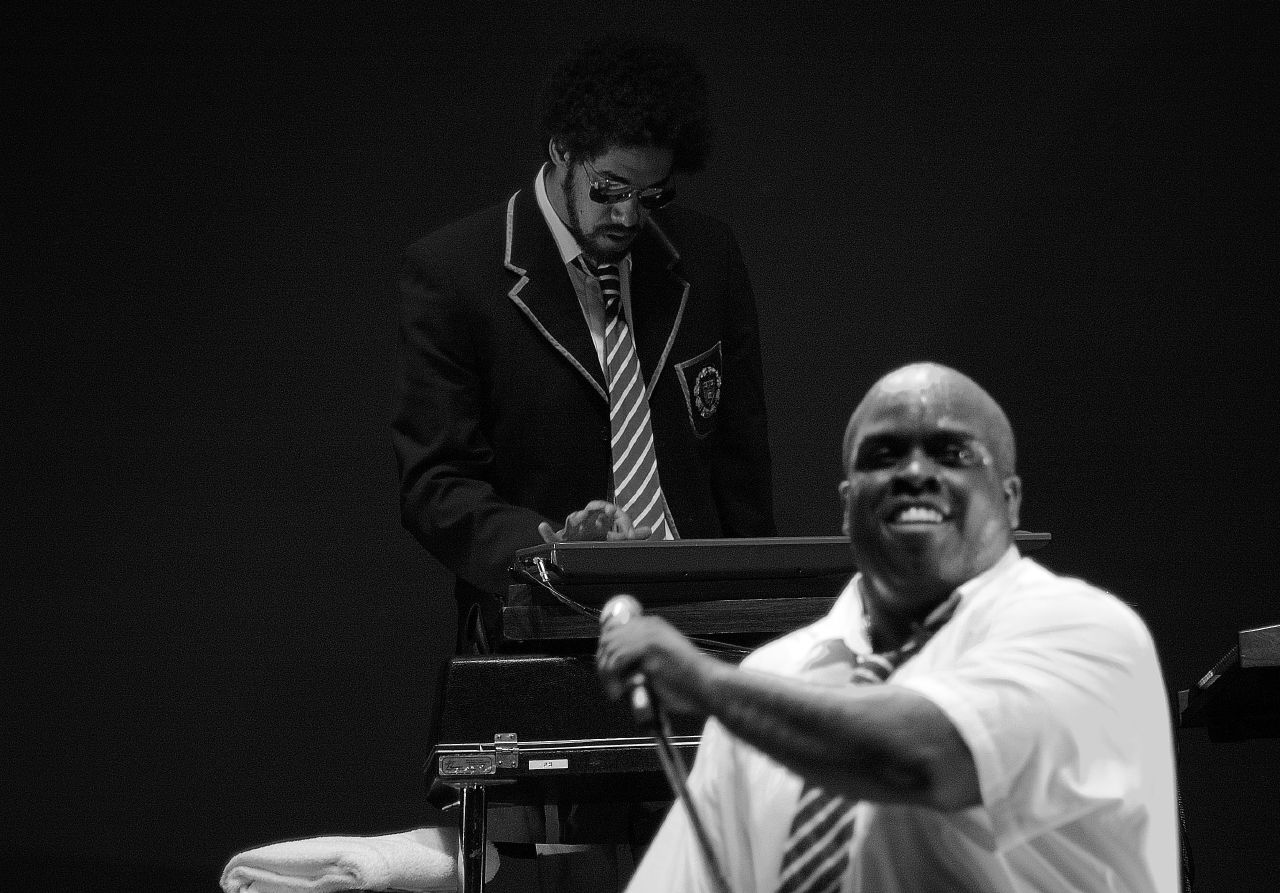
2007 winners Gnarls Barkley.

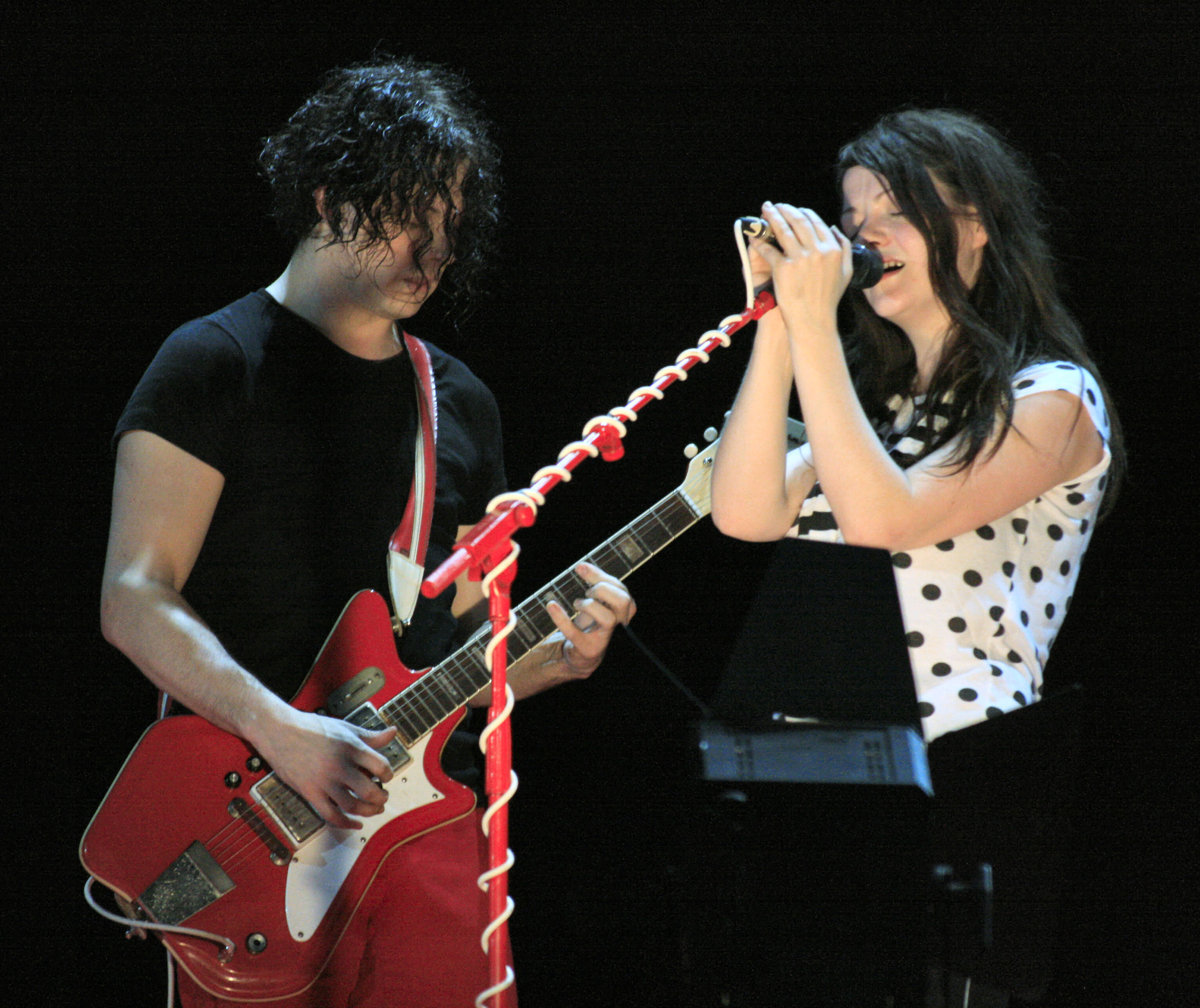
Three-time award-winning band The White Stripes.

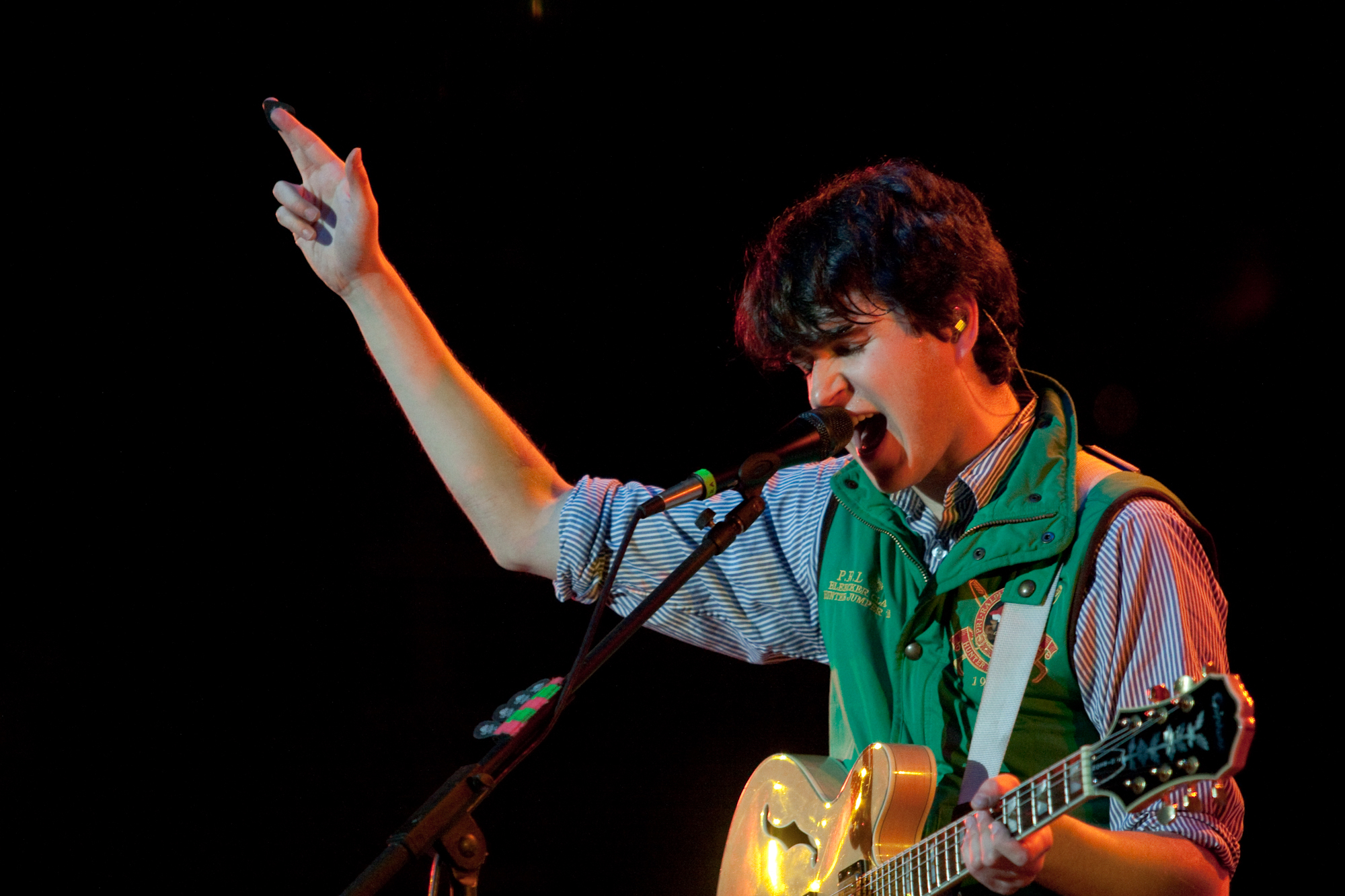
Ezra Koenig of two-time award-winner Vampire Weekend.

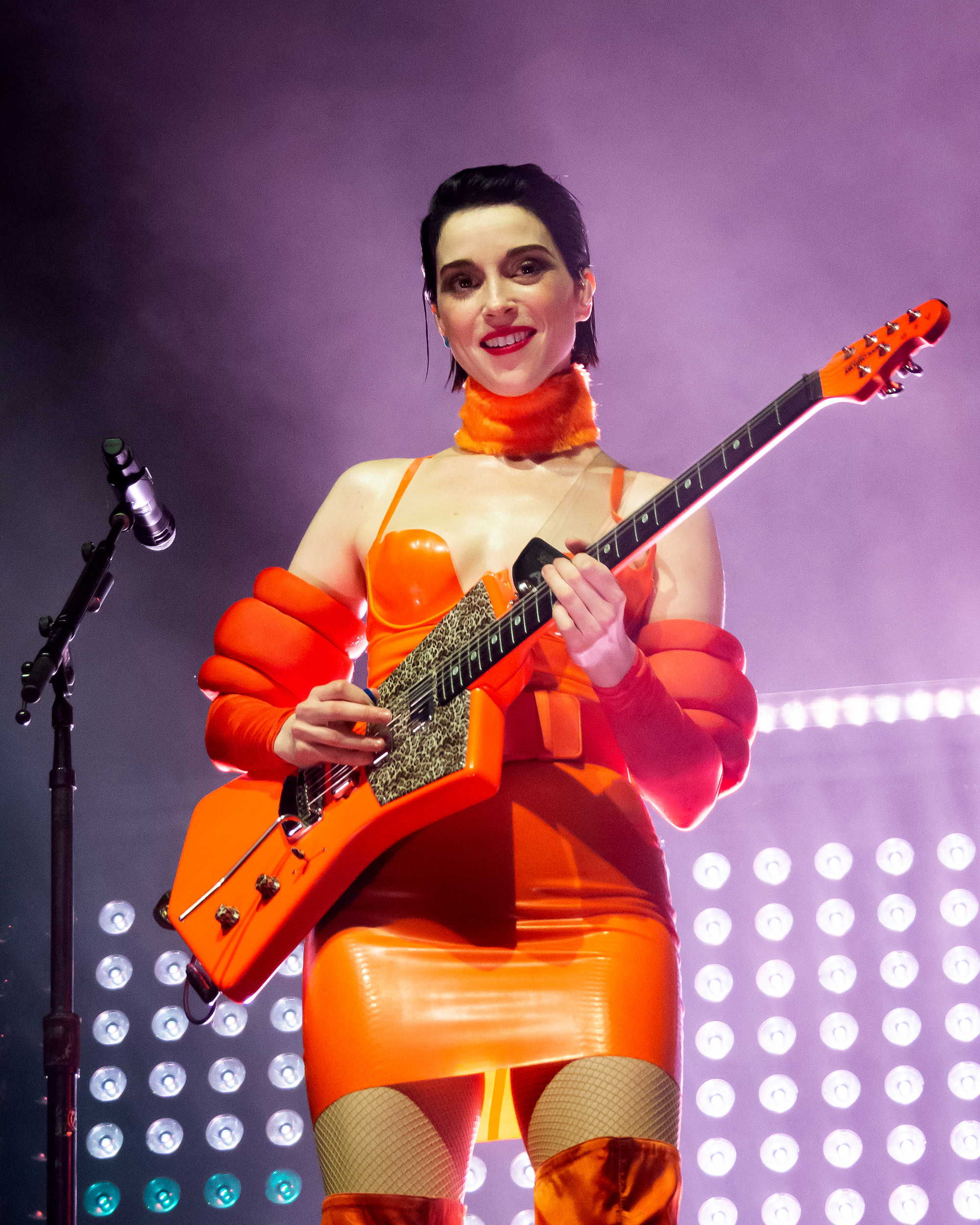
St. Vincent was the second solo female recipient when she won in 2015, and the first to win twice for solo recordings.

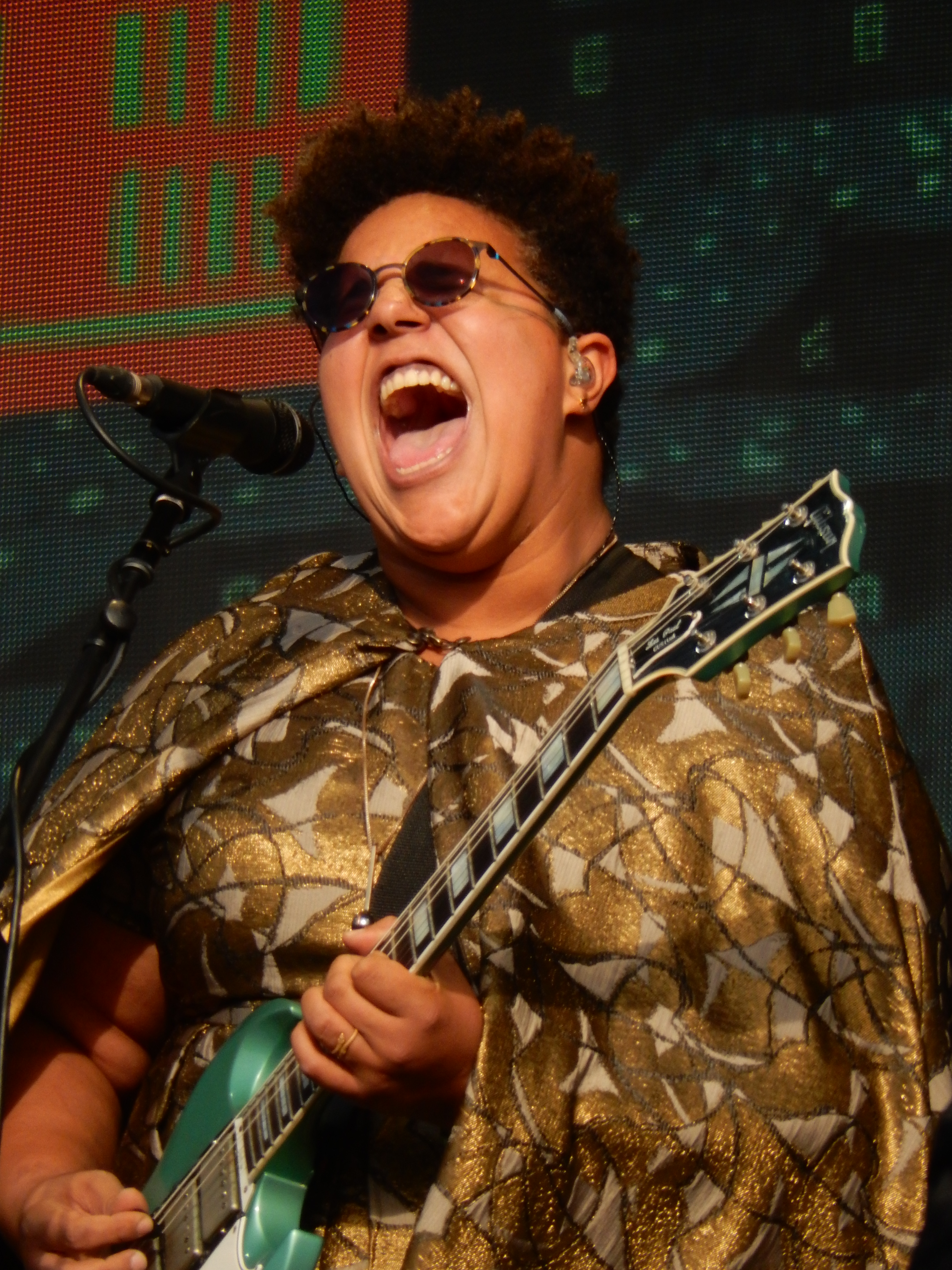
Brittany Howard of 2016 award winner Alabama Shakes.

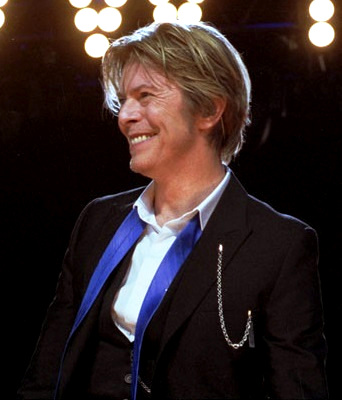
2017 award winner David Bowie.

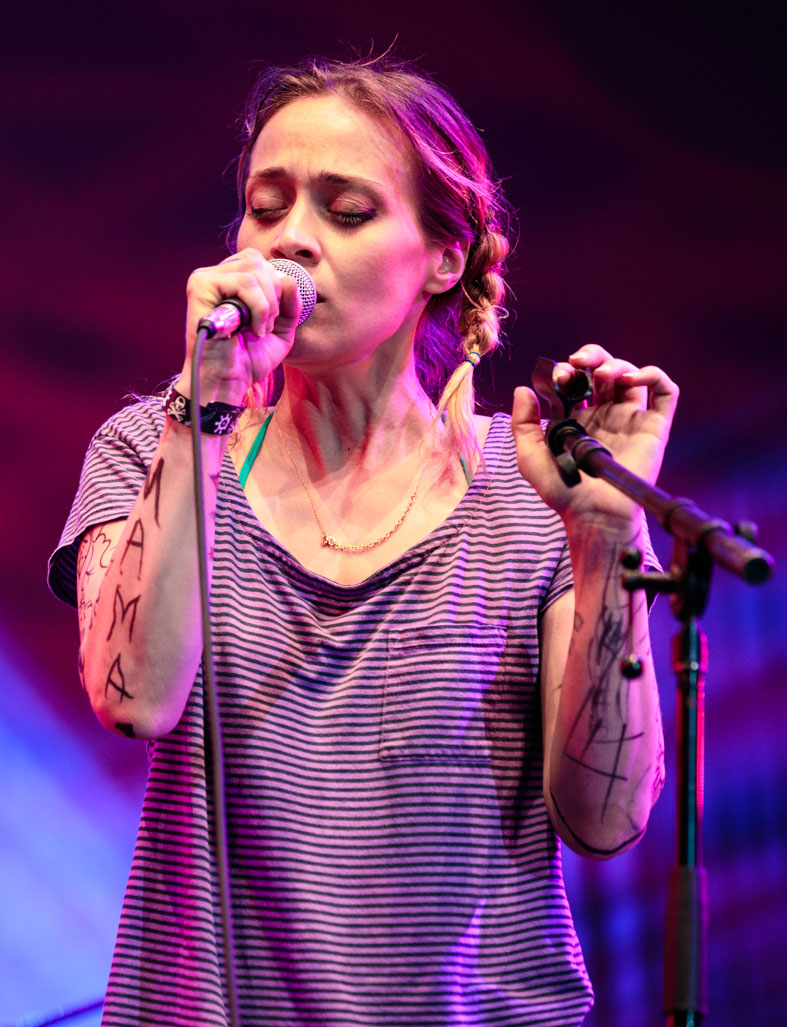
2021 award winner Fiona Apple.

=== 1990s ===
Year	Work	Artist
1991	I Do Not Want What I Haven't Got	Sinéad O'Connor
1991	All Shook Down	The Replacements
1991	Goodbye Jumbo	World Party
1991	The Sensual World	Kate Bush
1991	Strange Angels	Laurie Anderson
1992	Out of Time	R.E.M.
1992	Doubt	Jesus Jones
1992	Mighty Like a Rose	Elvis Costello
1992	Nevermind	Nirvana
1992	Rumor and Sigh	Richard Thompson
1993	Bone Machine	Tom Waits
1993	Good Stuff	The B-52s
1993	Nonsuch	XTC
1993	Wish	The Cure
1993	Your Arsenal	Morrissey
1994	Zooropa	U2
1994	Automatic for the People	R.E.M.
1994	In Utero	Nirvana
1994	Siamese Dream	The Smashing Pumpkins
1994	Star	Belly
1995	Dookie	Green Day
1995	The Downward Spiral	Nine Inch Nails
1995	Fumbling Towards Ecstasy	Sarah McLachlan
1995	God Shuffled His Feet	Crash Test Dummies
1995	Under the Pink	Tori Amos
1996	MTV Unplugged in New York	Nirvana
1996	Foo Fighters	Foo Fighters
1996	Post	Björk
1996	The Presidents of the United States of America	The Presidents of the United States of America
1996	To Bring You My Love	PJ Harvey
1997	Odelay	Beck
1997	Boys for Pele	Tori Amos
1997	The Burdens of Being Upright	Tracy Bonham
1997	Mellon Collie and the Infinite Sadness	The Smashing Pumpkins
1997	New Adventures in Hi-Fi	R.E.M.
1998	OK Computer	Radiohead
1998	Dig Your Own Hole	The Chemical Brothers
1998	Earthling	David Bowie
1998	The Fat of the Land	The Prodigy
1998	Homogenic	Björk
1999	Hello Nasty	Beastie Boys
1999	Adore	The Smashing Pumpkins
1999	Airbag/How Am I Driving?	Radiohead
1999	From the Choirgirl Hotel	Tori Amos
1999	Is This Desire?	PJ Harvey

=== 2000s ===
Year	Work	Artist
2000	Mutations	Beck
2000	The Fragile	Nine Inch Nails
2000	Play	Moby
2000	To Venus and Back	Tori Amos
2000	You've Come a Long Way, Baby	Fatboy Slim
2001	Kid A	Radiohead
2001	Bloodflowers	The Cure
2001	Liverpool Sound Collage	Paul McCartney
2001	Midnite Vultures	Beck
2001	When the Pawn...	Fiona Apple
2002	Parachutes	Coldplay
2002	Amnesiac	Radiohead
2002	Halfway Between the Gutter and the Stars	Fatboy Slim
2002	Strange Little Girls	Tori Amos
2002	Vespertine	Björk
2003	A Rush of Blood to the Head	Coldplay
2003	Behind the Music	The Soundtrack of Our Lives
2003	Cruel Smile	Elvis Costello and the Imposters
2003	Sea Change	Beck
2003	Walking with Thee	Clinic
2004	Elephant	The White Stripes
2004	( )	Sigur Rós
2004	Fever to Tell	Yeah Yeah Yeahs
2004	Fight Test	The Flaming Lips
2004	Hail to the Thief	Radiohead
2005	A Ghost Is Born	Wilco
2005	Franz Ferdinand	Franz Ferdinand
2005	Good News for People Who Love Bad News	Modest Mouse
2005	Medúlla	Björk
2005	Uh Huh Her	PJ Harvey
2006	Get Behind Me Satan	The White Stripes
2006	Funeral	Arcade Fire
2006	Guero	Beck
2006	Plans	Death Cab for Cutie
2006	You Could Have It So Much Better	Franz Ferdinand
2007	St. Elsewhere	Gnarls Barkley
2007	At War with the Mystics	The Flaming Lips
2007	The Eraser	Thom Yorke
2007	Show Your Bones	Yeah Yeah Yeahs
2007	Whatever People Say I Am, That's What I'm Not	Arctic Monkeys
2008	Icky Thump	The White Stripes
2008	Alright, Still	Lily Allen
2008	Neon Bible	Arcade Fire
2008	Volta	Björk
2008	Wincing the Night Away	The Shins
2009	In Rainbows	Radiohead
2009	Evil Urges	My Morning Jacket
2009	Modern Guilt	Beck
2009	Narrow Stairs	Death Cab for Cutie
2009	The Odd Couple	Gnarls Barkley

=== 2010s ===
Year	Work	Artist
2010	Wolfgang Amadeus Phoenix	Phoenix
2010	Everything That Happens Will Happen Today	David Byrne and Brian Eno
2010	It's Blitz!	Yeah Yeah Yeahs
2010	The Open Door EP	Death Cab for Cutie
2010	Sounds of the Universe	Depeche Mode
2011	Brothers	The Black Keys
2011	Broken Bells	Broken Bells
2011	Contra	Vampire Weekend
2011	Infinite Arms	Band of Horses
2011	The Suburbs	Arcade Fire
2012	Bon Iver	Bon Iver
2012	Circuital	My Morning Jacket
2012	Codes and Keys	Death Cab for Cutie
2012	The King of Limbs	Radiohead
2012	Torches	Foster the People
2013	Making Mirrors	Gotye
2013	Bad as Me	Tom Waits
2013	Biophilia	Björk
2013	Hurry Up, We're Dreaming	M83
2013	The Idler Wheel...	Fiona Apple
2014	Modern Vampires of the City	Vampire Weekend
2014	Hesitation Marks	Nine Inch Nails
2014	Lonerism	Tame Impala
2014	Trouble Will Find Me	The National
2014	The Worse Things Get, the Harder I Fight, the Harder I Fight, the More I Love You	Neko Case
2015	St. Vincent	St. Vincent
2015	Lazaretto	Jack White
2015	Melophobia	Cage the Elephant
2015	Reflektor	Arcade Fire
2015	This Is All Yours	Alt-J
2016	Sound & Color	Alabama Shakes
2016	Currents	Tame Impala
2016	Star Wars	Wilco
2016	Vulnicura	Björk
2016	The Waterfall	My Morning Jacket
2017	Blackstar	David Bowie
2017	22, A Million	Bon Iver
2017	The Hope Six Demolition Project	PJ Harvey
2017	A Moon Shaped Pool	Radiohead
2017	Post Pop Depression	Iggy Pop
2018	Sleep Well Beast	The National
2018	American Dream	LCD Soundsystem
2018	Everything Now	Arcade Fire
2018	Humanz	Gorillaz
2018	Pure Comedy	Father John Misty
2019	Colors	Beck
2019	American Utopia	David Byrne
2019	Masseduction	St. Vincent
2019	Tranquility Base Hotel & Casino	Arctic Monkeys
2019	Utopia	Björk

=== 2020s ===
Year	Work	Artist
2020	Father of the Bride	Vampire Weekend
2020	Anima	Thom Yorke
2020	Assume Form	James Blake
2020	I, I	Bon Iver
2020	U.F.O.F.	Big Thief
2021	Fetch the Bolt Cutters	Fiona Apple
2021	Hyperspace	Beck
2021	Jaime	Brittany Howard
2021	Punisher	Phoebe Bridgers
2021	The Slow Rush	Tame Impala
2022	Daddy's Home	St. Vincent
2022	Collapsed in Sunbeams	Arlo Parks
2022	If I Can't Have Love, I Want Power	Halsey
2022	Jubilee	Japanese Breakfast
2022	Shore	Fleet Foxes
2023	Wet Leg	Wet Leg
2023	Cool It Down	Yeah Yeah Yeahs
2023	Dragon New Warm Mountain I Believe in You	Big Thief
2023	Fossora	Björk
2023	We	Arcade Fire
2024	The Record	Boygenius
2024	The Car	Arctic Monkeys
2024	Cracker Island	Gorillaz
2024	Did You Know That There's a Tunnel Under Ocean Blvd	Lana Del Rey
2024	I Inside the Old Year Dying	PJ Harvey
2025	All Born Screaming	St. Vincent
2025	Charm	Clairo
2025	The Collective	Kim Gordon
2025	What Now	Brittany Howard
2025	Wild God	Nick Cave and the Bad Seeds
2026	Songs of a Lost World	The Cure
2026	Don't Tap the Glass	Tyler, the Creator
2026	Ego Death at a Bachelorette Party	Hayley Williams
2026	Moisturizer	Wet Leg
2026	Sable, Fable	Bon Iver
2027	Getting Killed	Geese
2027	I Must Be Dreaming	Alabama Shakes
2027	Lost Weekend	Phoebe Bridgers
2027	Lux (Complete Works)	Rosalía
2027	The Mountain	Gorillaz
2027	Music, Fashion, Film	Charli XCX

^{^[I]} Each year is linked to the article about the Grammy Awards held that year.

== Artists with multiple wins ==
3 wins

- Beck
- Radiohead
- The White Stripes
- St. Vincent

2 wins

- Coldplay
- Vampire Weekend

== Artists with multiple nominations ==
9 nominations

- Björk

8 nominations

- Beck
- Radiohead

6 nominations

- Arcade Fire

5 nominations

- Tori Amos
- PJ Harvey

4 nominations

- Bon Iver
- Death Cab for Cutie
- St. Vincent
- Yeah Yeah Yeahs

3 nominations

- Fiona Apple
- Arctic Monkeys
- Phoebe Bridgers (1 with boygenius)
- The Cure
- Gorillaz
- My Morning Jacket
- Nine Inch Nails
- Nirvana
- R.E.M.
- The Smashing Pumpkins
- Tame Impala
- Vampire Weekend
- The White Stripes

2 nominations

- Big Thief
- David Bowie
- David Byrne
- Coldplay
- Elvis Costello
- Fatboy Slim
- The Flaming Lips
- Franz Ferdinand
- Gnarls Barkley
- Brittany Howard
- The National
- Thom Yorke
- Tom Waits
- Wet Leg
- Wilco

== See also ==
- Independent music
- List of alternative rock artists
