= Sound & Color =

2015 studio album by Alabama Shakes

- Standard edition cover (Note: The 2021 deluxe edition cover features the text in shades of pink and orange.)

Studio album by Alabama Shakes
- Released: April 17, 2015
- Studios: Sound Emporium (Nashville, Tennessee); United Recording (Los Angeles)
- Genres: Soul; Southern rock
- Length: 47:26
- Label: ATO
- Producers: Blake Mills; Alabama Shakes

Alabama Shakes chronology
Boys & Girls (2012)	Sound & Color (2015)	I Must Be Dreaming (2026)

Singles from Sound & Color
- 1. "Don't Wanna Fight" Released: February 10, 2015; 2. "Gimme All Your Love" Released: February 2015; 3. "Future People" Released: March 19, 2015; 4. "Sound & Color" Released: September 21, 2015

Sound & Color is the second studio album by American band Alabama Shakes, released on April 17, 2015, by ATO Records.

The album debuted at number one on the Billboard 200 in the U.S., giving the band their first chart-topper; globally, the album hit the top ten in Australia, the Netherlands, Switzerland, and the United Kingdom. It was also a critical success and was nominated for six Grammy Awards, winning four for Best Alternative Music Album, Best Engineered Album, Non-Classical, as well as Best Rock Performance and Best Rock Song for "Don't Wanna Fight". It spawned four singles; "Don't Wanna Fight" was the most successful, peaking at number two on Billboard's Adult Alternative Songs chart.

== Background ==
Alabama Shakes began recording their second album in late 2013. The group listened to anything and everything for influence, without regard for its public reception in the end. They spent over a year in the studio, with no clear end-goal, as they had not written any new songs due to their exhaustive touring schedule. Sound & Color is steeped in several different genres, touching on shoegaze to bands such as MC5.

In promotion of Sound & Color, the group appeared on Saturday Night Live on February 28, 2015; they performed the singles "Gimme All Your Love" and "Don't Wanna Fight".

The title song, "Sound & Color", was used in the final episode of the first season of Mr. Robot.

In 2017, the song "This Feeling" was used in the first season of the HBO miniseries Big Little Lies, and in 2019, it was used in the end scene of the final episode of the British TV show Fleabag. The song "Sound & Color" was used in the end credits of the 2019 film Waves, directed by Trey Edward Shults and produced by A24. "Don't Wanna Fight" was used in the 2019 film Just Mercy.

A deluxe edition of the album was released on October 29, 2021, featuring three B-sides and four live recordings. The live recording of "Future People" was released as a promotional single on September 29, 2021.

== Composition ==
"A genuine Americana love letter", Sound & Color is rooted in Southern rock and soul music. It has also been noted for making roots rock "a surprise again". Yet despite being rooted in these genres, Sound & Color includes some of the quartet's most eclectic and experimental songs to date. It features sounds of country, blues, funk, garage punk, punk rock, swamp rock, and talking blues. Its songs have been compared to musicians like Erykah Badu and Curtis Mayfield and bands like MC5 and the Strokes.

The "engrossing" "Guess Who" explores jazz sounds. The "ballistic" "The Greatest" takes on cowpunk like that of the Meat Puppets, as well as hardcore punk, new wave, proto-punk, and "no-frills" rock and roll. A "fun little bash" is made out of the fusion of grunge and funk on "Shoegaze". Both songs have also been noted as garage rock.

Sound & Color digs its heels into more psychedelia-based stylings, from the "slow-burning" space rock of "Dunes" to the "celestial" psychedelic funk of "Future People". "Gemini", the record's longest song, changes between "smooth R&B and stoner-desert rock" while journeying into "zero-gravity" funk.

== Commercial performance ==
The album debuted atop the US Billboard 200 chart, earning 97,000 album-equivalent units (91,000 copies of traditional album sales) in its first week, in the week ending April 26, 2015, making it the band's first number one album. The album has sold 306,000 copies in the US as of December 2015.

== Critical reception ==
Professional ratings
Aggregate scores
Source	Rating
AnyDecentMusic?	7.8/10
Metacritic	80/100
Review scores
Source	Rating
AllMusic	4/5 stars
Chicago Tribune	3/4 stars
The Daily Telegraph	5/5 stars
Entertainment Weekly	A−
The Guardian	3/5 stars
The Independent	4/5 stars
NME	8/10
Pitchfork	8.1/10
Rolling Stone	3.5/5 stars
Spin	7/10

Upon its release, Sound & Color received positive reviews. At the review aggregator Metacritic, the album currently holds a score of 80 based on 30 critics, indicating "generally favorable reviews". Writing for Exclaim!, Andrea Warner called the record a "deliberately weird record, but authentically weird; it's chaotic yet cohesive, full of sound, colour and unshakable vision." Barry Nicholson of NME compared it favorably to the band's first album, writing, "whereas their debut was cast in sepia hues and downhome earthiness, its follow-up is a more kaleidoscopic affair."

=== Accolades ===
Sound & Color garnered six nominations at the 58th Annual Grammy Awards; it was nominated for the Album of the Year, marking the group's first nomination in the category. The album was also nominated for Grammy Award for Producer of the Year, Non-Classical (Blake Mills), and won Best Alternative Music Album, Best Engineered Album, Non-Classical (Shawn Everett and Bob Ludwig). "Don't Wanna Fight" won for Best Rock Performance and Best Rock Song.

==== Semester-end lists ====
Country	Publication	Work	List	Rank	Ref.
US	Paste	Sound & Color	The 25 Best Albums of 2015 (So Far)	6	
US	Paste	"Gimme All Your Love"	The 25 Best Songs of 2015 (So Far)	9	

==== Year-end lists ====
Country	Publication	List	Rank	Ref.
US	Billboard	25 Best Albums of 2015	7	
US	Complex	The Best Albums of 2015	29	
US	Consequence	Top 50 Albums of 2015	36	
US	Entertainment Weekly	The 40 Best Albums of 2015	13	
Canada	Exclaim!	Exclaim!'s Top 20 Pop & Rock Albums	10	
US	NPR	NPR Music's 50 Favorite Albums Of 2015	*	
US	Rolling Stone	The 50 Best Albums of 2015	37	
US	Rough Trade	Albums of the Year 2015	31	
US	The New York Times	The Best Albums of 2015 (by Jon Pareles)	7	

* denotes an unordered list

==== Decade-end lists ====
Country	Publication	List	Rank	Ref.
US	Pitchfork	The 200 Best Albums of the 2010s	138	

== Track listing ==
All lyrics are written by all band members at the time of recording, with the addition of songwriter Blake Mills on tracks 4, 7, and 11 per BMI.

No.	Title	Writer(s)	Length
1.	"Sound & Color"	Cockrell; Fogg; Howard; Johnson	3:02
2.	"Don't Wanna Fight"	Cockrell; Fogg; Howard; Johnson	3:52
3.	"Dunes"	Cockrell; Fogg; Howard; Johnson	4:17
4.	"Future People"	Cockrell; Fogg; Howard; Johnson; Blake Mills	3:21
5.	"Gimme All Your Love"	Cockrell; Fogg; Howard; Johnson	4:03
6.	"This Feeling"	Cockrell; Fogg; Howard; Johnson	4:28
7.	"Guess Who"	Cockrell; Fogg; Howard; Johnson; Mills	3:15
8.	"The Greatest"	Cockrell; Fogg; Howard; Johnson	3:49
9.	"Shoegaze"	Cockrell; Fogg; Howard; Johnson	2:59
10.	"Miss You"	Cockrell; Fogg; Howard; Johnson	3:47
11.	"Gemini"	Cockrell; Fogg; Howard; Johnson; Mills	6:35
12.	"Over My Head"	Cockrell; Fogg; Howard; Johnson	3:51
Total length:			47:19

iTunes Japan bonus track version
No.	Title	Length
13.	"Drive By Baby"	2:20
14.	"Joe"	4:00
Total length:		53:39

International bonus tracks
No.	Title	Length
13.	"Joe"	4:00
14.	"Makin' Me Itch"	2:12
Total length:		53:31

Target exclusive bonus CD
No.	Title	Length
1.	"Gimme All Your Love" (live from the Artists Den)	4:13
2.	"The Greatest" (live from the Artists Den)	3:19
3.	"Joe" (live from the Artists Den)	3:35
Total length:		11:07

2021 deluxe edition
No.	Title	Length
13.	"Drive By Baby"	2:20
14.	"Joe"	4:00
15.	"Someday"	3:19
16.	"Don't Wanna Fight" (live from Capitol Studio A)	3:59
17.	"Future People" (live from Capitol Studio A)	3:29
18.	"Dunes" (live from Capitol Studio A)	3:30
19.	"Over My Head" (live from Capitol Studio A)	4:03
Total length:		71:59

== Personnel ==
Credits adapted from Sound & Color liner notes.

Alabama Shakes

- Brittany Howard − vocals (all), guitar (2–12), vibraphone (1, 7, 11), percussion (4, 6, 12), keyboards (11, 12); string arrangement (1)
- Heath Fogg − guitar (all), percussion (6, 12)
- Zac Cockrell − bass (all), percussion (6, 7, 12)
- Steve Johnson − drums (all), percussion (2–4, 6, 12)

Additional musicians

- Ben Tanner − keyboards (1, 3–12), vibraphone (1), percussion (12)
- Paul Horton − keyboards (11)
- Rob Moose − string arrangements (1, 3, 6, 7)

Production

- Alabama Shakes − production
- Blake Mills − production, percussion (2, 3, 12), guitar (8), vibraphone (10)
- Bob Ludwig − mastering
- Shawn Everett − mixing, engineering

== Charts ==
=== Weekly charts ===
Chart (2015–2021)	Peak position
Australian Albums (ARIA)	6
Austrian Albums (Ö3 Austria)	52
Belgian Albums (Ultratop Flanders)	12
Belgian Albums (Ultratop Wallonia)	40
Canadian Albums (Billboard)	1
Dutch Albums (Album Top 100)	4
French Albums (SNEP)	41
German Albums (Offizielle Top 100)	28
Irish Albums (IRMA)	12
New Zealand Albums (RMNZ)	15
Portuguese Albums (AFP)	27
Scottish Albums (Official Charts)	4
Spanish Albums (Promusicae)	46
Swedish Albums (Sverigetopplistan)	37
Swiss Albums (Schweizer Hitparade)	10
UK Albums (Official Charts)	6
UK Album Downloads (Official Charts)	6
UK Independent Albums (Official Charts)	1
US Billboard 200	1
US Top Alternative Albums (Billboard)	1
US Independent Albums (Billboard)	1
US Top Rock Albums (Billboard)	1
US Americana/Folk Albums (Billboard)	6

=== Year-end charts ===
Chart (2015)	Position
Belgian Albums (Ultratop Flanders)	71
US Billboard 200	92
US Top Alternative Albums (Billboard)	8
US Independent Albums (Billboard)	2
US Top Rock Albums (Billboard)	11

Chart (2016)	Position
US Billboard 200	169
US Top Alternative Albums (Billboard)	16
US Independent Albums (Billboard)	7
US Top Rock Albums (Billboard)	15

== Certifications ==
Region	Certification	Certified units/sales
Canada (Music Canada)	Gold	40,000^{^}
New Zealand (RMNZ)	Gold	7,500^{‡}
United Kingdom (BPI)	Silver	60,000^{‡}
United States (RIAA)	Platinum	1,000,000^{‡}
^{^} Shipments figures based on certification alone.^{‡} Sales+streaming figures based on certification alone.
