= Future People =

Single by Alabama Shakes

from the album Sound & Color
- B-side: "Drive by Baby"
- Released: March 19, 2015
- Recorded: 2015
- Genre: Blues rock; psychedelic soul
- Length: 3:22
- Label: ATO (US); MapleMusic (Canada); Rough Trade (UK)
- Songwriters: Brittany Howard; Blake Mills
- Producers: Alabama Shakes; Blake Mills

Alabama Shakes singles chronology
"Gimme All Your Love" (2015)	"Future People" (2015)	"Sound & Color" (2015)

Music video
- "Future People" on YouTube

"Future People" is a song performed by American rock band Alabama Shakes, issued as the third single from the band's second studio album Sound & Color. Co-produced by the band and co-written by lead singer Brittany Howard, the song has reached #37 on the Billboard rock chart.

== Critical reception ==
"Future People" has received positive reviews from critics. Alicia Kort of Music Times complimented lead singer Brittany Howard's falsetto on the track and used it as an example on how the parent album blended different styles via the music. Kitty Empire of The Observer echoed this opinion while also complimenting the song's "sultry soul-rock groove".

== Music video ==
The music video for "Future People" was released on August 10, 2015. Directed by Danny Clinch, the video shows the band performing the song live at Capitol Studio A in Hollywood. Alternatively, a video featuring the song's audio became available in March 2015.

== Chart positions ==
Chart (2015)	Peak position
US Hot Rock & Alternative Songs (Billboard)	37
US Adult Alternative Airplay (Billboard)	24
