= Grammy Award for Best Rock Performance =

Music award

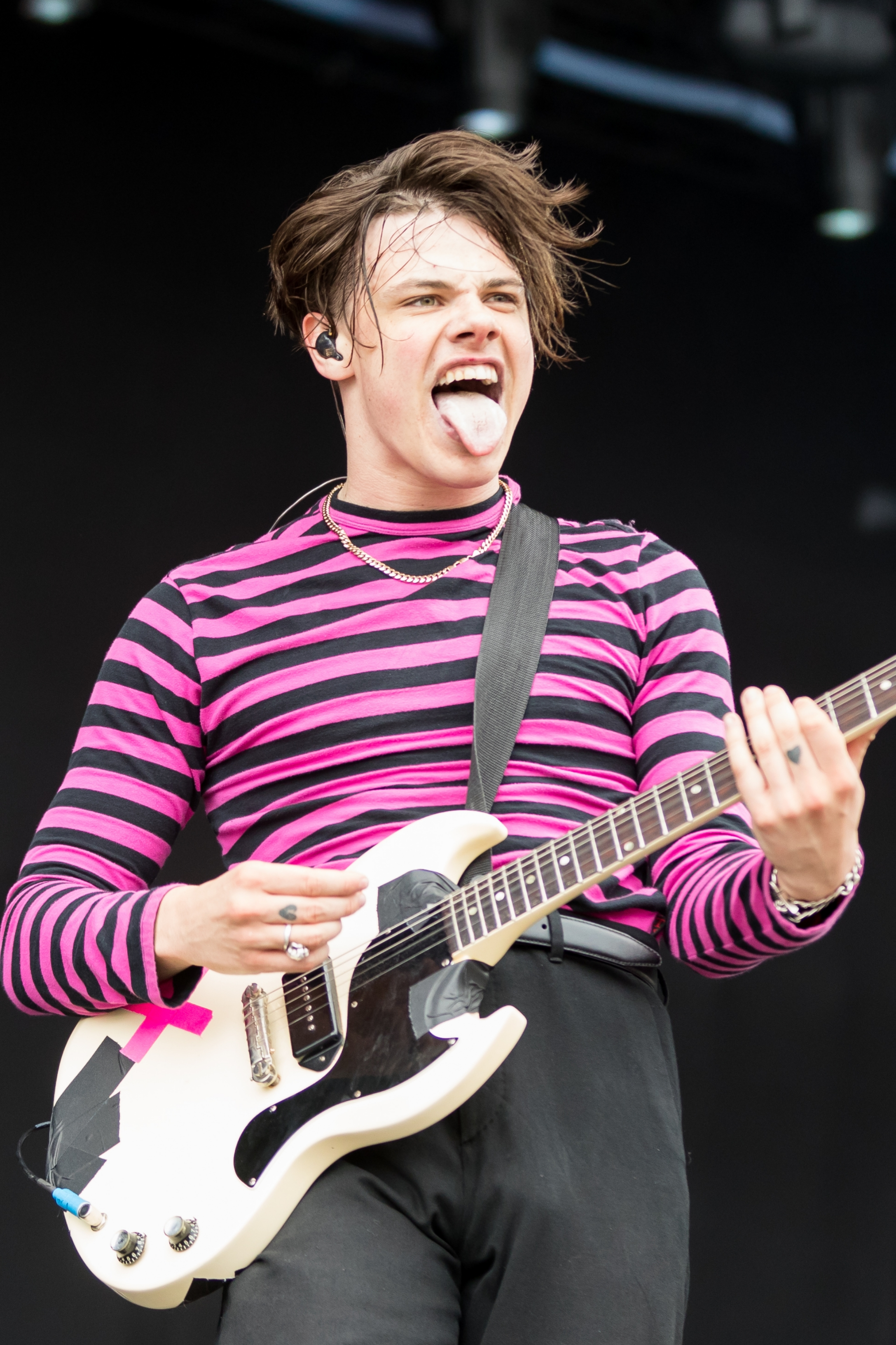
- "Changes (Live From Villa Park) Back to the Beginning" by Yungblud featuring Nuno Bettencourt, Frank Bello, Adam Wakeman and II of Sleep Token is the most recent recipient
- Awarded for: quality vocal or instrumental rock recordings
- Country: United States
- Presented by: National Academy of Recording Arts and Sciences
- First award: 2012
- Currently held by: Yungblud featuring Nuno Bettencourt, Frank Bello, Adam Wakeman and II of Sleep Token — "Changes (Live From Villa Park) Back to the Beginning" (2026)
- Website: grammy.com

The Grammy Award for Best Rock Performance is an award presented at the Grammy Awards, a ceremony that was established in 1958 and originally called the Gramophone Awards. According to the 54th Grammy Awards description guide it is designed for solo, duo/groups or collaborative (vocal or instrumental) rock recordings and is limited to singles or tracks only.

This award combines the previous categories for Best Solo Rock Vocal Performance, Best Rock Performance by a Duo or Group with Vocal and Best Rock Instrumental Performance. The restructuring of these categories was a result of the Recording Academy's wish to decrease the list of categories and awards and to eliminate the distinctions between solo and duo/groups performances. The Academy argued that any distinction between these performances is difficult to make, as "four-fifths of rock acts are groups, and even solo rock acts tend to be backed by a band".

The award goes to the artist. The producer, engineer and songwriter can apply for a Winners Certificate.

From 2014, this category has also included hard rock performances that were previously screened in the Best Hard Rock Performance and Best Hard Rock/Metal Performance categories, which are now defunct.

== Recipients ==
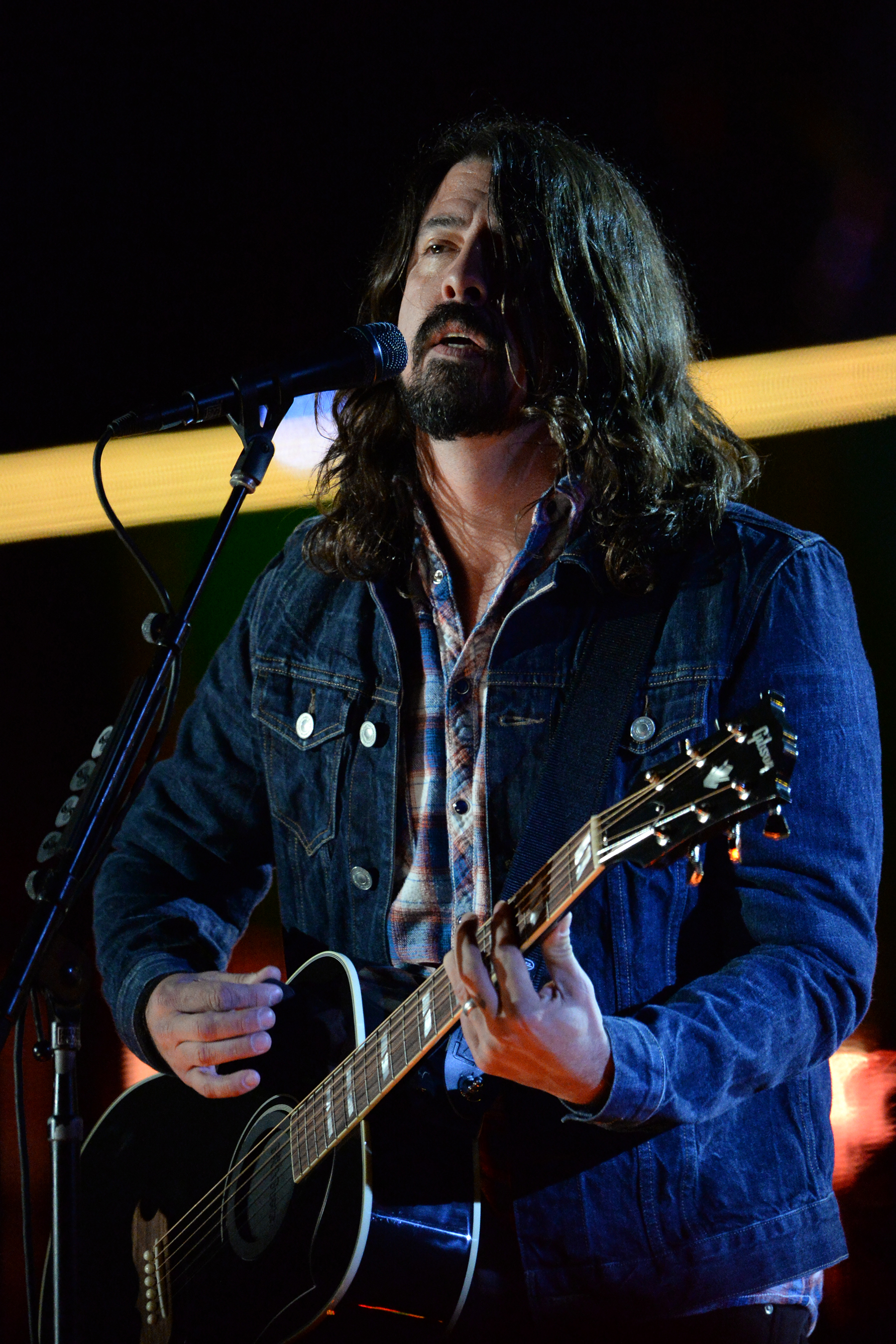
Dave Grohl and the Foo Fighters were the inaugural winners of the award.

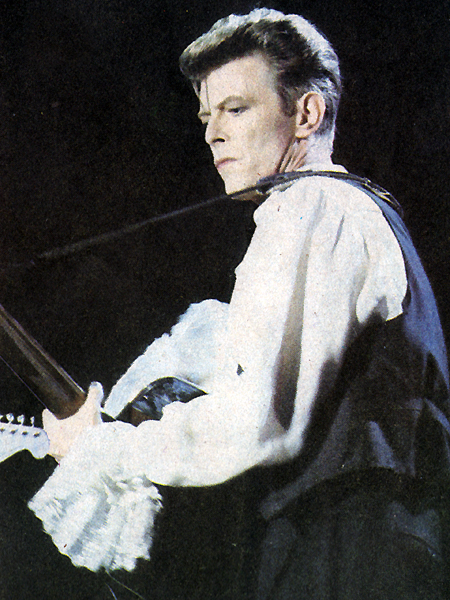
David Bowie was posthumously honoured in 2017.

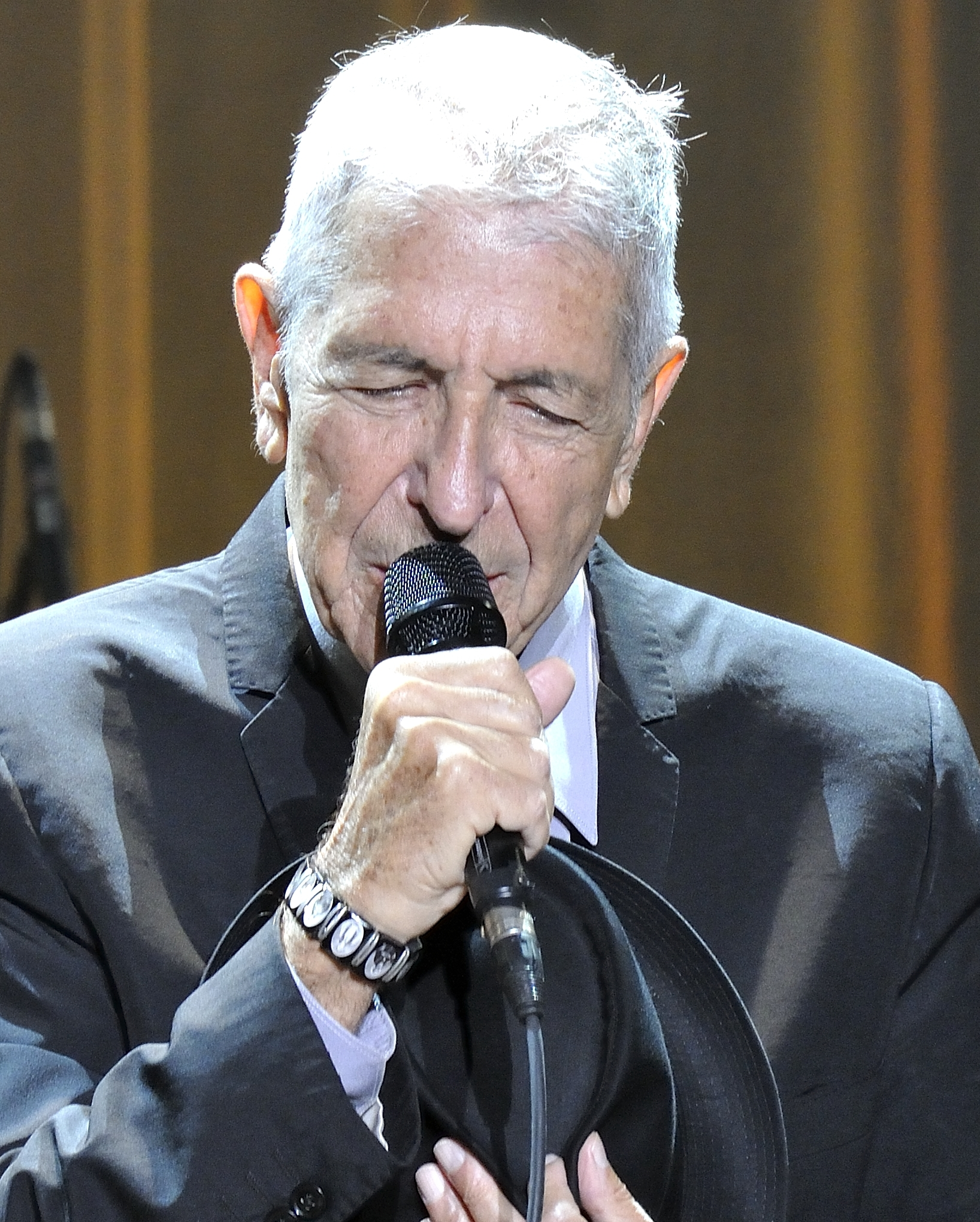
Leonard Cohen posthumously won in 2018.

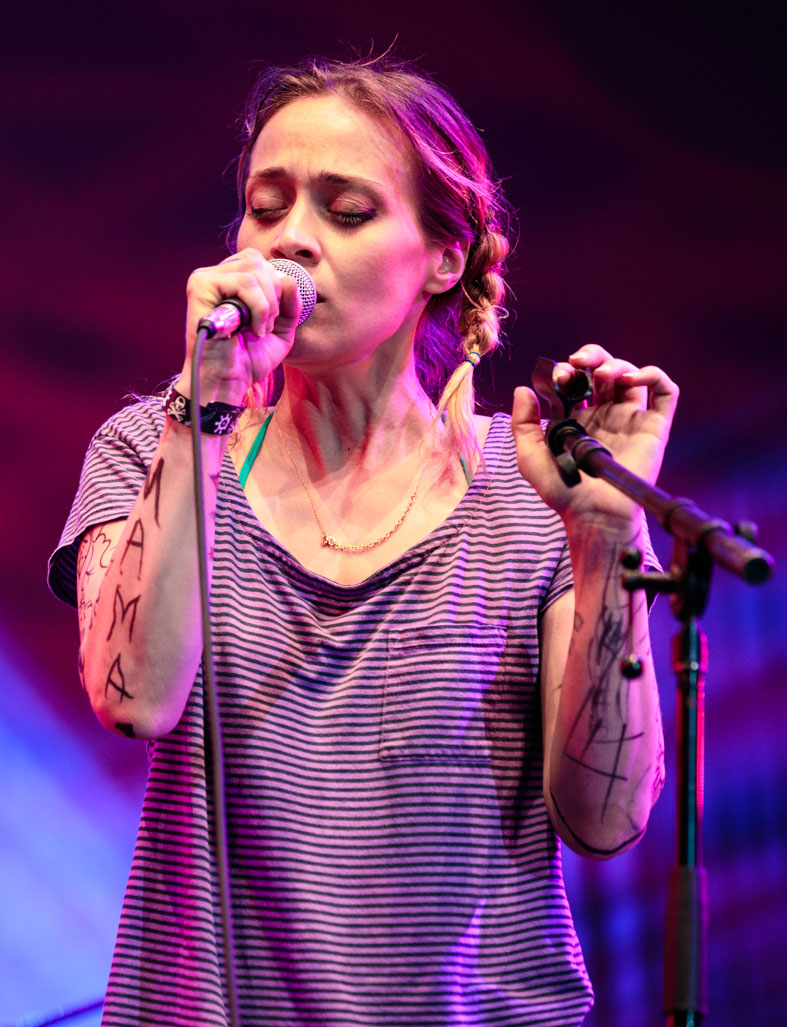
2021 recipient Fiona Apple was the first solo female artist to win this category, in a line-up featuring only female performers for the first time. She had previously won the Best Female Rock Vocal Performance trophy with "Criminal" in 1998.

=== 2010s ===
Year	Artist	Work
2012
2012	Foo Fighters	"Walk"
2012	Coldplay	"Every Teardrop Is a Waterfall"
2012	The Decemberists	"Down by the Water"
2012	Mumford & Sons	"The Cave"
2012	Radiohead	"Lotus Flower"
2013
2013	The Black Keys	"Lonely Boy"
2013	Alabama Shakes	"Hold On"
2013	Coldplay	"Charlie Brown"
2013	Mumford & Sons	"I Will Wait"
2013	Bruce Springsteen	"We Take Care of Our Own"
2014
2014	Imagine Dragons	"Radioactive"
2014	Alabama Shakes	"Always Alright"
2014	David Bowie	"The Stars (Are Out Tonight)"
2014	Led Zeppelin	"Kashmir" (Live)
2014	Queens of the Stone Age	"My God Is the Sun"
2014	Jack White	"I'm Shakin'"
2015
2015	Jack White	"Lazaretto"
2015	Ryan Adams	"Gimme Something Good"
2015	Arctic Monkeys	"Do I Wanna Know?"
2015	Beck	"Blue Moon"
2015	The Black Keys	"Fever"
2016
2016	Alabama Shakes	"Don't Wanna Fight"
2016	Florence + The Machine	"What Kind of Man"
2016	Foo Fighters	"Something from Nothing"
2016	Elle King	"Ex's & Oh's"
2016	Wolf Alice	"Moaning Lisa Smile"
2017
2017	David Bowie	"Blackstar"
2017	Alabama Shakes	"Joe" (Live from Austin City Limits)
2017	Beyoncé featuring Jack White	"Don't Hurt Yourself"
2017	Disturbed	"The Sound of Silence"
2017	Twenty One Pilots	"Heathens"
2018
2018	Leonard Cohen	"You Want It Darker"
2018	Chris Cornell	"The Promise"
2018	Foo Fighters	"Run"
2018	Kaleo	"No Good"
2018	Nothing More	"Go to War"
2019
2019	Chris Cornell	"When Bad Does Good"
2019	Arctic Monkeys	"Four Out of Five"
2019	The Fever 333	"Made an America"
2019	Greta Van Fleet	"Highway Tune"
2019	Halestorm	"Uncomfortable"

=== 2020s ===
Year	Artist	Work
2020
2020	Gary Clark Jr.	"This Land"
2020	Bones UK	"Pretty Waste"
2020	Brittany Howard	"History Repeats"
2020	Karen O and Danger Mouse	"Woman"
2020	Rival Sons	"Too Bad"
2021
2021	Fiona Apple	"Shameika"
2021	Big Thief	"Not"
2021	Phoebe Bridgers	"Kyoto"
2021	Haim	"The Steps"
2021	Brittany Howard	"Stay High"
2021	Grace Potter	"Daylight"
2022
2022	Foo Fighters	"Making a Fire"
2022	AC/DC	"Shot in the Dark"
2022	Black Pumas	"Know You Better" (Live from Capitol Studio A)
2022	Chris Cornell	"Nothing Compares 2 U"
2022	Deftones	"Ohms"
2023
2023	Brandi Carlile	"Broken Horses"
2023	Bryan Adams	"So Happy It Hurts"
2023	Beck	"Old Man"
2023	The Black Keys	"Wild Child"
2023	IDLES	"Crawl!"
2023	Ozzy Osbourne featuring Jeff Beck	"Patient Number 9"
2023	Turnstile	"Holiday"
2024
2024	Boygenius	"Not Strong Enough"
2024	Arctic Monkeys	"Sculptures of Anything Goes"
2024	Black Pumas	"More Than a Love Song"
2024	Foo Fighters	"Rescued"
2024	Metallica	"Lux Æterna"
2025
2025	The Beatles	"Now and Then"
2025	The Black Keys	"Beautiful People (Stay High)"
2025	Green Day	"The American Dream Is Killing Me"
2025	Idles	"Gift Horse"
2025	Pearl Jam	"Dark Matter"
2025	St. Vincent	"Broken Man"
2026
2026	Yungblud featuring Nuno Bettencourt, Frank Bello, Adam Wakeman and II of Sleep Token	"Changes (Live from Villa Park) Back to the Beginning"
2026	Amyl and the Sniffers	"U Should Not Be Doing That"
2026	Linkin Park	"The Emptiness Machine"
2026	Turnstile	"Never Enough"
2026	Hayley Williams	"Mirtazapine"
2027
2027	Angine de Poitrine	"Sarniezz"
2027	Phoebe Bridgers	"Lost Boys"
2027	Geese	"Trinidad"
2027	Olivia Rodrigo and Robert Smith	"What's Wrong with Me"
2027	The Rolling Stones	"In the Stars"

^{^[I]} Each year is linked to the article about the Grammy Awards held that year.

== Artists with multiple nominations ==
6 nominations

- Brittany Howard (4 with Alabama Shakes)

5 nominations

- Foo Fighters

4 nominations

- Alabama Shakes
- The Black Keys

3 nominations

- Arctic Monkeys
- Phoebe Bridgers (1 with Boygenius)
- Chris Cornell
- Jack White

2 nominations

- Beck
- Black Pumas
- David Bowie
- Coldplay
- Idles
- Mumford & Sons
- Turnstile

== See also ==
- Grammy Award for Best Female Rock Vocal Performance
- Grammy Award for Best Male Rock Vocal Performance
- Grammy Award for Best Solo Rock Vocal Performance
- Grammy Award for Best Rock Performance by a Duo or Group with Vocal
- Grammy Award for Best Hard Rock Performance
- Grammy Award for Best Metal Performance
- Grammy Award for Best Rock Instrumental Performance
- Grammy Award for Best Rock Song
