= Gimme All Your Love =

Single by Alabama Shakes

from the album Sound & Color
- Released: 2015
- Genre: Blues rock; garage rock; soul
- Length: 4:03
- Label: ATO (US); MapleMusic (Canada); Rough Trade (UK)
- Songwriter: Brittany Howard
- Producers: Alabama Shakes; Blake Mills

Alabama Shakes singles chronology
"Don't Wanna Fight" (2015)	"Gimme All Your Love" (2015)	"Future People" (2015)

Music video
- "Gimme All Your Love" on YouTube

"Gimme All Your Love" is a song performed by American rock band Alabama Shakes, issued as the second single from the band's second studio album Sound & Color. Co-produced by the band and written by lead singer Brittany Howard, the song peaked at #36 on the Billboard rock chart. The band performed the song live on television for the first time on February 28, 2015, on Saturday Night Live.

== Critical reception ==
FDRMX magazine described the song as "sheer musical bliss deriving from the innermost corners of the soul".

In 2016, song's engineer Shawn Everett, won the Canadian Juno Awards for Recording Engineer of the Year for it.

== Music video ==
At the time of the album release, no official music video was created for the song. However, a video featuring the song's audio became available in February 2015. On April 5, 2016, Alabama Shakes choose the video submitted by Marie Laure Blancho and Larry Ismail out of the 101 videos submitted from 26 countries as the official video.

== Chart positions ==
Chart (2015)	Peak position
US Hot Rock & Alternative Songs (Billboard)	36
US Adult Alternative Airplay (Billboard)	25
