= Don't Wanna Fight =

Single by Alabama Shakes

from the album Sound & Color
- Released: February 10, 2015
- Genre: Blues rock; soul; funk
- Length: 3:53
- Label: ATO
- Songwriter: Brittany Howard
- Producer: Blake Mills

Alabama Shakes singles chronology
| "Hang Loose" (2013) | "Don't Wanna Fight" (2015) | "Gimme All Your Love" (2015) |

Music video
- "Don't Wanna Fight" on YouTube

"Don't Wanna Fight" is a song performed by American rock band Alabama Shakes, issued as the lead single from the band's second studio album Sound & Color. The band performed the song live for the first time on February 28, 2015 on Saturday Night Live. The song won two awards at the 58th Grammy Awards on February 15, 2016. It was also featured in a season 2 episode of the HBO comedy series Silicon Valley.

== Critical reception ==
The song has received positive reviews from critics. Jon Blistein of Rolling Stone called the song a "chunky, funky soul cut" as well as a "knockout blow". The same magazine ranked "Don't Wanna Fight" at number 20 on its annual year-end list to find the best songs of 2015. Ann Powers of NPR called the song a "deep soul track" and further stated that the song is "just a taste" of what the band has to offer on the new album. In December 2015, the song received two Grammy Awards nominations for Best Rock Song and Best Rock Performance, winning both in February 2016. Stephen Thomas Erlewine on AllMusic described the song as "strong, boundless funk". NME described it as "taut, lascivious funk".

== Charts ==
| Chart (2015) | Peak position |
|---|---|
| Belgium (Ultratip Bubbling Under Flanders) | 32 |
| Belgium (Ultratip Bubbling Under Wallonia) | 31 |
| Canada Rock (Billboard) | 4 |
| France (SNEP) | 112 |
| Japan Hot 100 (Billboard) | 61 |
| US Hot Rock & Alternative Songs (Billboard) | 13 |
| US Rock & Alternative Airplay (Billboard) | 19 |

=== Year-end charts ===
| Chart (2015) | Position |
|---|---|
| US Hot Rock Songs | 50 |

== Certifications ==
| Region | Certification | Certified units/sales |
|---|---|---|
| Canada (Music Canada) | Gold | 40,000^{‡} |
| New Zealand (RMNZ) | Gold | 15,000^{‡} |
| United States (RIAA) | Platinum | 1,000,000^{‡} |
^{‡} Sales+streaming figures based on certification alone.
