= Boys & Girls (album) =

Studio album by Alabama Shakes
- Released: April 9, 2012
- Recorded: 2011
- Studios: The Bomb Shelter (Nashville, Tennessee)
- Genres: Blues rock; rock and roll; Southern soul
- Length: 36:12
- Label: ATO
- Producers: Alabama Shakes; Andrija Tokic

Alabama Shakes chronology
| Alabama Shakes (2011) | Boys & Girls (2012) | Sound & Color (2015) |

Singles from Boys & Girls
- 1. "Hold On" Released: February 6, 2012

Boys & Girls is the debut studio album from American band Alabama Shakes. It was released on April 9, 2012, through ATO Records. The album peaked at number 6 on the US Billboard 200 and number 3 on the UK Albums Chart. A tenth anniversary deluxe edition was released on December 9, 2022, including a bonus disc of the band's live performance at KCRW's Morning Becomes Eclectic.

== Composition ==
With Boys & Girls, Alabama Shakes craft a musical fusion of blues and rock 'n' roll. It also has roots in Southern soul, yielding a "raw, grainy" take on the style. The album also draws from hard rock and punk, working them alongside the band's "rootsy, passionate appeal".

== Critical reception ==
Professional ratings
Aggregate scores
| Source | Rating |
|---|---|
| AnyDecentMusic? | 7.0/10 |
| Metacritic | 76/100 |
Review scores
| Source | Rating |
| AllMusic | 3.5/5 stars |
| The A.V. Club | B− |
| The Daily Telegraph | 4/5 stars |
| The Guardian | 3/5 stars |
| The Independent | 5/5 stars |
| Los Angeles Times | 3.5/4 stars |
| NME | 7/10 |
| Pitchfork | 7.8/10 |
| Rolling Stone | 3.5/5 stars |
| Spin | 7/10 |

The album has been well received by critics. Gavin Haynes of NME gave Boys & Girls a positive review, stating, "In many ways Boys & Girls it is as note-perfect an album as you'll hear all year, yet it's also often perfectly inert. Their new bestie Jack White flagrantly copied vast chunks of the past, but in so doing he also stripped it down and rebuilt it in his own image. Despite their obviously vast talent, still less than a year after they first read about themselves on the internet, the stellar rise and rise of Alabama Shakes possibly hasn't afforded them quite enough time to find out who they really are." Los Angeles Times also gave the album a positive review stating, "The Alabama Shakes’ first album, "Boys & Girls," is an electric jolt that anyone who loves blues-based rock music should track down immediately. Consisting of three men and one young explosion named Brittany Howard on vocals and guitar, the group, which formed in northern Alabama in 2009, offers stripped down truth, minus any affectation, histrionics or irony."

The album was listed at #34 on Rolling Stone's list of the top 50 albums of 2012.

== Commercial performance ==
Boys & Girls debuted at number sixteen on the US Billboard 200. The album reached its peak at number six with 33,000 copies sold that week. As of April 2015, the album has sold 744,000 copies in the US.

On April 12, 2012 the album entered the Irish Albums Chart at number thirteen. The album entered the UK Albums Chart at number three, and also topped the inaugural Official Record Store Chart.

== Track listing ==
All tracks are written by Alabama Shakes.

| No. | Title | Length |
|---|---|---|
| 1. | "Hold On" | 3:46 |
| 2. | "I Found You" | 2:59 |
| 3. | "Hang Loose" | 2:24 |
| 4. | "Rise to the Sun" | 3:08 |
| 5. | "You Ain't Alone" | 4:44 |
| 6. | "Goin' to the Party" | 1:45 |
| 7. | "Heartbreaker" | 3:47 |
| 8. | "Boys & Girls" | 3:25 |
| 9. | "Be Mine" | 4:14 |
| 10. | "I Ain't the Same" | 2:55 |
| 11. | "On Your Way" | 3:05 |
| Total length: | | 36:19 |

Platinum Edition bonus 7-inch vinyl
| No. | Title | Length |
|---|---|---|
| 12. | "Heavy Chevy" | 2:25 |
| 13. | "Pocket Change" | 2:25 |
| 14. | "Mama" | 1:34 |
| Total length: | | 42:43 |

Spotify edition
| No. | Title | Length |
|---|---|---|
| 12. | "Pocket Change" | 2:25 |
| 13. | "Heavy Chevy" | 2:25 |
| Total length: | | 41:09 |

Deluxe edition disc 1 bonus track
| No. | Title | Length |
|---|---|---|
| 12. | "Heavy Chevy" | 2:25 |
| Total length: | | 45:08 |

Deluxe edition disc 2 (live at KCRW)
| No. | Title | Length |
|---|---|---|
| 1. | "Hang Loose" | 2:20 |
| 2. | "I Found You" | 3:22 |
| 3. | "Be Mine" | 4:05 |
| 4. | "I Ain't the Same" | 3:19 |
| 5. | "Mama" | 1:32 |
| 6. | "Goin' to the Party" | 1:50 |
| 7. | "Hold On" | 3:53 |
| 8. | "Boys & Girls" | 3:48 |
| 9. | "Always Alright" | 3:48 |
| 10. | "Rise to the Sun" | 3:07 |
| 11. | "Heavy Chevy" | 2:40 |
| Total length: | | 33:44 |

== Personnel ==
Alabama Shakes:

- Brittany Howard – lead vocals, guitar, piano, percussion
- Heath Fogg – guitar, backing vocals, percussion
- Zac Cockrell – bass, backing vocals, guitar
- Steve Johnson – drums, backing vocals, percussion

Additional musicians:

- Paul Horton – Farfisa organ and Rhodes piano on "Rise to the Sun", piano and organ on "I Ain't the Same"
- Micah Hulscher – piano and organ on "I Found You" and "Hang Loose"
- Mitch Jones – organ on "Heartbreaker"
- Ben Tanner – piano and organ on "Be Mine"

== Charts ==
=== Weekly charts ===
| Chart (2012–13) | Peak position |
|---|---|
| Australian Albums (ARIA) | 36 |
| Austrian Albums (Ö3 Austria) | 63 |
| Belgian Albums (Ultratop Flanders) | 4 |
| Belgian Albums (Ultratop Wallonia) | 66 |
| Canadian Albums (Billboard) | 15 |
| Danish Albums (Hitlisten) | 18 |
| Dutch Albums (Album Top 100) | 7 |
| French Albums (SNEP) | 62 |
| German Albums (Offizielle Top 100) | 59 |
| Irish Albums (IRMA) | 5 |
| Norwegian Albums (VG-lista) | 34 |
| Scottish Albums (Official Charts) | 6 |
| Spanish Albums (Promusicae) | 87 |
| Swedish Albums (Sverigetopplistan) | 34 |
| Swiss Albums (Schweizer Hitparade) | 48 |
| UK Albums (OCC) | 3 |
| UK Official Record Store Chart (OCC) | 1 |
| US Billboard 200 | 6 |
| US Top Alternative Albums (Billboard) | 2 |
| US Top Rock Albums (Billboard) | 3 |

=== Year-end charts ===
| Chart (2012) | Position |
|---|---|
| Belgian Albums (Ultratop Flanders) | 49 |
| Dutch Albums (Album Top 100) | 83 |
| UK Albums (OCC) | 101 |
| US Billboard 200 | 93 |
| US Top Alternative Albums (Billboard) | 18 |
| US Independent Albums (Billboard) | 8 |
| US Top Rock Albums (Billboard) | 26 |

| Chart (2013) | Position |
|---|---|
| US Billboard 200 | 85 |
| US Top Alternative Albums (Billboard) | 13 |
| US Independent Albums (Billboard) | 7 |
| US Top Rock Albums (Billboard) | 19 |

== Certifications ==
| Region | Certification | Certified units/sales |
|---|---|---|
| Canada (Music Canada) | Platinum | 80,000^{‡} |
| United Kingdom (BPI) | Gold | 128,266 |
| United States (RIAA) | Platinum | 1,000,000^{‡} |
^{‡} Sales+streaming figures based on certification alone.

== Release history ==
| Country | Release date | Format | Label |
|---|---|---|---|
| United States | April 3, 2012 | Download | ATO Records |
| United Kingdom | April 6, 2012 | Download | Rough Trade Records |
| United Kingdom | April 9, 2012 | CD | Rough Trade Records |
| United States | April 10, 2012 | CD | ATO Records |
