= I Must Be Dreaming =

Studio album by Alabama Shakes
- Released: August 28, 2026
- Studios: Sound Emporium; Blackbird (Nashville, Tennessee)
- Length: 48:05
- Label: Island
- Producers: Alabama Shakes; Shawn Everett

Alabama Shakes chronology
Sound & Color (2015)	I Must Be Dreaming (2026)

Singles from I Must Be Dreaming
- 1. "Another Life" Released: August 29, 2025; 2. "American Dream" Released: April 10, 2026; 3. "I Feel Hope Coming" Released: July 10, 2026

I Must Be Dreaming is the third studio album by the American band Alabama Shakes, released on August 28, 2026, through Island Records. It is the band's first studio album in more than eleven years, following Sound & Color (2015), and their first as a trio consisting of Brittany Howard, Heath Fogg, and Zac Cockrell.

The album was produced by Shawn Everett and Alabama Shakes and recorded at Sound Emporium and Blackbird Studio in Nashville. It was preceded by the singles "Another Life", "American Dream", and "I Feel Hope Coming". It received a nomination for Best Alternative Music Album at the 69th Annual Grammy Awards.

== Background ==
Alabama Shakes released their second studio album, Sound & Color, in 2015 and entered a hiatus three years later. In 2021, drummer Steve Johnson was arrested on charges of child abuse and was subsequently dismissed from the band. Though the charges were later dropped, the group has since continued as a trio. Following nearly a decade of inactivity, Alabama Shakes reunited for a surprise performance in Tuscaloosa, Alabama, in December 2024. On January 27, 2025, Alabama Shakes confirmed that they had begun working on new music after sharing several photographs from a recording studio. The trio embarked on its first tour in eight years later that year and released its first new original material in more than a decade, the single "Another Life", on August 29, 2025. Another single, "American Dream", was released on April 10, 2026.

I Must Be Dreaming was produced by Alabama Shakes in collaboration with Shawn Everett. Recording sessions took place at Sound Emporium Studios and Blackbird Studio in Nashville, Tennessee. The album was announced on July 7, 2026. In a statement accompanying the announcement, singer Brittany Howard described the title as having a "double meaning", explaining that it reflected how the world can seem "fucking crazy" while also being "incredibly beautiful", with both sentiments existing simultaneously. A press release described the album as featuring a "richly textured, psychedelic soul sound" and exploring themes of "love, mortality, human connection, and the increasingly surreal contradictions of modern life".

The announcement coincided with the release of the album's third single, "I Feel Hope Coming", three days later. Howard said the song reflects holding onto hope that younger generations will see through "political lies", while guitarist Heath Fogg said he was "really happy that song exists". To support the album, the band is scheduled to tour North America in the weeks surrounding its release.

== Critical reception ==
Professional ratings
Aggregate scores
Source	Rating
Any Decent Music	7.6/10
Metacritic	82/100
Review scores
Source	Rating
Exclaim!	8/10
Far Out Magazine	4/5 stars
The Line of Best Fit	8/10
NME	3.5/5 stars

Any Decent Music gave the album a weighted average score of 7.6 out of 10 from fifteen critic scores. According to Metacritic, it received "universal acclaim" based on a weighted average score of 82 out of 100 from fifteen critic scores.

== Track listing ==
All tracks are written by Zac Cockrell, Heath Fogg, and Brittany Howard; "Tea Time" written with Paul Horton.

No.	Title	Length
1.	"Tea Time"	3:46
2.	"Another Life"	4:35
3.	"Garden"	4:59
4.	"I Feel Hope Coming"	5:11
5.	"Time"	4:58
6.	"Friends"	3:07
7.	"Easy"	4:15
8.	"How Love's Supposed to Go"	3:36
9.	"Waist Deep"	4:31
10.	"American Dream"	4:27
11.	"Tied to You"	4:40
Total length:		48:05

== Personnel ==
Credits are adapted from Tidal.

=== Alabama Shakes ===
- Zac Cockrell – bass, production (all tracks); keyboards (tracks 2, 10), background vocals (3–5, 8, 9, 11), drums (3)
- Heath Fogg – guitar, production (all tracks); background vocals (3–5, 8, 9, 11)
- Brittany Howard – vocals, guitar, production

=== Additional contributors ===
- Shawn Everett – production, mixing (all tracks); engineering (1–8, 10, 11)
- Ethan Shull – engineering assistance
- Skyler Chuckry – engineering assistance
- Steve Cordray – engineering assistance
- Austin Brown – engineering (9), engineering assistance (1, 3–8, 10, 11)
- Austin Motlow – engineering assistance (1, 3–11)
- Patricia Sullivan – mastering
- Lewis Wright – drums (1–3, 10, 11); percussion, shaker (1); celesta (2, 3); congas, glockenspiel, tambourine (2); vibraphone (3)
- Lloyd Buchanan – keyboards (1–3, 10)
- Paul Horton – keyboards (1, 2, 6, 8, 11)
- Noah Bond – drums (4–9), percussion (4)
- Ben Tanner – keyboards (4–9), engineering (9)

== Charts ==
Chart performance for I Must Be Dreaming
Chart (2026)	Peak position
Belgian Albums (Ultratop Flanders)	61
Belgian Albums (Ultratop Wallonia)	122
French Physical Albums (SNEP)	177
French Rock & Metal Albums (SNEP)	45
Japanese Download Albums (Billboard Japan)	78
Scottish Albums (Official Charts)	27
Swiss Albums (Schweizer Hitparade)	96
UK Albums Sales (Official Charts)	27
UK Americana Albums (Official Charts)	5
US Billboard 200	157
US Americana/Folk Albums (Billboard)	12
US Top Rock & Alternative Albums (Billboard)	40
