= Hold On (Alabama Shakes song) =

Single by Alabama Shakes

from the album Boys & Girls
- Released: February 6, 2012
- Recorded: 2011
- Genre: Southern rock; blues rock
- Length: 3:46
- Label: Rough Trade Records
- Songwriter: Brittany Howard

Alabama Shakes singles chronology
| "Hold On" (2012) | "You Ain't Alone" (2012) |

"Hold On" is a song by American rock band Alabama Shakes. The track was first released on February 6, 2012, in the United Kingdom as the lead single from the studio album Boys & Girls (2012).

== Music video ==
A music video to accompany the release of "Hold On" was first released on YouTube on March 30, 2012. In this video, the song was performed live in a studio.

== Reception ==
"Hold On" received critical acclaim from music critics. Rolling Stone named it the best song of 2012. It was also voted the 11th best single of 2012 by The Village Voice's 40th annual Pazz & Jop poll.

NPR named "Hold On" the fifth best song by a woman or non-binary artist in the 21st century, saying of the song:

"Despite her ability to quickly transition from a sultry croon à la Janis Joplin to a bellowing, often disembodied howl, it's the lyrical wisdom that masks Howard's young age and makes this song special. "Hold On" is not just a mantra offering the encouragement needed to get through life's rough patches; it's a timeless song that wouldn't work without Howard's ability to interweave a myriad of emotions with raw honesty."

== Charts ==
=== Weekly charts ===
Weekly chart performance for "Hold On"
| Chart (2012–2013) | Peak position |
|---|---|
| Belgium (Ultratop 50 Flanders) | 34 |
| Belgium (Ultratip Bubbling Under Wallonia) | 23 |
| Canada Hot 100 (Billboard) | 81 |
| Canada Rock (Billboard) | 7 |
| Japan Hot 100 (Billboard) | 69 |
| Netherlands (Single Top 100) | 49 |
| US Billboard Hot 100 | 93 |
| US Adult Pop Airplay (Billboard) | 33 |
| US Hot Rock & Alternative Songs (Billboard) | 15 |

=== Year-end charts ===
Year-end chart performance for "Hold On"
| Chart (2012) | Position |
|---|---|
| US Hot Rock Songs (Billboard) | 80 |

== Certifications ==
Certifications and sales for "Hold On"
| Region | Certification | Certified units/sales |
|---|---|---|
| Canada (Music Canada) | Gold | 40,000^{*} |
| New Zealand (RMNZ) | Gold | 15,000^{‡} |
| United Kingdom (BPI) | Silver | 200,000^{‡} |
| United States (RIAA) | Gold | 500,000^{‡} |
^{*} Sales figures based on certification alone.^{‡} Sales+streaming figures based on certification alone.

== Release history ==
Release dates and formats for "Hold On"
| Region | Date | Format | Label |
|---|---|---|---|
| United Kingdom | February 6, 2012 | Download | Rough Trade Records |
