= Alabama Shakes =

American rock band

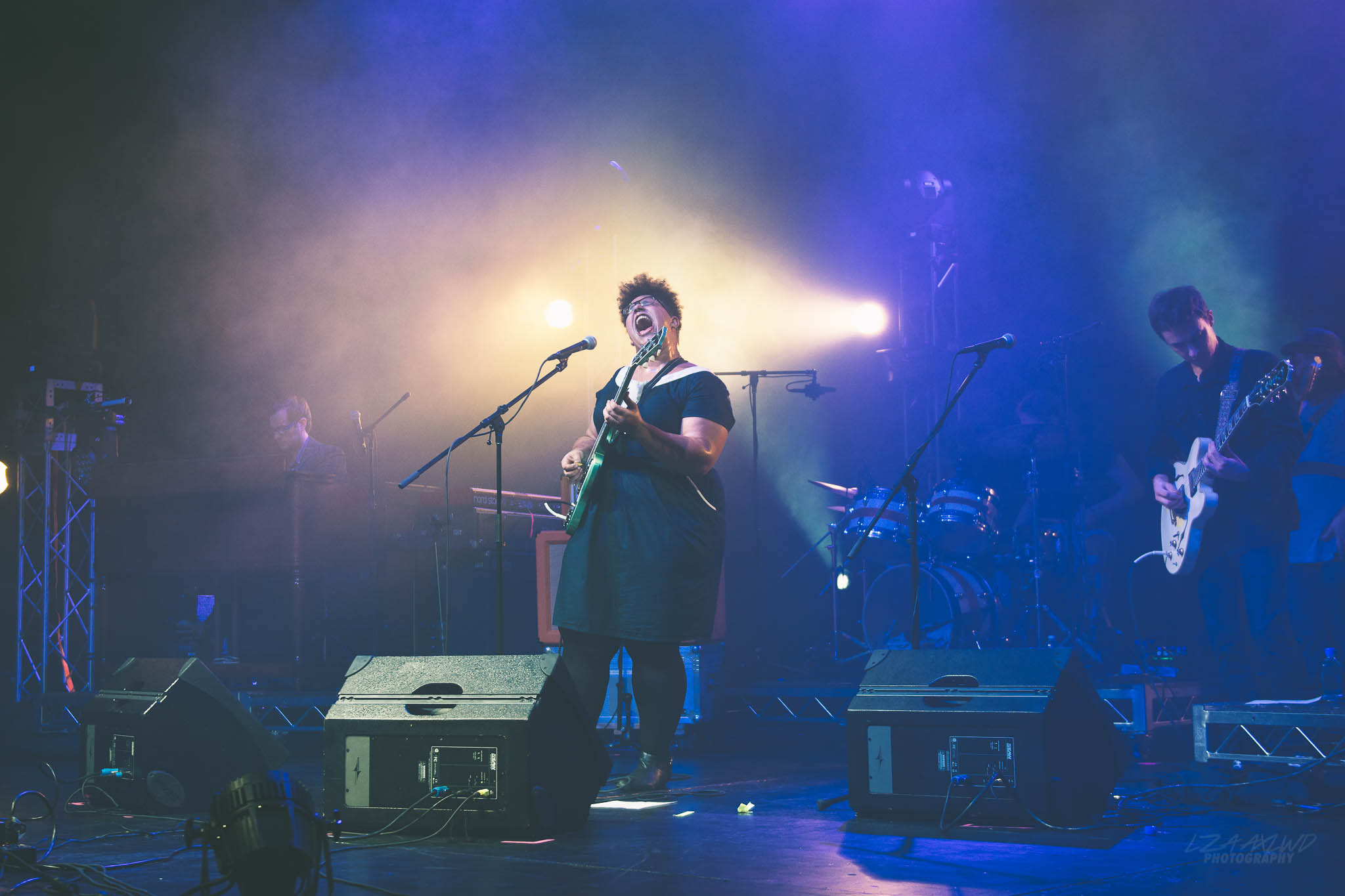
- Alabama Shakes performing in Santa Monica in 2014

Background information
- Origin: Athens, Alabama, U.S.
- Genres: Blues rock; Southern rock; soul; roots rock; garage rock
- Years active: 2009–2018; 2024–present
- Labels: ATO; Island
- Members: Brittany Howard; Zac Cockrell; Heath Fogg
- Past members: Steve Johnson
- Website: alabamashakes.com

Alabama Shakes is an American rock band formed in Athens, Alabama, in 2009. The band consists of lead singer and guitarist Brittany Howard, guitarist Heath Fogg, and bassist Zac Cockrell.

The band began its career touring and performing at bars and clubs around the Southeastern United States for two years while honing its sound and writing music. They recorded their debut album, Boys & Girls, with producer Andrija Tokic in Nashville while still unsigned. Online acclaim led ATO Records to sign the band, which released Boys & Girls in 2012 to critical success. The album's hit single, "Hold On", was nominated for three Grammy Awards. After a long touring cycle, the band recorded its second record, Sound & Color, which was released in 2015, debuted at number one on the Billboard 200, and won them three Grammy Awards, including Best Rock Song for "Don't Wanna Fight". In 2018, the band won the Grammy Award for Best American Roots Performance for their rendition of "Killer Diller Blues" in the film The American Epic Sessions, bringing their Grammy total to four.

The group went on hiatus in 2018, and Howard embarked on a solo career. On December 18, 2024, the band reunited for a surprise performance at the Bama Theatre in Tuscaloosa. On January 27, 2025, the band posted on Instagram that they were working on new music, and in February, they announced a reunion tour scheduled from July to September 2025. The band's third album I Must Be Dreaming, their first album in eleven years, was released on August 28, 2026.

== History ==
=== 2004–2009: Early years ===
Brittany Howard grew up interested in music, filling notebooks with lyrics and teaching herself to play drums, bass, and guitar. Howard played in multiple bands at East Limestone High School that helped to formulate and craft her taste in music. Her most serious band in her early years was Kerosene Swim Team, a rock band that consisted of Owen Whitehurst and Jonathan Passero. They went on to have a single titled "Coffins and Cadillacs" featured on a compilation track from now defunct indie label Volital Records. They would practice daily after school in Passero's garage, Whitehurst's garage, and Howard's house. They mainly played house parties, and their songs consisted of a mix of covers and originals penned by Howard. Both Whitehurst and Passero continued playing backup for Howard, with Whitehurst playing with Howard and bassist Zac Cockrell in what would eventually become The Shakes. Whitehurst played drums and piano, with Howard and Cockrell playing their current respective instruments.

=== 2009–2011: Formation ===
Howard met Heath Fogg in junior high when he played guitar at house parties. She met classmate and bassist Cockrell in a psychology class some time later, and they soon began to spend time listening to their favorite music together and writing their own. After graduation, Howard hosted twice-weekly jam sessions at her great-grandparents' former home. Drummer Steve Johnson, who had heard Howard singing at a party years prior, began attending the jam sessions at the suggestion of Cockrell. They began making music together and recording homemade demos having little else to do in the small town.

The group made its live debut in May 2009 under the name "The Shakes." Fogg, at this point a guitarist in the Athens-based Tuco's Pistol, invited the group to open for his band at Brick Deli & Tavern in Decatur. The band was nervous to perform for an audience, as they felt "vulnerable." Their set included covers of Led Zeppelin, James Brown, Otis Redding, and AC/DC. The show went over well, and Fogg soon joined the group. During this time, the band members held other day jobs: Howard as a fry cook and then a postal worker, Johnson at the Browns Ferry Nuclear Power Plant, Cockrell at an animal clinic, and Fogg painting houses. For much of their early years, the Shakes performed shows on weekends at "sports bars and country dives." They also began recording their debut album at Tokic's Bomb Shelter—the home of producer Andrija Tokic—in Nashville, funding the recordings themselves. The band chose Tokic's over other studios because they recorded mostly live to tape, and they believed it would spur a livelier performance. The band would complete arrangements in their hometown and drive an hour and a half north to Nashville to record in intervals over the course of 2011.

Their breakthrough came when Justin Gage, a Los Angeles music blogger and SiriusXM host, found a photo of Howard performing online. After contacting the band in July 2011, he posted an MP3 of their song "You Ain't Alone" on his music blog, Aquarium Drunkard. By the next morning, the group was awash in offers from record labels and management companies. Gage also contacted Patterson Hood, vocalist of the band Drive-By Truckers, who attended a show not long after. He arranged to set the band up with his managers, Christine Stauder and Kevin Morris. Alabama Shakes released a four-song EP, Alabama Shakes, in September 2011, which gained media attention (including NPR) and earned an invitation to play at the CMJ Music Marathon industry showcase in New York. The band began negotiating a record deal with ATO Records and added "Alabama" to their name after Joseph Hicks, of Halo Stereo, noticed how many groups shared the name "The Shakes". They began to open for the Drive-By Truckers.

=== 2012–2014: Boys & Girls and mainstream success ===
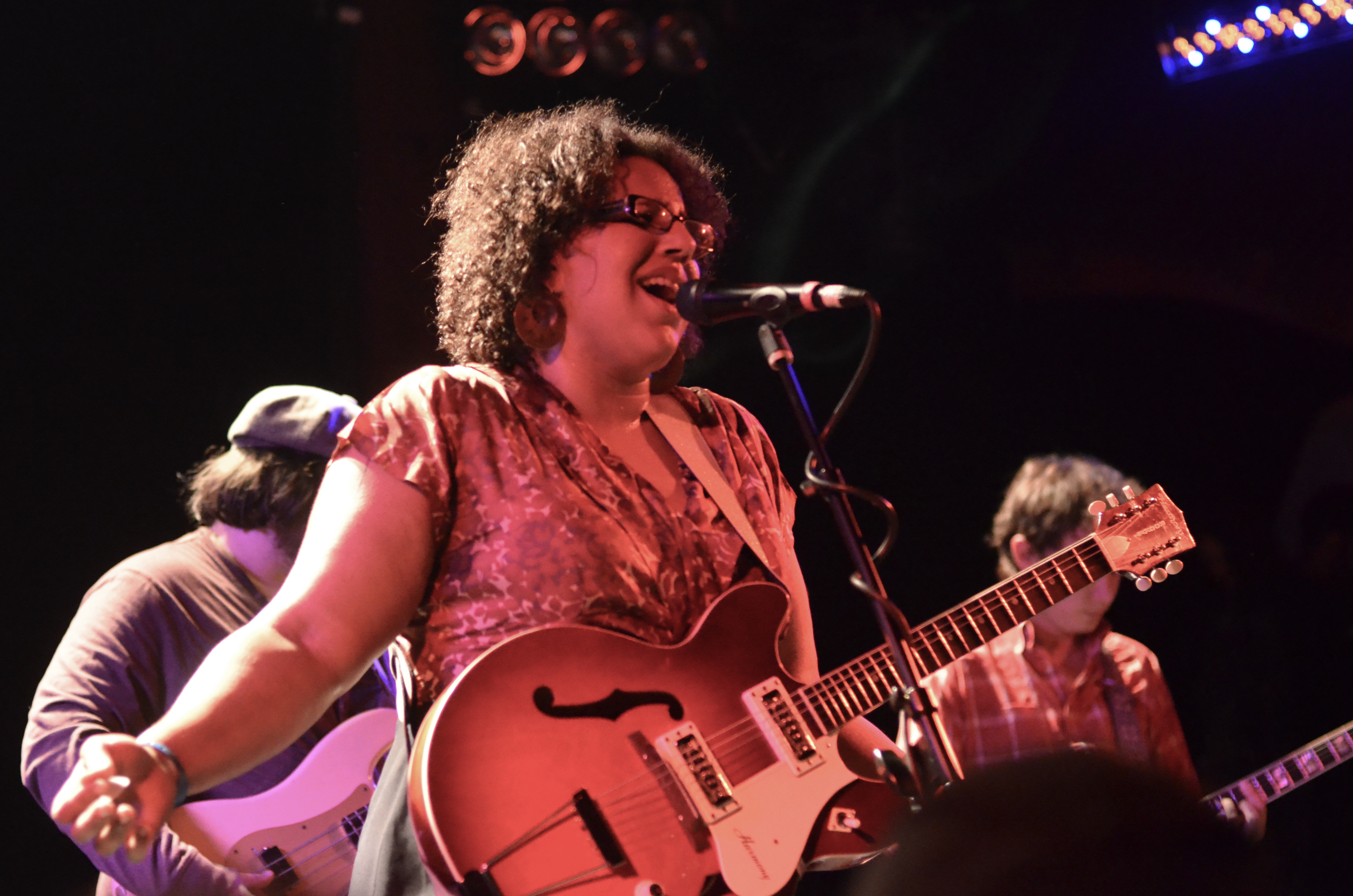
The band performing three months prior to the release of Boys & Girls (2012).

The band's first full-length album, Boys & Girls, was released in April 2012. It debuted at number 16 on the national charts as a digital-only release, but climbed to number eight as physical releases were distributed. The album received near-universal acclaim. After a European tour, they opened for Jack White over a summer tour and performed at several major music festivals, including Sasquatch, Bonnaroo and Lollapalooza. The album's lead single, "Hold On" was a radio hit (peaking at number one on Billboard's Adult Alternative Songs chart) and was dubbed the best song of the year by Rolling Stone.

The New York Times credited their "rapid ascent" to "Howard's singular stage presence." The group received three nominations for the 2013 Grammy Awards: Best New Artist, Best Rock Performance for "Hold On," and Best Recording Package for their debut album, Boys & Girls. After the Grammy's performance, Boys & Girls returned to the top 10, peaking at number six a year after its release. Boys & Girls was certified Gold by the RIAA for sales of over 500,000 in the United States on March 13, 2013. It has since sold over 744,000 copies in the US.

=== 2015–2018: Sound & Color ===
The band began recording their second album in late 2013. They spent over a year in the studio, with no clear end-goal, as they had not written any new songs due to their exhaustive touring schedule.

The group's second studio album, Sound & Color, was released on April 21, 2015. It debuted at number one on the Billboard 200 in the US, making it the band's first number one album. The record's lead single, "Don't Wanna Fight", was a number two hit on the Adult Alternative Songs chart. The album eventually earned three Grammy Awards, including Best Alternative Music Album.

The band played for the VMworld 2015 Party at AT&T Park in San Francisco on September 2, 2015, and British Summer Time in Hyde Park, London on July 8, 2016.

In 2018, the band won the Grammy Award for Best American Roots Performance for their rendition of "Killer Diller Blues" in the film The American Epic Sessions, which was directed by Bernard MacMahon. They recorded the song live on the restored first electrical sound recording system from the 1920s.

=== 2018–2024: Hiatus, solo careers and Steve Johnson's arrest ===
In 2018, the band went on hiatus to allow Howard to focus on her debut solo album, Jaime, which was released to critical acclaim in 2019. The following year, in June 2020, guitarist Fogg released his debut solo project under the name Sun on Shade.

While the band was on hiatus, in March 2020, drummer Steve Johnson pleaded guilty to domestic violence, harassment and stalking in relation to his ex-wife, following their divorce after three and a half years of marriage. He received a one-year suspended prison sentence and 24 months' probation. On March 24, 2021, Johnson was arrested on suspicion of child abuse and was subsequently indicted by a grand jury on charges of "wilful torture, wilful abuse, and cruelly beating or otherwise wilfully maltreating a child under the age of 18." He was released on bail. The charge was later dismissed in December 2021. Johnson did not rejoin the band following these incidents.

In February 2024, Howard released her second solo album, What Now, to widespread critical acclaim. The album placed highly on several end-of-year critics lists and was supported by extensive touring, including performances at Coachella, Glastonbury Festival and Bonnaroo Festival.

=== 2024–present: Reunion and I Must Be Dreaming ===
On December 18, 2024, Howard, Cockrell and Fogg reunited for a surprise performance at the Bama Theatre in Tuscaloosa. On January 27, 2025, the band posted on Instagram that they are working on new music.

On February 7, 2025, the band announced their first tour in eight years, from July to September 2025. The band confirmed that new music will be released as a three-piece, with Johnson no longer a member of the band following his legal troubles. Howard stated: "Last year, Heath, Zac, and I started chatting about how much fun it would be to make music together and tour again as Alabama Shakes. This band and these songs have been such a source of joy for all of us. It is crazy that it has been 10 years since we released Sound & Color and eight years since we played a show. But, we didn’t want this to entirely be a look back. We wanted it to be as much about the future as the past. So we have a bunch of new music that will be released soon. We just can’t wait to experience that ‘feeling’ when we start playing those first few notes of ‘Don’t Wanna Fight’ or ‘Gimme All Your Love.’"

The band signed with Island Records in 2025 and released the single "Another Life" on August 29, their first single in ten years. This was followed by the protest song "American Dream" in April 2026. On July 7, 2026, the band announced their third studio album I Must Be Dreaming, their first album in eleven years, along with its third single "I Feel Hope Coming".

== Musical style ==
Early critical reviews of their debut, Boys & Girls (2012), noted that the band borrowed from mid-20th century rhythm and blues. Alongside Howard's voice, the songs were compared to artists such as Janis Joplin, Otis Redding, and Aretha Franklin. Howard herself took inspiration from Bon Scott of AC/DC in her vocal style, praising his "soulful" way of singing. As the acclaim mounted, "reviewers speculated" that their sound was in homage to the music produced in Muscle Shoals, Alabama nearly five decades prior. Cockrell and Fogg were aware of the Shoals legacy, but Howard was more influenced by bands such as Led Zeppelin and artists like David Bowie. The success of debut single "Hold On" led some to believe the group "[was] trying to pass themselves off as revivalists, something they never aspired to be."

Their second record, Sound & Color (2015), is steeped in several different genres, and touches on everything from shoegaze to bands such as MC5.

=== Influence ===
Alabama Shakes has been cited as an influence for artists such as Drake, Childish Gambino, and Beyoncé.

== Band members ==
=== Current ===
- Brittany Howard – lead vocals, rhythm guitar (2009–2018; 2024–present)
- Zac Cockrell – bass guitar (2009–2018; 2024–present)
- Heath Fogg – lead guitar, backing vocals (2009–2018; 2024–present)

=== Former ===
- Steve Johnson – drums, backing vocals (2009–2018)

=== Touring ===
- Ben Tanner – keyboards
- Paul Horton – keyboards
- Noah Bond – drums
- Shanay Johnson – backing vocals
- Karita Law – backing vocals
- Lloyd Buchanan – backing vocals

== Discography ==
Studio albums

- Boys & Girls (2012)
- Sound & Color (2015)
- I Must Be Dreaming (2026)

== Awards and nominations ==
=== Grammy Awards ===
Year	Nominee / work	Award	Result
2013	Alabama Shakes	Best New Artist	Nominated
2013	"Hold On"	Best Rock Performance	Nominated
2014	"Always Alright"	Best Rock Performance	Nominated
2016	"Don't Wanna Fight"	Best Rock Performance	Won
2016	"Don't Wanna Fight"	Best Rock Song	Won
2016	Sound & Color	Album of the Year	Nominated
2016	Sound & Color	Best Alternative Music Album	Won
2017	"Joe" (Live from Austin City Limits)	Best Rock Performance	Nominated
2018	"Killer Diller Blues" (The American Epic Sessions)	Best American Roots Performance	Won
2027	"Waist Deep"	Best American Roots Song	Pending
2027	I Must Be Dreaming	Best Alternative Music Album	Pending

=== Other awards ===
Year	Nominee / work	Award	Result
2012	Boys & Girls	AIM Independent Music Awards for Independent Album of the Year	Nominated
2012	Alabama Shakes	AIM Independent Music Awards for Independent Breakthrough Act	Nominated
2012	Alabama Shakes	Q Award for Best New Act	Nominated
2012	Alabama Shakes	Americana Music Honors & Award for Emerging Artist of the Year	Won
2012	Alabama Shakes	Rober Awards Music Poll for Best Songwriter	Nominated
2013	Alabama Shakes	BRIT Award for International Group	Nominated
2013	Alabama Shakes	NME Awards for Best New Band	Nominated
2013	Alabama Shakes	AIM Independent Music Award for Most Played New Independent Act	Nominated
2013	Alabama Shakes	Libera Award for Best Live Act	Won
2013	Boys & Girls	Libera Award for Album of the Year	Won
2014	"You Ain't Alone" in Dallas Buyers Club	Libera Award for Best Sync Usage	Nominated
2015	Alabama Shakes	NME Awards for Best International Band	Nominated
2015	Alabama Shakes	Rober Awards Music Poll for Best Group or Duo	Nominated
2015	Alabama Shakes	Rober Awards Music Poll for Best Rock Artist	Nominated
2016	Alabama Shakes	BRIT Award for International Group	Nominated
2016	Sound & Color	Billboard Music Awards for Top Rock Album	Nominated
2016	Sound & Color	AIM Independent Music Award for Best Second Album	Nominated
2016	Sound & Color	Album of the Year	Won
2016	Sound & Color	Libera Award for Groundbreaking Album of the year	Nominated
2016	Sound & Color	Libera Award for Marketing Genius	Won
2016	Alabama Shakes	Libera Award for Best Live Act	Won
2016	iPad Pro Commercial	Libera Award for Best Sync Usage	Nominated
2016	Alabama Shakes	Americana Music Honors & Award for Duo/Group of the Year	Nominated
2017	Transparent Season 3 (Official Trailer)	Libera Award for Best Sync Usage	Nominated

Preceded by Justin Bieber	Saturday Night Live musical guest February 16, 2013	Succeeded by Macklemore & Ryan Lewis
Preceded by D'Angelo	Saturday Night Live musical guest February 28, 2015	Succeeded by Zac Brown Band
