= Metronomy discography =

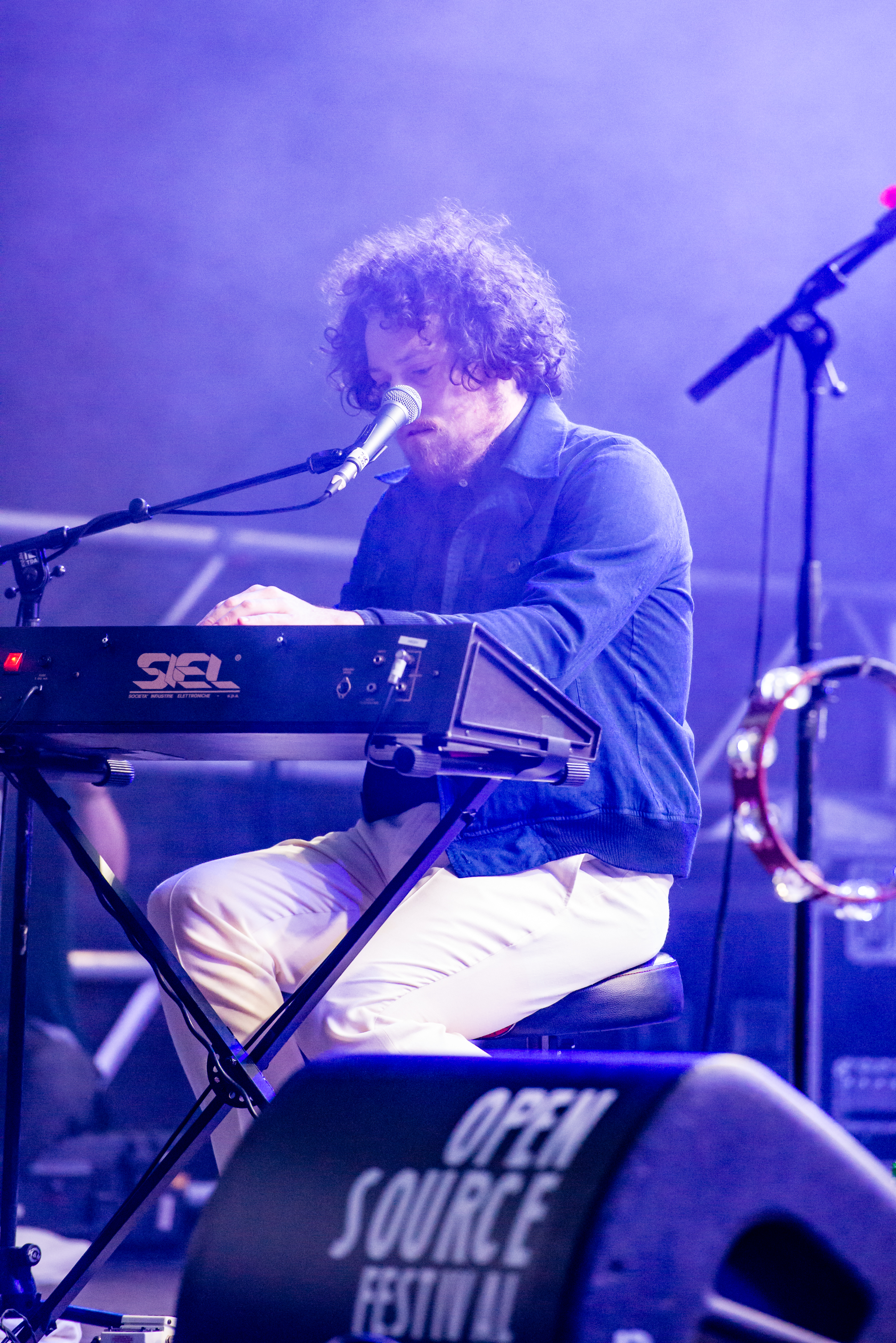
- Joseph Mount performing at Open Source Festival on 27 June 2015
- Studio albums: 7
- EPs: 5
- Singles: 17

The discography of the English electronic group Metronomy consists of seven albums, five EPs and a number of singles. Lead vocalist and main songwriter of the band Joseph Mount also releases remixes under the name.

== Studio albums ==
List of studio albums, with selected chart positions and certifications
Title	Details	Peak chart positions									Certifications
Title	Details	UK	BEL (Fl)	BEL (Wa)	FRA	GER	POR	SPA	SWI	US Heat	Certifications
Pip Paine (Pay the £5000 You Owe)	Released: 14 February 2005; Label: Holiphonic; Formats: CD, digital download	—	—	—	—	—	—	—	—	—	
Nights Out	Released: 2008; Label: Because Music; Formats: CD, digital download, vinyl	106	—	—	129	—	—	—	—	—	
The English Riviera	Released: 2011; Label: Because Music; Formats: CD, digital download, vinyl	28	—	73	22	—	—	—	79	—	BPI: Gold
Love Letters	Released: 10 March 2014; Label: Because Music; Formats: CD, digital download, vinyl	7	65	12	7	55	—	98	21	7	
Summer 08	Released: 1 July 2016; Label: Because Music; Formats: CD, digital download, vinyl	20	109	26	9	56	—	—	22	—	
Metronomy Forever	Released: 13 September 2019; Label: Because Music; Formats: CD, digital download, vinyl	15	78	28	19	68	25	54	32	—	
Small World	Released: 18 February 2022; Label: Because Music; Formats: CD, digital download, vinyl	7	166	22	27	50	—	—	31	—	
"—" denotes a recording that did not chart or was not released in that territory.

== Extended plays ==
- Wonders (2005, Wonders/Holiphonic)
- You Could Easily Have Me (2006, Holiphonic)
- Heartbreaker Vs. Holiday (2008, Because Music)
- Not Made for Love (2009, Because Music)
- Green Room (2012, Because Music)
- Posse, Vol. 1 (2021)
- Posse, Vol. 2 (2024)

== Singles ==
List of singles, with selected chart positions and certifications
Title	Year	Peak chart positions					Certifications	Album
Title	Year	UK	BEL (Fl)	BEL (Wa)	FRA	MEX	Certifications	Album
"Trick or Treatz"	2006	—	—	—	—	—		Pip Paine (Pay the £5000 You Owe)
"Radio Ladio"	2007	—	—	—	—	—		Nights Out (+ Deluxe Edition)
"My Heart Rate Rapid"	2008	—	—	—	—	—		Nights Out (+ Deluxe Edition)
"Holiday"	2008	—	—	—	—	—		Nights Out (+ Deluxe Edition)
"A Thing for Me"	2008	—	—	—	—	—		Nights Out (+ Deluxe Edition)
"Heartbreaker"	2008	—	—	—	—	—		Nights Out (+ Deluxe Edition)
"Radio Ladio" (re-release)	2009	—	—	—	—	—		Nights Out (+ Deluxe Edition)
"She Wants"	2010	—	—	—	—	—		The English Riviera
"The Look"	2011	190	—	84	43	—	BPI: Gold	The English Riviera
"The Bay"	2011	—	—	80	180	—		The English Riviera
"Everything Goes My Way"	2011	—	—	—	—	—		The English Riviera
"I'm Aquarius"	2013	—	—	—	97	—		Love Letters
"Love Letters"	2014	—	97	77	44	46		Love Letters
"Reservoir"	2014	—	—	—	—	39		Love Letters
"Boy Racers"	2015	— (Note: "Meet Me in the City" did not enter the UK Singles Chart, but peaked at number 45 on the UK Physical Singles Chart.)	—	—	—	—		Love Letters
"Old Skool"	2016	—	— (Note: "Old Skool" did not enter the Flanders Ultratop Top 50, but spent 4 weeks as an extra tip on the Flanders Ultratop Bubbling Under chart.)	— (Note: "Old Skool" did not enter the Wallonie Ultratop Top 50, but spent 4 weeks as an extra tip on the Wallonie Ultratop Bubbling Under chart.)	92	—		Summer 08
"Night Owl"	2016	—	—	—	108	—		Summer 08
"Lately"	2019	—	—	—	—	—		Metronomy Forever
"Salted Caramel Ice Cream"	2019	—	—	—	—	—		Metronomy Forever
"Walking in the Dark"	2019	—	—	—	—	—		Metronomy Forever
"Wedding Bells"	2019	—	— (Note: "Wedding Bells" did not enter the Flanders Ultratop Top 50, but spent 4 weeks as an extra tip on the Flanders Ultratop Bubbling Under chart.)	—	—	—		Metronomy Forever
"Mandibules"	2021	— (Note: "Mandibules" did not enter the UK Singles Chart, but peaked at number 32 on the UK Physical Singles Chart.)	—	—	—	—		Non-album single
"It's Good to Be Back"	2021	—	—	—	—	—		Small World
"—" denotes a recording that did not chart or was not released in that territory.

== Remixes ==
- Air - "So Light Is Her Footfall"
- Architecture in Helsinki – "Do the Whirlwind"
- Box Codax – "Naked Smile"
- Cassius featuring Ryan Tedder & Jaw - "The Missing" (Metronomy's EDM Mix)
- Charlie Alex March – "Piano Song"
- Charlotte Gainsbourg – "5:55"
- CSS – "Move"
- Dead Disco – "The Treatment"
- Diplo - "Newsflash"
- DNTEL – "The Distance"
- Franz Ferdinand – "Do You Want To"
- Get Cape. Wear Cape. Fly – "I-Spy"
- Goldfrapp - "Happiness"
- Good Shoes – "Morden"
- Gorillaz – "El Mañana"
- Hot Club de Paris – "Clockwork Toy"
- Infadels – "Love Like Semtex"
- Joakim - "Spiders"
- k.d. lang - "Coming Home"
- Kate Nash – "Foundations"
- Klaxons – "Atlantis to Interzone"
- Lady Gaga - "You and I"
- Ladytron – "Sugar"
- Late of the Pier - "The Bears Are Coming"
- Love Is All - "Spinning and Scratching"
- Lykke Li - "I'm Good, I'm Gone"
- Magnet – "Hold On"
- Max Sedgley – "Slowly"
- Midnight Juggernauts - "Into the Galaxy"
- Myd featuring Mac DeMarco - "Moving Men"
- Roots Manuva – "Awfully Deep (Lambeth Blues)"
- Sébastien Tellier – "La Ritournelle"
- Temposhark – "Not That Big"
- The Very Best - "Warm Heart Of Africa"
- Ximena Sariñana - "La tina"
- The Young Knives – "Weekends and Bleak Days (Hot Summer)"
- Zero 7 – "Futures"

Like many contemporary artists Metronomy have utilized MySpace to promote and release music. Joseph has in the past uploaded unreleased remixes and covers from the likes of 100 Bullets Back, Britney Spears, Bright Eyes and U2 as well as his own original material.

== Production ==
- Charlie Alex March - "In The End"
- Nicola Roberts - "I" and "Fish Out Of Water" - Cinderella's Eyes
- Roots Manuva – "Let The Spirit" and "C.R.U.F.F."- Slime & Reason
- CocknBullKid - "Dumb" - Adulthood
- Sophie Ellis-Bextor - "Make A Scene" - Make a Scene
- Night Works - "Boys Born In Confident Times", "The Eveningtime" and "Long Forgotten Boy" - Urban Heat Island

== Unreleased remixes and cover versions ==
- Bright Eyes - "Gold Mine Gutted"
- Britney Spears - "Toxic"
- The Cure - "Fascination Street"
- The Customers - "Morning Sickness"
- Empire of the Sun - "We Are the People"
- Scissor Sisters - "Other Side"
- U2 - "City of Blinding Lights"
