= Rarities (Selah Sue album) =

Compilation album by Selah Sue
- Released: 2 November 2012
- Genres: Pop; soul; R&B; trip hop
- Label: Because

Selah Sue chronology
Selah Sue (2011)	Rarities (2012)	Reason (2015)

Singles from Reason
- 1. "Fade Away" Released: 21 September 2012

Rarities is a compilation album by Belgian musician Selah Sue.

== Track listing ==
Rarities
No.	Title	Length
1.	"Fade Away"	3:27
2.	"Raggamuffin" (featuring J. Cole)	3:29
3.	"Famous"	3:42
4.	"On the Run"	3:22
5.	"The More That I"	7:13
6.	"Break"	4:14
7.	"All I Need from You"	3:59
8.	"Zanna (Music for Life)" (with Tom Barman vs. The Subs)	3:38
9.	"Crazy Vibes" (AKS Midnight Edit)	4:03
10.	"Raggamuffin" (Bodyspasm Remix)	4:08
11.	"Crazy Sufferin Style" (Blackjoy Remix)	2:59

== Charts ==
Chart (2012)	Peak position
French Albums (SNEP)	57
