= Emmanuel de Buretel =

French businessman

- Born: Emmanuel de Buretel de Chassey; 22 December 1958 (age 67); Algiers, French Algeria
- Occupation: Music executive
- Years active: 1986–present
- Organisation: Because Group
- Label: Because Music
- Spouse: Jenna de Rosnay
- Children: 3

Emmanuel de Buretel (born Emmanuel de Buretel de Chassey; 22 December 1958) is a French music executive best known as the founder of Because Music, and for his work with Virgin Records.

== Early life and education ==
Emmanuel de Buretel de Chassey was born on 22 December 1958 in Algiers, French Algeria. He is the son of Marc Marie René de Buretel de Chassey and Christine Marie Élisabeth Audéoud, and the grandson of Air Force General Xavier Marie Roger de Buretel de Chassey and Yolande Marie Thérèse Rolland de Chambaudouin d'Erceville. He is also the cousin of art historian Éric de Chassey.

He graduated as an engineer from the École nationale des travaux publics de l'État (ENTPE) in 1982 and holds a Master's degree in Civil Engineering from the Massachusetts Institute of Technology (MIT).

During his studies at ENTPE, as a member of the association responsible for organizing events at the school, he regularly organized concerts, even managing to bring rock bands such as U2 and The Cure to Vaulx-en-Velin.

== Career ==
=== Virgin ===
A graduate of the Massachusetts Institute of Technology, de Buretel was appointed in 1986 CEO of Virgin Publishing France by Richard Branson and went on to sign artists such as Youssou Ndour, Cheb Khaled, Mano Negra, Les Négresses Vertes.

He was instrumental in the emergence of the hip hop genre in France with successes of IAM, Tonton David and many more.

In 1991, he created Delabel Records (a division of Virgin) and signed artists such as Keziah Jones, IAM, Tonton David, les Rita Mitsouko, Rhoff, -M- and many others.

From 1992, de Buretel was at the head of Virgin Records France where he created Delabel, Source, Labels, a collection of creative independent cells under the “labels” banner which was considered to be one of the most credible independent platforms in Europe and an alternative to major companies. He brought artists like Manu Chao, Air, and Daft Punk to international attention when he took over at the head of Virgin Continental Europe back in 1998.

During the same period, Ken Berry, former CEO of EMI Music Worldwide, let him set up his publishing company Delabel Editions.

Emmanuel de Buretel signed writers and composers including Louise Attaque, Daft Punk, Air, Doc Gyneco, Cheb Mami, Madredeus.

He also acquired the catalogs Sidonie Crescelles (Serge Gainsbourg, Julien Clerc, Jacques Brel...) and Vanessa Paradis (first two albums).

=== EMI Europe ===
He became President of EMI Continental Europe in London in 2001, at the head of a group of 21 subsidiaries within which he developed a catalogue of European artists such as M83, Daft Punk, Tiziano Ferro, Lene Marlin and Röyksopp, and signed David Guetta under Virgin France. He was instrumental in the acquisition of the independent label Mute by EMI.

In 2002, taking inspiration from the Mercury Prize, he created the Prix Constantin which rewards young artists for having imprinted their talent on the world every year.

=== Because ===
In disagreement with the vision of EMI, he left the company in March 2004 in order to create Because Group, a new independent London and Paris based structure, involved in all aspects of the music industry.:

• Because Music : musical and audiovisual production (Christine and The Queens, Major Lazer, Camille, Selah Sue, Metronomy, Charlotte Gainsbourg, Justice, Amadou & Mariam, Manu Chao, Prince, Moby...)

• Because Editions : publishing (Daft Punk, Foals, Stromae, Christine and The Queens, Danza Kuduro, Thomas Dutronc, NTM, Sebastian, Justice, Cassius) sub-publishing (Bob Marley, Concord Music, Notting Hill...). Along with Xavier Niel, he bought out Jeune Musique, Claude François' catalog including the song « My Way ».

• Corida : live production (Manu Chao, Radiohead, Daft Punk, Eric Clapton, Christine and The Queens, Selah Sue, Catherine Ringer, Rammstein, Justice...) and management (Manu Chao, Catherine Ringer)

• La Cigale / La Boule Noire : concert halls (Paris).

== Personal life ==
He is married to American windsurfer Jenna de Rosnay (née Severson), sharing three children.

== Awards and achievements ==
He was knighted as a member of the French Ordre des Arts et des Lettres.

2015 sees the launch of Because Publishing in the U.S., the nomination of Emmanuel de Buretel at the Board of Merlin, his appointment as President of SPPF (neighboring societies for independent labels in France), his appointment as Knight of Legion d'Honneur. After Because acquired the London Records back catalogue in summer 2017, de Buretel expected to use the label's British operations for signing urban and dance artists.
