= Reason (Selah Sue album) =

Studio album by Selah Sue
- Released: 26 March 2015
- Recorded: 2014
- Genres: Pop; soul; R&B; trip hop
- Length: 49:04
- Label: Because
- Producers: Dan Dare; Ludwig Göransson; Robin Hannibal; Hudson Mohawke; Pomrad; Jan De Ryck; Salva; Matt Schwartz; Itai Shapira; Jerren Spruill; Troy Taylor; Wim Thijs; Utters; Werther

Selah Sue chronology
Rarities (2012)	Reason (2015)	Persona (2022)

Singles from Reason
- 1. "Alone" Released: 27 October 2014; 2. "Reason" Released: 16 February 2015; 3. "I Won't Go for More" Released: 15 June 2015; 4. "Fear Nothing" Released: 10 December 2015; 5. "Together" Released: 22 February 2016

Reason is the second studio album by the Belgian musician Selah Sue. Distributed by Warner Music Group, it was released by Because Music on March 26, 2015.

== Track listing ==
Standard edition
No.	Title	Writer(s)	Producer(s)	Length
1.	"Alone"	Sanne Putseys; Sean Fenton; Robin Hannibal	Hannibal; Itai Shapira^{[A]}; Salva^{[A]}	3:28
2.	"I Won't Go for More"	Putseys; Birsen Uçar	Hannibal; Shapira^{[A]}; Salva^{[A]}	4:20
3.	"Reason"	Putseys; Clément Dumoulin; Uçar; Hannibal	Hannibal	3:20
4.	"Together" (featuring Childish Gambino)	Putseys; Evan Kidd Bogart; Donald Glover; Göransson	Göransson	3:21
5.	"Alive"	Putseys; Uçar; Hannibal; Michael Asante	Göransson; Hannibal	3:41
6.	"The Light"	Putseys; Ross Birchard; Uçar	Hudson Mohawke; Hannibal	3:46
7.	"Fear Nothing"	Putseys; Matt Schwartz	Schwartz	3:25
8.	"Daddy"	Putseys; Joachim Saerens; Yannick Werther; Uçar; Hannibal; Jordi Geuens; Erik Rademakers	Göransson	4:26
9.	"Sadness"	Putseys; Troy Taylor; Jerren Spruill; Raja Kumari	Taylor; Spruill	4:01
10.	"Feel"	Putseys; Dan Radclyffe; Uçar	Utters	3:39
11.	"Right Where I Want You"	Putseys; Pieterjan Seaux; Uçar	Göransson; Hannibal	3:32
12.	"Always Home"	Putseys; Mocky; Werther; Uçar; Rademakers	Göransson; Hannibal	4:18
13.	"Falling Out"	Putseys; Joachim Saerens; Uçar	Göransson	3:49

Limited edition
No.	Title	Writer(s)	Producer(s)	Length
14.	"Gotta Make It Last"	Putseys; Saerens; Werther; Uçar; Hannibal; Jordi Geuens; Rademakers	Göransson	3:12
15.	"Stand Back"	Putseys; Mocky; Werther; Uçar; Hannibal; Geuens; Rademakers	Göransson	4:11
16.	"Direction"	Putseys; Louis Favre; Pieterjan Seaux; Uçar		4:00
17.	"Alone" (Acoustic Version)	Putseys; Fenton; Hannibal	Göransson; Hannibal; Itai Shapira^{[A]}; Salva^{[A]}	3:40

Deluxe edition
No.	Title	Writer(s)	Producer(s)	Length
14.	"Alive (Felix Joseph Remix)" (featuring Kwabs)	Putseys; Uçar; Hannibal; Asante; Kwabena Sardokee Adjepong	Felix Joseph; Göransson; Hannibal	3:16
15.	"Together (Marlin Remix)" (featuring Childish Gambino)	Putseys; Bogart; Glover; Göransson	Marlin; Göransson	3:29
16.	"Holdin' On"	Putseys; Werther; Uçar; Dan Dare; Rademakers	Werther; Dare	4:46
17.	"Falling Out (Pomrad Remix)"	Putseys; Joachim Saerens; Uçar	Pomrad; Göransson	4:16
18.	"High Low" (with Maverick)	Putseys; Wim Thijs; Uçar	Thijs	4:11
19.	"Always Home (Sorry Remix)"	Putseys; Mocky; Werther; Uçar; Rademakers	Göransson; Hannibal	3:48
20.	"Blame" (Live@Giel)	Calvin Harris; James Newman		4:03
21.	"Speaking Silence"	Putseys; Uçar	Jan De Ryck	3:56
22.	"Reason" (Live Acoustic Version)	Putseys; Fenton; Hannibal		3:55
23.	"Fear Nothing" (Live Acoustic Version)	Putseys; Schwartz		3:44
24.	"Falling Out" (Live Acoustic Version)	Putseys; Saerens; Uçar		3:52
25.	"Time"	Putseys; Werther; Uçar	Hannibal	4:15

Notes and sample credits

^{^[A]} denotes co-producer

== Charts ==
=== Weekly charts ===
Chart (2015)	Peak position
Belgian Albums (Ultratop Flanders)	1
Belgian Albums (Ultratop Wallonia)	1
Dutch Albums (Album Top 100)	1
French Albums (SNEP)	3
German Albums (Offizielle Top 100)	82
Hungarian Albums (MAHASZ)	36
Polish Albums (ZPAV)	23
Swiss Albums (Schweizer Hitparade)	9

=== Year-end charts ===
Chart (2015)	Position
Belgian Albums (Ultratop Flanders)	6
Belgian Albums (Ultratop Wallonia)	7
Dutch Albums (Album Top 100)	44
French Albums (SNEP)	31
Chart (2016)	Position
Belgian Albums (Ultratop Flanders)	72
Belgian Albums (Ultratop Wallonia)	77
French Albums (SNEP)	198

== Certifications ==
Region	Certification	Certified units/sales
Belgium (BRMA)	Gold	15,000^{*}
^{*} Sales figures based on certification alone.

In 2016, it was awarded a gold certification from the Independent Music Companies Association, indicating sales of at least 75,000 copies throughout Europe.
