= Alone (Selah Sue song) =

Single by Selah Sue

from the album Reason
- Released: 27 October 2014
- Genre: Pop; soul pop; R&B
- Length: 3:28
- Label: Because Music
- Songwriters: Sanne Putseys; Sean Fenton; Robin Hannibal
- Producers: Hannibal; Itai Shapira; Salva

Selah Sue singles chronology
"Zanna" (2011)	"Alone" (2014)	"Reason" (2015)

Alone is a song by Belgian recording artist Selah Sue. It was written by Sue along with Sean Fenton and Robin Hannibal, and produced by the latter for her second studio album Reason (2015), featuring co-production from Itai Shapira and Salva. Distributed by Warner Music Group, it was released by Because Music on 27 October 2014 as the album's lead single.

== Formats and track listings ==
EP
No.	Title	Writer(s)	Length
1.	"Alone" (Album Version)	Sanne Putseys; Sean Fenton; Robin Hannibal	3:28
2.	"Together" (featuring Childish Gambino)	Putseys; Evan Kidd Bogart; Donald Glover; Göransson	3:21
3.	"Time"	Putseys; Yannick Werther; Birsen Uçar	4:16
4.	"Won't Go for More" (Acoustic Version)	Putseys; Uçar	3:13

Remix single
No.	Title	Writer(s)	Length
1.	"Alone" (featuring Guizmo)	Sanne Putseys; Sean Fenton; Robin Hannibal	3:08

== Charts ==
=== Weekly charts ===
Chart (2014)	Peak position
Belgium (Ultratop 50 Flanders)	5
Belgium (Ultratop 50 Wallonia)	1
France (SNEP)	9
Netherlands (Single Top 100)	53

=== Year-end charts ===
Chart (2015)	Position
Belgium (Ultratop Flanders)	70
Belgium (Ultratop Wallonia)	31
France (SNEP)	66
