= I Won't Go for More =

Single by Selah Sue

from the album Reason
- Released: June 15, 2015
- Genre: Pop; soul pop
- Length: 4:20
- Label: Because
- Songwriter(s): Sanne Putseys; Birsen Uçar
- Producer(s): Robin Hannibal; Itai Shapira; Salva

Selah Sue singles chronology
"Reason" (2015)	"I Won't Go for More" (2015)	"Fear Nothing" (2015)

I Won't Go for More is a song by Belgian recording artist Selah Sue. It was written by Sue and Birsen Uçar and produced by Robin Hannibal for her second studio album Reason (2015), featuring co-production from Itai Shapira and Salva. Distributed by Warner Music Group, it was released as the album's third single by Because Music on June 15, 2015.

== Credits and personnel ==
Credits adapted from the Reason liner notes.

- Andrew Dawson – mixing
- Robin Hannibal – producer, instruments
- Mike Malchicoff – mixing assistance
- Jake Najor – drums
- Sam Robles – baritone saxophone
- Paul Salva – drums, percussion, co-production
- Itai Shapira – bass, guitar, co-production
- Todd Simon – flugelhorn, trumpet
- Sanne Putseys – composer
- Birsen Uçar – lyrics
- Tracy Wannomae – alto saxophone, bass clarinet, flute, tenor saxophone

== Charts ==
Chart (2015)	Peak position
Belgium (Ultratop 50 Flanders)	4
Belgium (Ultratop 50 Wallonia)	16
