= Jenna de Rosnay =

American windsurfer, fashion designer, and model

Jenna de Rosnay (born Jenna Severson, 7 March 1963) is an American windsurfer, fashion designer, and model.

== Career ==
From 1982 Rosnay broke the World Speedsailing Record (500-metre, women's windsurfing) seven times, first at the Speed Trials in Weymouth off the Isle of Portland in the United Kingdom. In 2010 she was inducted into the Speedsailing Hall of Fame.

In 1988 she began designing swimwear for Huit and, later, wetsuits for Neil Pryde.

== Personal life ==
Born in California and raised in Hawaii and Tahiti, de Rosnay is the daughter of John Severson, photographer, film director, and founder of Surfer magazine, and his wife, the former Louise Stier. She has a younger sister, Anna Severson (born 1965).

Jenna de Rosnay has been married twice:

- Arnaud Louis Fromet de Rosnay (1946–1984), a French playboy, photographer, and long-distance windsurfer who was the youngest son of French-Mauritian painter Gaëtan de Rosnay and his wife, the former Natacha Koltchine. Arnaud de Rosnay had previously been married to Isabel Goldsmith, daughter of Sir James Goldsmith and granddaughter of the Bolivian tin tycoon Antenor Patiño and his wife Doña Maria Cristina de Borbon y Bosch Labrus, Duchess of Durcal. Jenna Severson and Arnaud de Rosnay married in 1981, and in 1984, he disappeared at sea while attempting to windsurf from China to Taiwan. The couple had one daughter, Alizé de Rosnay (born 1984), an artist and designer who helps run a family-owned art gallery Puka Puka in Paia, Maui, Hawaii.
- Emmanuel de Buretel, a recording executive who is the founder of Because Music and the former chairman and CEO of EMI Recorded Music Continental Europe. They have three daughters.
