= Zanna =

Single by Selah Sue & Tom Barman vs. The Subs
- Released: 25 November 2011
- Recorded: 2011
- Genre: Pop music
- Length: 3:38
- Label: Because Music
- Songwriters: Anna Domino; Luc Van Acker
- Producer: Jeroen De Pessemier

Selah Sue singles chronology
"Summertime" (2011)	"Zanna" (2011)	"Alone" (2014)

Tom Barman singles chronology
"Zanna" (2011)	"Night of the Hunter" (2016)

"Zanna" is a song originally written and performed by Belgian musician Luc van Acker and American singer Anna Domino in 1984. It was released as single by Wax Trax! Records, with two songs on the B-side, Fear In My Heart and Traveling. It was also included on Van Acker's album The Ship (1985).

Van Acker originally wanted more collaborations with Domino, but she preferred a solo career.

== Cover versions ==
A successful 2011 cover of Zanna was performed by Belgian musician and songwriter Selah Sue, Tom Barman and The Subs. This version was released on 25 November 2011 as a digital download in Belgium. It is the theme song for the charity event "Music for Life 2011". In 2012 the song made a comeback due to the success it had with "Music for Life". Van Acker performed at the Suikerrock festival with a 14-year-old girl who was named after the song "Zanna". Van Acker has previously met the family in 1998 after having made a remix using the sound of her heartbeat in vitro. However, in 2012, music brought the two back together after having found Zanna Ramaekers's a cappella cover of "Zanna" on YouTube. They performed on the stage at Suikerrock and on the Belgian national TV show "Villa Vanthilt".

== Music video ==
A music video to accompany the 2011 re-release of "Zanna" was first released onto YouTube on 28 November 2011 at a total length of three minutes and fifty-seven seconds.

== Track listing ==
Digital download
No.	Title	Length
1.	"Zanna (Music for Life)"	3:38

== Credits and personnel ==
- Lead vocals – Selah Sue
- Producers – Jeroen De Pessemier
- Lyrics – Anna Domino, Luc Van Acker
- Label: Because Music

== Chart performance ==
Chart (2011)	Peak position
Belgium (Ultratop 50 Flanders)	1
Belgium (Ultratop 50 Wallonia)	29
Netherlands (Single Top 100)	72

== Release history ==
Region	Date	Format	Label
Belgium	November 25, 2011	Digital download	Because Music
