= This World (Selah Sue song) =

Single by Selah Sue

from the album Selah Sue
- Released: 9 May 2011
- Recorded: 2010
- Genre: R&B / Soul
- Length: 4:45
- Label: Because Music
- Songwriters: Sanne Putseys; Pieter Jan Seaux; Louis Favre; Joachim Saerens
- Producer: Patrice

Selah Sue singles chronology
"Crazy Vibes" (2011)	"This World" (2011)	"Summertime" (2011)

"This World" is a song performed by Belgian musician and songwriter Selah Sue from her self-titled debut album Selah Sue. It was released on 9 May 2011 in Belgium. The song was nominated for Song of the Year at the Music Industry Awards 2011.

== Track listing ==
Promo CD single
No.	Title	Length
1.	"This World"	4:45

== Credits and personnel ==
- Lead vocals – Selah Sue
- Producers – Patrice
- Lyrics – Sanne Putseys, Pieter Jan Seaux, Louis Favre, Joachim Saerens
- Label: Because Music
- Bass - Pieter Jan Seaux

== Chart performance ==
=== Weekly charts ===
Chart (2011–2013)	Peak position
Belgium (Ultratop 50 Flanders)	2
Belgium (Ultratop 50 Wallonia)	15
Czech Republic (Rádio – Top 100)	72
France (SNEP)	33
Switzerland (Schweizer Hitparade)	42

=== Year-end charts ===
Chart (2011)	Position
Belgium (Ultratop Flanders)	16
Belgium (Ultratop Wallonia)	69

Chart (2012)	Position
France (SNEP)	182

=== Certifications ===
Region	Certification	Certified units/sales
Belgium (BRMA)	Platinum	20,000^{*}
^{*} Sales figures based on certification alone.

== Release history ==
Region	Date	Format	Label
Belgium	9 May 2011	Digital download	Because Music
