= Fear Nothing (song) =

Single by Selah Sue

from the album Reason
- Released: December 10, 2015
- Genre: Pop; trip hop
- Length: 3:25
- Label: Because Music
- Songwriter(s): Sanne Putseys; Matt Schwartz
- Producer(s): Matt Schwartz

Selah Sue singles chronology
"I Won't Go for More" (2015)	"Fear Nothing" (2015)	"Together" (2016)

Fear Nothing is a song by Belgian recording artist Selah Sue. It was written by Sue and Matt Schwartz for her second studio album Reason (2015), while production was helmed by the latter. Distributed by Warner Music Group, it was released as the album's fourth single by Because Music on December 10, 2015.

== Weekly charts ==
Chart (2015)	Peak position
Belgium (Ultratop 50 Flanders)	2
