= The English Riviera (album) =

Studio album by Metronomy
- Released: 8 April 2011
- Studios: Smokehouse (London); Motorbass (Paris)
- Genres: Indietronica; new wave; electronic rock
- Length: 45:04
- Label: Because
- Producer: Joseph Mount

Metronomy chronology
Nights Out (2008)	The English Riviera (2011)	Love Letters (2014)

The English Riviera is the third studio album by English electronic music band Metronomy, released on 8 April 2011 by Because Music. Following the release of their second studio album, Nights Out (2008), founding member Gabriel Stebbing left the band (on this album, Olugbenga Adelekan had joined on bass and Anna Prior had joined on drums). However, Stebbing recorded the bass parts on the album prior to his departure.

The album was nominated for the 2011 Mercury Prize.

== Singles ==
"She Wants" was released as the lead single from the album on 26 January 2011. The music video shows a house party with the action being played out in reverse in one continuous take. The bandmembers are absent although pictures of the group's faces can be seen throughout the video. At one point a QR code is mounted on a wall, providing an interactive feature that allows fans to access the Metronomy website after being scanned.

"The Look" was released as the second single on 11 March 2011. The video, directed by Lorenzo Fonda, depicts the band performing the song in a white room alongside stop motion animated sequences featuring seagulls. The band scenes were filmed in London while the animation was produced in Los Angeles. Frontman Joseph Mount is seen playing a Yamaha Electone EX-2 organ. The song is played over the end titles of the 2013 Pedro Almodóvar film I'm So Excited!

The third single, "The Bay", was released on 10 June 2011. The video, directed by David Wilson, intersperses bird's-eye views of Torbay (known as the English Riviera) and the band performing the song at various places in Torquay where the video was shot.

"Everything Goes My Way" was released on 17 October 2011 as the album's fourth and final single. The video features the band along with guest vocalist Roxanne Clifford having a stroll in a nature reserve surrounded by deer.

== Critical reception ==
Professional ratings
Aggregate scores
Source	Rating
AnyDecentMusic?	7.6/10
Metacritic	78/100
Review scores
Source	Rating
AllMusic	4/5 stars
The Daily Telegraph	4/5 stars
The Guardian	4/5 stars
The Irish Times	4/5 stars
Mojo	4/5 stars
NME	9/10
The Observer	3/5 stars
Pitchfork	6.4/10
Q	4/5 stars
Uncut	4/5 stars

NME placed the album at number two on its list of the "Top 50 Albums of 2011", while Uncut and Q listed the album at numbers three and seventeen, respectively. Mike Williams of NME wrote, "With this, his third full-length album, Joe Mount has transformed his Metronomy project from a jaunty, brilliant, yet ultimately niche electro outfit into one of the most expansive and visionary pop bands in the country".

== Track listing ==
All tracks are written by Joseph Mount.

No.	Title	Length
1.	"The English Riviera"	0:37
2.	"We Broke Free"	4:05
3.	"Everything Goes My Way"	3:30
4.	"The Look"	4:37
5.	"She Wants"	3:51
6.	"Trouble"	4:46
7.	"The Bay"	4:50
8.	"Loving Arm"	3:31
9.	"Corinne"	3:16
10.	"Some Written"	6:03
11.	"Love Underlined"	5:58

iTunes Store bonus tracks
No.	Title	Length
12.	"Tens and Tens"	4:39
13.	"She Wants" (music video)	5:07
14.	"The English Riviera Track by Track" (music video)	10:23

== Personnel ==
Credits adapted from the liner notes of The English Riviera.

=== Metronomy ===
- Joseph Mount – vocals (tracks 2–11); drums (tracks 2–7, 10); guitar (tracks 2, 4–7, 9); Juno-60 (tracks 2, 4); percussion (tracks 3–11); handclaps (track 3); Minimoog (tracks 4, 7); Moog Source (tracks 4, 8, 10); Solina String Ensemble (track 5); bass guitar (tracks 6, 7); talk box, Yamaha CS-80 (track 6); Wurlitzer 200A (tracks 6, 10); congas, EDP Wasp (track 7); Moog modular (track 8); Yamaha CS-50 (track 10); clavinet, Yamaha CS2x (track 11); arrangement (all tracks)
- Oscar Cash – guitar (track 3); saxophone (tracks 3, 7); handclaps (tracks 3, 4, 9); Siel Orchestra (track 4); Juno-60 (tracks 5, 9)
- Anna Prior – backing vocals (track 5); drums (tracks 9, 11); vocals, handclaps (track 9)
- Olugbenga Adelekan – bass guitar, handclaps (track 9)

=== Additional musicians ===
- Harriet Wheeler – violin (track 1)
- Gabriel Stebbing – bass guitar (tracks 2–5, 10); handclaps (track 3); guitar solo (track 9)
- Roxanne Clifford – vocals (track 3)
- Ash Workman – handclaps (track 4)
- Marion Cassan – vocals (track 6)
- Nicole Elizabeth – backing vocals (track 11)

=== Technical ===
- Ash Workman – engineering, mixing
- Jedidiah Allcock – engineering assistance
- Jamie Bell – engineering assistance
- Julien Noudin – engineering assistance
- Nilesh – mastering
- Joseph Mount – production

=== Artwork ===
- John Gorham – cover image
- Grégoire Alexandre – photography
- Joseph Mount – art direction
- Aaron Larney – design layout

== Charts ==
=== Weekly charts ===
Weekly chart performance for The English Riviera
Chart (2011)	Peak position
Australian Digital Albums (ARIA)	49
Belgian Albums (Ultratop Wallonia)	73
French Albums (SNEP)	22
Scottish Albums (Official Charts)	63
Swiss Albums (Schweizer Hitparade)	79
UK Albums (Official Charts)	28
UK Independent Albums (Official Charts)	5

=== Year-end charts ===
Year-end chart performance for The English Riviera
Chart (2011)	Position
French Albums (SNEP)	88

== Certifications ==
Certifications for The English Riviera
Region	Certification	Certified units/sales
United Kingdom (BPI)	Gold	100,000^{‡}
^{‡} Sales+streaming figures based on certification alone.

In 2012, the album was certified 2× Gold by the Independent Music Companies Association (IMPALA), denoting sales in excess of 150,000 copies across Europe.

== Release history ==
Release history for The English Riviera
Region	Date	Label	Ref.
Ireland	8 April 2011	Because	
United Kingdom	11 April 2011	Because	
France	11 April 2011	Warner	
Germany	15 April 2011	Warner	
Australia	6 May 2011	Because	
Canada	31 May 2011	Warner	
United States	26 July 2011	Because; Big Beat; Atlantic	
