= Together (Selah Sue song) =

Single by Selah Sue featuring Childish Gambino

from the album Reason
- Released: February 22, 2016
- Genre: Pop; electropop; trap
- Length: 3:21
- Label: Because Music
- Songwriters: Evan Kidd Bogart; Donald Glover; Ludwig Goransson; Sanne Putseys
- Producer: Ludwig Goransson

Selah Sue singles chronology
"Fear Nothing" (2015)	"Together" (2016)	"Bang Bang" (2016)

Childish Gambino single singles chronology
"Sober" (2014)	"Together" (2016)	"Me and Your Mama" (2016)

"Together" is a song by Belgian recording artist Selah Sue. It was written by Sue, Evan Kidd Bogart, Ludwig Goransson, and Childish Gambino for her second studio album, Reason (2015), the latter of which also appears a guest vocalist on the song. Distributed by Warner Music Group, it was released as the album's second single by Because Music on February 22, 2016.

== Charts ==
=== Weekly charts ===
Chart (2016)	Peak position
Belgium (Ultratop 50 Flanders)	46
