= Summertime (Selah Sue song) =

Single by Selah Sue

from the album Selah Sue
- Released: 4 November 2011
- Recorded: 2011
- Genre: R&B / Soul
- Length: 2:33
- Label: Because Music
- Songwriter(s): Sanne Putseys
- Producer(s): Patrice

Selah Sue singles chronology
"This World" (2011)	"Summertime" (2011)	"Zanna" (2011)

"Summertime" is a song performed by Belgian musician and songwriter Selah Sue from her self-titled debut album Selah Sue. It was released on the 4 November 2011 as a Digital download in Belgium. The song was written by Sanne Putseys and produced by Patrice.

== Track listing ==
Digital download
No.	Title	Length
1.	"Summertime" (Radio Edit)	2:33

== Credits and personnel ==
- Lead vocals – Selah Sue
- Producers – Patrice
- Lyrics – Sanne Putseys
- Label: Because Music

== Chart performance ==
Chart (2011)	Peak position
Belgium (Ultratip Bubbling Under Flanders)	9
Belgium (Ultratip Bubbling Under Wallonia)	17

== Release history ==
Region	Date	Format	Label
Belgium	November 4, 2011	Digital download	Because Music
