= Selah Sue (album) =

Studio album by Selah Sue
- Released: 4 March 2011
- Recorded: 2010
- Genre: R&B; neo-soul
- Label: Because
- Producer: Jerry Duplessis; Farhot; Matt Karmil; Meshell Ndegeocello; Patrice; Salaam Remi; Raphael Schillebeeckx; Pieter Steeno

Selah Sue chronology
Selah Sue (2011)	Rarities (2012)

Singles from Selah Sue
- 1. "Raggamuffin" Released: 7 June 2010; 2. "Crazy Vibes" Released: 10 February 2011; 3. "This World" Released: 9 May 2011; 4. "Summertime" Released: 4 November 2011

Selah Sue is the debut album by Belgian musician and songwriter Selah Sue, released on 4 March 2011 in Belgium. It peaked at number one on the Belgium Albums Chart, and also charted in the Netherlands, France, Poland and Switzerland. The album has sold more than 720,000 copies to date, and has been certified double platinum by the UPFI in France.

== Track listing ==
Selah Sue – Standard edition
No.	Title	Writer(s)	Producer(s)	Length
1.	"This World"	Sanne Putseys; Louis Favre; Joachim Saerens; Pieter Jan Seaux	Patrice	4:45
2.	"Peace of Mind"	Putseys; Farhad Samadzada	Farhot	4:03
3.	"Raggamuffin"	Putseys	Patrice	2:40
4.	"Crazy Vibes"	Putseys; Samadzada; Torsten Haas; Fetsum Sebhat	Farhot	3:48
5.	"Black Part Love"	Putseys	Farhot	4:03
6.	"Mommy"	Putseys	Meshell Ndegeocello	3:37
7.	"Explanations"	Putseys	Sirius	2:47
8.	"Please" (featuring Cee Lo Green)	Thomas DeCarlo Callaway	Matt Karmil; Patrice; Salaam Remi^{[A]}	5:05
9.	"Summertime"	Putseys	Patrice	4:41
10.	"Crazy Sufferin Style"	Putseys; Samadzada; Patrice Bart-Williams	Patrice	4:08
11.	"Fyah Fyah"	Putseys	Patrice	4:02
12.	"Just Because I Do"	Putseys; Pieter Steeno	Steeno	2:53

iTunes bonus track
No.	Title	Writer(s)	Producer(s)	Length
13.	"I Truly Loved Ya"	Putseys	Patrice	2:59

Selah Sue – US edition
No.	Title	Writer(s)	Producer(s)	Length
1.	"This World"	PutseyS; Favre; Saerens; Seaux	Patrice	4:45
2.	"Raggamuffin"	Putseys	Patrice	2:40
3.	"On the Run"	Putseys; Samadzada	Farhot	3:23
4.	"Crazy Sufferin Style"	Putseys; Samadzada; Bart-Williams	Patrice	4:08
5.	"Mommy"	Putseys	Ndegeocello	3:37
6.	"Fade Away"	Putseys; Jerry Duplessis; Ronnie Jackson	Duplessis	3:27
7.	"Please" (featuring Cee Lo Green)	Callaway	Karmil; Patrice; Remi^{[A]}	5:05
8.	"Peace of Mind"	Putseys; Samadzada	Farhot	4:03
9.	"Crazy Vibes"	Putseys; Samadzada; Haas; Sebhat	Farhot	3:48
10.	"Fyah Fyah"	Putseys	Patrice	4:02
11.	"Break"	Putseys	Patrice	4:14
12.	"Just Because I Do"	Putseys; Steeno	Steeno	2:53
13.	"Raggamuffin (Remix)" (featuring J. Cole)	Putseys; Jermaine Lamar Cole	Patrice	3:29

Notes

- ^{^[A]} denotes co-producer

== Charts ==
=== Weekly charts ===
Chart (2011)	Peak position
Belgian Albums (Ultratop Flanders)	1
Belgian Albums (Ultratop Wallonia)	1
Dutch Albums (Album Top 100)	2
French Albums (SNEP)	9
Polish Albums (ZPAV)	31
Swiss Albums (Schweizer Hitparade)	32
US Heatseekers Albums (Billboard)	8

=== Year-end charts ===
Chart (2011)	Position
Belgian Albums (Ultratop Flanders)	2
Belgian Albums (Ultratop Wallonia)	4
Dutch Albums (Album Top 100)	13
French Albums (SNEP)	22
Swiss Albums (Schweizer Hitparade)	100
Chart (2012)	Position
Belgian Albums (Ultratop Flanders)	12
Belgian Albums (Ultratop Wallonia)	10
Dutch Albums (Album Top 100)	60
French Albums (SNEP)	28
Chart (2013)	Position
Belgian Albums (Ultratop Flanders)	148
Belgian Albums (Ultratop Wallonia)	122

== Certifications ==
Region	Certification	Certified units/sales
Belgium (BRMA)	4× Platinum	120,000^{*}
Netherlands (NVPI)	Gold	25,000^{^}
Poland (ZPAV)	Platinum	20,000^{*}
^{*} Sales figures based on certification alone.^{^} Shipments figures based on certification alone.

== Release history ==
List of release dates, showing region, formats, label, and reference
Country	Date	Format	Label	Ref
Belgium	4 March 2011	Digital download	Because Music	
United States	28 August 2012	Digital download	Because Music, Columbia Records	
