= Love Letters (Metronomy album) =

Studio album by Metronomy
- Released: 10 March 2014
- Studio: Toe Rag (London)
- Genre: Indietronica, indie pop, synth-pop, new wave, chillwave
- Length: 41:19
- Label: Because
- Producer: Joseph Mount

Metronomy chronology
The English Riviera (2011)	Love Letters (2014)	Summer 08 (2016)

Singles from Love Letters
- 1. "I'm Aquarius" Released: 11 November 2013; 2. "Love Letters" Released: 23 January 2014; 3. "Reservoir" Released: 2 June 2014

Love Letters is the fourth studio album by English electronic music band Metronomy, released on 10 March 2014 by Because Music. It peaked at number seven on the UK Albums Chart, becoming the band's highest-charting album to date.

== Reception ==
Professional ratings
Aggregate scores
Source	Rating
AnyDecentMusic?	7.0/10
Metacritic	73/100
Review scores
Source	Rating
AllMusic	4/5 stars
The Guardian	3/5 stars
The Independent	4/5 stars
The Irish Times	4/5 stars
Mojo	4/5 stars
NME	8/10
Pitchfork	5.2/10
Q	4/5 stars
Rolling Stone	3/5 stars
Uncut	7/10

Love Letters received mostly positive reviews from music critics. According to critic review aggregator Metacritic, the album has received a score of 73 out of 100, based on 26 reviews, indicating "generally favorable reviews". Heather Phares of AllMusic writes that "Musically and emotionally, Love Letters is rawer than what came before it, trading breezy synth pop for insistent psych-rock and soul influences. Confessional and insular, Love Letters is the work of a band willing to take pop success on their own terms and reveal a different – but just as appealing – side of their artistry in the process".

== Track listing ==
All tracks are written by Joseph Mount, except where noted.

No.	Title	Writer(s)	Length
1.	"The Upsetter"		4:17
2.	"I'm Aquarius"		4:01
3.	"Monstrous"		3:53
4.	"Love Letters"	Mount; Airelle Besson	5:15
5.	"Month of Sundays"	Mount; James Hoare	3:36
6.	"Boy Racers"		4:18
7.	"Call Me"		3:51
8.	"The Most Immaculate Haircut"		4:30
9.	"Reservoir"		3:14
10.	"Never Wanted"		4:36

== Personnel ==
Credits adapted from the liner notes of Love Letters.

=== Metronomy ===
- Joseph Mount – vocals, guitar, drums, bass
- Olugbenga Adelekan – bass
- Anna Prior – drums
- Michael Lovett – keyboards
- Oscar Cash – piano, keyboards

=== Additional musicians ===
- Gabriel Stebbing – acoustic guitar (track 1)
- Luke Oldfield – electric guitar (track 1)
- The Proper Ornaments – guitar (track 5)
- Airelle Besson, Daniel Zimmermann, Thomas Depourquery – horns (arranged by Airelle Besson)
- HowAboutBeth, Jaelee Small, Kenzie May Bryant – backing vocals

=== Technical ===
- Joseph Mount – production
- Ash Workman – co-production, engineering, mixing
- Luke Oldfield – engineering, tape operation

=== Artwork ===
- Leslie David – artwork, art direction

== Charts ==
=== Weekly charts ===
Weekly chart performance for Love Letters
Chart (2014)	Peak position
Australian Albums (ARIA)	71
Belgian Albums (Ultratop Flanders)	65
Belgian Albums (Ultratop Wallonia)	12
French Albums (SNEP)	7
German Albums (Offizielle Top 100)	55
Irish Albums (IRMA)	12
Irish Independent Albums (IRMA)	3
Scottish Albums (OCC)	16
Spanish Albums (PROMUSICAE)	98
Swiss Albums (Schweizer Hitparade)	21
UK Albums (OCC)	7
UK Independent Albums (OCC)	2

=== Year-end charts ===
Year-end chart performance for Love Letters
Chart (2014)	Position
Belgian Albums (Ultratop Wallonia)	180
French Albums (SNEP)	123

In 2014, the album was certified Gold by the Independent Music Companies Association (IMPALA), denoting sales in excess of 75,000 copies across Europe.
