= Persona (Selah Sue album) =

Studio album by Selah Sue
- Released: 25 March 2022
- Length: 42:34
- Label: Because
- Producer: Matt Parad

Selah Sue chronology
Reason (2015)	Persona (2022)

Singles from Persona
- 1. "Free Fall" Released: 24 June 2021; 2. "Hurray" Released: 27 August 2021; 3. "Pills" Released: 28 January 2022

Persona is the third studio album by Belgian singer Selah Sue, released on 25 March 2022 through Because Music. The album includes collaborations with Nigerian-Canadian rapper Tobi, Congolese-Belgian rapper Damso and American rapper Mick Jenkins. It was preceded by the singles "Free Fall", "Hurray" and "Pills".

== Background ==
Sue said that with Persona she did not feel pressure to record as with her second album Reason (2015), and only began working on it when she felt she "could make something that [she] could fully support". The songs were inspired by a form of therapy Sue began before recording, called voice dialogue, which involves naming different aspects of one's own personality and learning to accept them "without judgment". Each song is told from the perspective of a different persona, with "Pills", for example, being sung by Sue's "apathetic self", "Hurray" from the dual personalities of "the critic and the attention seeker", and "All the Way Down" from the "inner reconciler", with Sue apologising to her sister.

== Critical reception ==
Willem Jongeneelen, writing for Oor, felt that "not everything is as it seems" on the album, as Sue "sounds cheerful at times" but acknowledges that in the years between her second and third albums, she had to deal with "a lot" in her personal life. Elsewhere, Jongeneelen observed that Sue "sings and raps freely" and "apparently effortlessly slaloms past funky beats and warm atmospheric passages", ultimately concluding that it is "good to have her back".

== Track listing ==
Persona track listing
No.	Title	Length
1.	"Kingdom"	2:46
2.	"Hurray" (featuring Tobi)	3:48
3.	"Try to Make Friends"	3:58
4.	"Pills"	3:31
5.	"Wanted You to Know" (featuring Damso)	3:26
6.	"There Comes a Day"	3:23
7.	"All the Way Down"	4:01
8.	"Catch My Drift"	3:30
9.	"Twice a Day"	3:41
10.	"Celebrate" (featuring Mick Jenkins)	3:23
11.	"Karma"	3:45
12.	"Full of Life"	3:22
Total length:		42:34

Digital deluxe edition bonus tracks (disc 2)
No.	Title	Length
1.	"Pills" (single version)	2:58
2.	"Hurray" (featuring Benjamin Epps)	2:40
3.	"Free Fall"	3:07
4.	"Hurray" (Black Dive remix)	3:52
5.	"You" (rework)	3:18
Total length:		15:55

Physical deluxe edition bonus tracks (disc 2)
No.	Title	Length
1.	"Free Fall"	3:07
2.	"All Day All Night"
3.	"The Knife"
4.	"Hurray" (featuring Benjamin Epps)	2:40
5.	"Hurray" (Black Dive remix)	3:52
6.	"You" (rework)	3:18
7.	"Lovefool"

== Charts ==
=== Weekly charts ===
Weekly chart performance for Persona
Chart (2022)	Peak position
Belgian Albums (Ultratop Flanders)	5
Belgian Albums (Ultratop Wallonia)	4
French Albums (SNEP)	18
Dutch Albums (Album Top 100)	15
Swiss Albums (Schweizer Hitparade)	34

=== Year-end charts ===
Year-end chart performance for Persona
Chart (2022)	Position
Belgian Albums (Ultratop Flanders)	168
Belgian Albums (Ultratop Wallonia)	140
