= Reason (Selah Sue song) =

Single by Selah Sue

from the album Reason
- Released: February 16, 2015
- Genre: Pop
- Length: 3:20
- Label: Because Music
- Songwriter(s): Sanne Putseys; Clément Dumoulin; Robin Hannibal; Birsen Uçar
- Producer(s): Robin Hannibal

Selah Sue singles chronology
"Alone" (2014)	"Reason" (2015)	"I Won't Go for More" (2015)

Reason is a song by Belgian recording artist Selah Sue. It was written by Sue, Clément Dumoulin, Birsen Uçar, and Robin Hannibal for her same-titled second studio album (2015), while production was helmed by the latter. Distributed by Warner Music Group, it was released as the album's second single by Because Music on February 16, 2015

== Charts ==
=== Weekly charts ===
Chart (2015)	Peak position
Belgium (Ultratop 50 Flanders)	2
Belgium (Ultratop 50 Wallonia)	41
France (SNEP)	115
