= Seye Adelekan =

Nigerian British bassist, musician

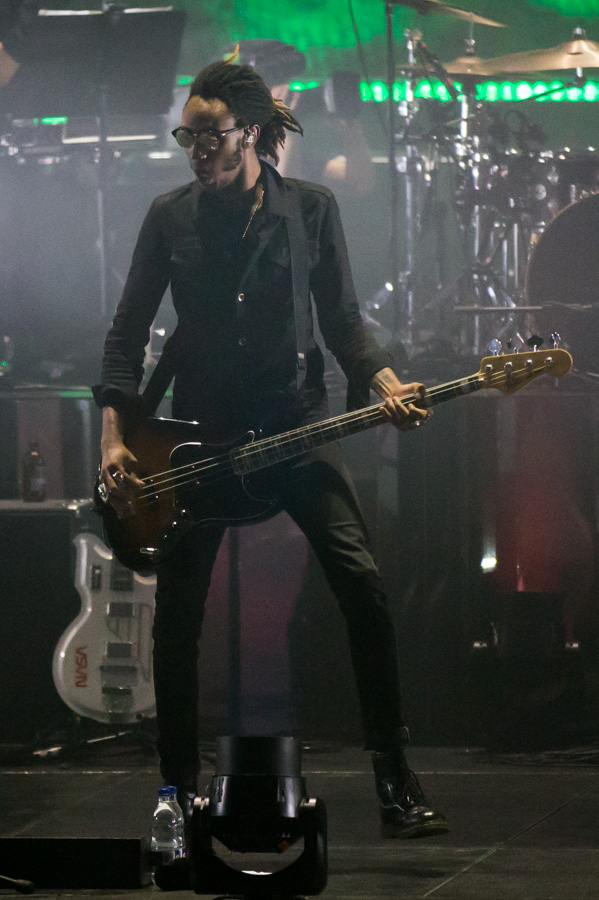
- Seye performing with Gorillaz at the Oslo Spektrum, 2017

Background information
- Birth name: Seye Adelekan
- Also known as: Seye
- Born: 15 May 1988 (age 36); Nigeria
- Origin: Bromley, Greater London, England
- Genres: Alternative rock; electronic; trip hop
- Occupation(s): Bassist, singer-songwriter
- Instruments: Bass; guitar
- Years active: 2007–present
- Labels: Stranger Records
- Member of: Gorillaz

Seye Adelekan (born 15 May 1988), sometimes known mononymously as Seye (/ˈʃeɪə/ SHAY-uh), is a Nigerian British bassist and singer-songwriter, best known as the live bassist for Gorillaz since 2017.

== Early life ==
Seye Adelekan was born in Nigeria to a father who worked in the oil industry. He grew up in Lagos, Netherlands, Ecuador and south-east London.

== Career ==
Seye's music career began in 2007. In 2012 Seye released his debut solo single "White Noise".

Seye toured with Lana Del Rey, Emeli Sandé and worked as session musician for Paloma Faith, before joining Gorillaz in 2017. He has a tattoo of a dove (Spanish paloma) as a tribute to Faith.

== Personal life ==
Seye's brother Olugbenga Adelekan is also a professional musician best known as the bassist for the band Metronomy.
