= Philip Castle =

English painter (1942–2026)

Philip Castle (20 October 1942 – 20 February 2026) was a British airbrush artist.

== Life and career ==
Castle was born in Huddersfield, West Yorkshire, England, on 20 October 1942. He is best known for designing posters for the Stanley Kubrick films A Clockwork Orange and Full Metal Jacket as well for Paul McCartney's Wings tour, among others. He was also responsible for the artwork of the hard rock video magazine, Hard'n'Heavy, the cover art and original Elite logo for the seminal space video game Elite (1984) and its accompanying novella The Wheel, as well as the European poster for the Tim Burton film Mars Attacks! He has also designed record sleeves for albums by David Bowie, Mott the Hoople, The Cars, Elkie Brooks, and Pulp.

He was later commissioned to create the artwork for Metronomy's 2008 album Nights Out as well as their single "Heartbreaker".

Castle also designed the posters for the Royal International Air Tattoo, held at RAF Fairford in Gloucestershire, United Kingdom, for the 2008, 2009 and 2010 events.

He is also known for paintings combining women, often Hollywood idols, into the composition of paintings with classic aircraft, notably Plane Jane, a portrait of Jane Russell with a B-17 bomber.

Castle died of pneumonia on 20 February 2026, at the age of 83.
