= Summer 08 =

Studio album by Metronomy
- Released: 1 July 2016
- Genre: Funk; indietronica
- Length: 39:06
- Label: Because
- Producer: Joseph Mount

Metronomy chronology
Love Letters (2014)	Summer 08 (2016)	Metronomy Forever (2019)

Singles from Summer 08
- 1. "Old Skool" Released: 11 May 2016

Summer 08 is the fifth studio album by English electronic music band Metronomy, released on 1 July 2016 by Because Music.

Professional ratings
Aggregate scores
Source	Rating
Metacritic	74/100
Review scores
Source	Rating
AllMusic	4/5 stars
Clash	7/10
Consequence of Sound	C
DIY	4/5 stars
Exclaim!	8/10
NME	4/5 stars
Pitchfork	7.2/10

== Recording and release ==
Summer 08 is Metronomy's first album recorded solely by member Joseph Mount since their debut effort, Pip Paine (Pay the £5000 You Owe). Its title and release date was announced on BBC Radio 1 in an interview with Annie Mac on 11 May 2016, simultaneously with a release of the album's first single, "Old Skool". Collin Robinson of Stereogum called the song a "disco-leaning, 808-heavy, DJ-scratching throwback of a jam." The track "Mick Slow" samples most of the track "Weather the Windmill" from Mick Karn's first solo album, Titles. Metronomy included Karn's track in their edition of the Late Night Tales series in 2012.

== Critical reception ==
Summer 08 received mostly positive reviews from music critics. According to critic review aggregator Metacritic, the album has received a score of 74/100, based on 23 reviews, indicating "generally favorable". Laura Snapes of Pitchfork writes that "Metronomy's latest record strips away any pretense that they are a band, focusing on its sole creator, Joe Mount. The album solidifies his own idiosyncratic brand of standoffish funk."

== Track listing ==
Summer 08 track listing
No.	Title	Length
1.	"Back Together"	3:40
2.	"Miami Logic"	3:20
3.	"Old Skool"	5:13
4.	"16 Beat"	3:16
5.	"Hang Me Out to Dry" (with Robyn)	3:50
6.	"Mick Slow"	5:02
7.	"My House"	3:19
8.	"Night Owl"	4:28
9.	"Love's Not an Obstacle"	3:15
10.	"Summer Jam"	3:43

== Charts ==
Chart performance for Summer 08
Chart (2016)	Peak position
Belgian Albums (Ultratop Flanders)	109
Belgian Albums (Ultratop Wallonia)	26
French Albums (SNEP)	9
German Albums (Offizielle Top 100)	56
Irish Albums (IRMA)	49
Scottish Albums (OCC)	24
Swiss Albums (Schweizer Hitparade)	22
UK Albums (OCC)	20
UK Independent Albums (OCC)	7
