= Raggamuffin (song) =

Single by Selah Sue

from the album Selah Sue
- Released: 7 June 2010
- Recorded: 2010
- Genre: Neo soul, pop rock
- Length: 2:38
- Label: Because
- Songwriter(s): Sanne Putseys
- Producer(s): Patrice

Selah Sue singles chronology
| "Raggamuffin" (2010) | "Crazy Vibes" (2011) |

"Raggamuffin" is a song performed by Belgian musician and songwriter Selah Sue from her self-titled debut album Selah Sue. It was released on 7 June 2010 as a digital download in Belgium and re-released on 22 October 2010.

== Background ==
The song was originally released on Selah Sue's 2010 EP of the same name. The original version also contained a sample of the Rascalz song "Top of the World".

== Music video ==
A music video to accompany the release of "Raggamuffin" was first released onto YouTube on 27 September 2010, at a total length of two minutes and thirty-seven seconds.

== Track listing ==
Digital download – Single
| No. | Title | Length |
|---|---|---|
| 1. | "Raggamuffin" | 2:38 |

Digital download – EP
| No. | Title | Length |
|---|---|---|
| 1. | "Raggamuffin" | 2:38 |
| 2. | "Crazy Vibes" | 3:49 |
| 3. | "On the Run" | 3:22 |
| 4. | "Break" | 4:14 |
| 5. | "The More That I" | 5:25 |

== Credits and personnel ==
- Lead vocals – Selah Sue
- Producers – Patrice
- Lyrics – Sanne Putseys
- Label: Because Music

== Chart performance ==
| Chart (2010) | Peak position |
|---|---|
| Belgium (Ultratop 50 Flanders) | 29 |
| Belgium (Ultratop 50 Wallonia) | 16 |
| France (SNEP) | 18 |
| Netherlands (Single Top 100) | 81 |

=== Certifications ===
| Region | Certification | Certified units/sales |
|---|---|---|
| Belgium (BRMA) | Gold | 10,000^{*} |
^{*} Sales figures based on certification alone.

== Release history ==
| Region | Date | Format | Label |
|---|---|---|---|
| Belgium | 7 June 2010 | Digital download – Single | Because Music |
| Belgium | 22 October 2010 | Digital download – EP | Because Music |
