= Bang Bang (DJ Fresh and Diplo song) =

Single by DJ Fresh and Diplo featuring R. City, Selah Sue and Craig David
- Released: 9 December 2016
- Recorded: 2016
- Genre: Dance
- Length: 3:20
- Label: Ministry of Sound
- Songwriters: Craig David; Lukasz Gottwald; Theron Thomas; Timothy Thomas; Henry Walter; Thomas Wesley Pentz; Daniel Stein; Charlotte Aitchison
- Producers: Diplo; DJ Fresh; Dr. Luke

DJ Fresh singles chronology
"Say You Do" (2016)	"Bang Bang" (2016)	"Never Wanna Stop / Civilization" (2018)

Diplo singles chronology
"Hey Baby" (2016)	"Bang Bang" (2016)	"Swerve" (2017)

R. City singles chronology
"Don't You Need Somebody" (2016)	"Bang Bang" (2016)	"Under Your Skin" (2017)

Selah Sue singles chronology
"Together" (2016)	"Bang Bang" (2016)	"So This Is Love" (2017)

Craig David singles chronology
"All We Needed" (2016)	"Bang Bang" (2016)	"Heartline" (2017)

Music video
- "Bang Bang" on YouTube

"Bang Bang" is a single by English music producer DJ Fresh and American music producer Diplo featuring vocals from American production duo R. City, Belgian musician Selah Sue, and English singer Craig David. The song was produced by Dr. Luke and released as a digital download on 9 December 2016 through Ministry of Sound as the eighth single from Fresh's forthcoming fourth studio album.

== Track listing ==
Digital download
No.	Title	Length
1.	"Bang Bang" (featuring R. City, Selah Sue and Craig David)	3:20

== Chart performance ==
=== Weekly charts ===
Chart (2016–17)	Peak position
Belgium (Ultratop 50 Flanders)	35

== Certifications ==
Region	Certification	Certified units/sales
Belgium (BRMA)	Gold	10,000^{‡}
^{‡} Sales+streaming figures based on certification alone.

== Release history ==
Region	Date	Format	Label
United Kingdom	9 December 2016	Digital download	Ministry of Sound
