= Crazy Vibes =

Single by Selah Sue

from the album Selah Sue
- Released: 10 February 2011
- Recorded: 2010
- Genre: R&B, soul, electric blues
- Length: 3:48
- Label: Because Music
- Songwriter(s): Fetsum Sebhat; Farhad Samadzada; Sanne Putseys; Torsten Haas
- Producer(s): Farhot

Selah Sue singles chronology
"Raggamuffin" (2010)	"Crazy Vibes" (2011)	"This World" (2011)

"Crazy Vibes" is a song performed by Belgian musician and songwriter Selah Sue from her self-titled debut album Selah Sue. It was released on 10 February 2011, as a digital download in Belgium.

== Track listing ==
Digital download
No.	Title	Length
1.	"Crazy Vibes"	3:48

== Credits and personnel ==
- Lead vocals – Selah Sue
- Producers – Farhot
- Lyrics – Fetsum Sebhat, Farhad Samadzada, Sanne Putseys, Torsten Haas
- Label: Because Music

== Charts ==
=== Weekly charts ===
Chart (2011)	Peak position
Belgium (Ultratop 50 Flanders)	21
Belgium (Ultratop 50 Wallonia)	26
France (SNEP)	74
Netherlands (Single Top 100)	56

=== Year-end charts ===
Chart (2011)	Position
Belgium (Ultratop Flanders)	73
Belgium (Ultratop Wallonia)	98

== Certifications ==
Region	Certification	Certified units/sales
Belgium (BEA)	Gold	10,000^{*}
^{*} Sales figures based on certification alone.

== Release history ==
Region	Date	Format	Label
Belgium	10 February 2011	Digital download	Because Music
