= Nights Out =

Studio album by Metronomy
- Released: 8 September 2008
- Genre: Electronica, synth-pop
- Length: 44:12
- Label: Because
- Producer: Metronomy

Metronomy chronology
Pip Paine (Pay the £5000 You Owe) (2006)	Nights Out (2008)	The English Riviera (2011)

Nights Out is the second studio album by English electronic music band Metronomy, released on 8 September 2008 by Because Music.

== Background ==
The starting point for the album was, according to lead singer Joseph Mount, "a half-arsed concept album about going out and having a crap time."

Mount wrote and recorded most of the album by himself, but instrumentalists Gabriel Stebbing and Oscar Cash "play bits on a couple of tracks on the album and it's kind of become... Metronomy used to be a him and now it's definitely a they – which takes the heat off me a bit as well".

== Artwork ==
The artwork for the album was created by airbrush artist Philip Castle.

== Release ==
The commercial pressing of the album has a printing error on the cover; instead of reading Nights Out, it merely says Nights. The promotional version is unaffected. It is unknown whether this will be rectified in the next pressing of the album.

In 2012, the album was awarded a double silver certification from the Independent Music Companies Association (IMPALA), denoting sales in excess of 40,000 copies across Europe.

== Singles and EPs ==
Four singles/EPs were released from Nights Out: Radio Ladio – EP, My Heart Rate Rapid – EP, Holiday – Single and Heartbreaker.

"Radio Ladio", released on 12 November 2007, the accompanying video by Daniel Brereton features Joseph, Oscar and Gabriel with their skin painted blues and greens, playing kiddie-like pianos that have incorrect keys while they lust after an unobtainable woman, who at the end is revealed to be a cardboard cut-out.

"My Heart Rate Rapid", released on 7 April 2008, featured remixes from Primary 1 and Maton while the video directed by Dandi Wind featured zentai-suited women dancing in front of a backdrop of lava flows, eruptions fire, toy trains and psychedelic animations.

"Holiday" was first released as a single on 7 July 2008, along with a video by Daniel Brereton. It features the band playing in a studio with weird objects such as a warped mirror, a coloured lilo and many men walking through, holding such objects entering and leaving the shot. Most notably the band all wear sunglasses with the word Holiday written on the lens.

"Holiday" was jointly released in France with Heartbreaker on 1 August 2008 with remixes by other artists.

"Heartbreaker" is the fourth song, released on 1 September 2008 and features the Heartbreaker – EP and Heartbreaker (Dark Disco Remixes) – EP. The video was released on an enhanced version of Nights Out and shows Oscar Cash (apparently having been dumped by a girl) with his friends in their car going to an arcade, a fair and the beach, among others.

"A Thing for Me" is the fifth single and the first single released subsequent to the release of Nights Out. The video features the band and several girls with karaoke words on them with the rolling ball hitting them on the head as it is sung. It also features cutaways to a projector slideshow with speech bubbles featuring the lyrics and other words that sound similar to the lyrics. The song was remixed by French artist Breakbot of Ed Banger Records.

== Critical reception ==
Professional ratings
Review scores
Source	Rating
AllMusic	4/5 stars
Artrocker	5/5 stars
ChartAttack	4/5
Drowned in Sound	8/10
Gigwise	4.5/5 stars
The Guardian	3/5 stars
The Independent	5/5 stars
NME	9/10
The Observer	4/5 stars
Pitchfork	6.6/10
This Is Fake DIY	9/10

The album was placed at number five on NME's "Top 50 Albums of 2008" list.

== Track listing ==
All tracks are written by Metronomy.

No.	Title	Length
1.	"Nights Out"	2:39
2.	"The End of You Too"	3:43
3.	"Radio Ladio"	3:33
4.	"My Heart Rate Rapid"	4:09
5.	"Heartbreaker"	4:13
6.	"On the Motorway"	2:35
7.	"Side 2"	3:29
8.	"Holiday"	4:15
9.	"A Thing for Me"	3:28
10.	"Back on the Motorway"	3:54
11.	"On Dancefloors"	4:43
12.	"Nights Outro"	3:13
Total length:		44:12

Enhanced version
No.	Title	Length
13.	"Radio Ladio" (music video)	3:35
14.	"Holiday" (music video)	3:29
15.	"Heartbreaker" (music video)	3:46

US iTunes Store bonus tracks
No.	Title	Length
13.	"Please Me"	2:39
14.	"The Chase"	2:32
15.	"Heartbreaker" (Discodeine Remix)	5:15
16.	"Heartbreaker" (Kris Menace Remix)	5:40

UK iTunes Store bonus tracks
No.	Title	Length
13.	"Need Now Future"	4:02
14.	"Radio Ladio" (music video)	3:35
15.	"Holiday" (music video)	3:29
16.	"Heartbreaker" (music video)	3:46

=== Nights In ===
A six-track bonus CD was released alongside the album and was available if the album was purchased in Rough Trade stores or in the Rough Trade Album Club. The CD contains:

No.	Title	Length
1.	"Our Raid"
2.	"Let's Have a Party"
3.	"The Chase"
4.	"Holiday" (Bedtime Dub)
5.	"Please Me"
6.	"Over"

== Personnel ==
Credits adapted from the liner notes of Nights Out.

- Metronomy – recording, production, mixing
- Nilesh Patel – mastering
- Philip Castle – original artwork
- MD – design

== Charts ==
2008 chart performance for Nights Out
Chart (2008)	Peak position
French Albums (SNEP)	129
UK Albums (OCC)	106

2019 chart performance for Nights Out
Chart (2019)	Peak position
UK Independent Albums (OCC)	27
