= Small World (Metronomy album) =

Studio album by Metronomy
- Released: 18 February 2022
- Recorded: 2020–2022
- Length: 34:57
- Label: Because
- Producer: Joseph Mount; Ash Workman

Metronomy chronology
Metronomy Forever (2019)	Small World (2022)

Singles from Small World
- 1. "It's Good to Be Back" Released: 27 October 2021; 2. "Things Will Be Fine" Released: 12 January 2022

Small World is the seventh studio album by the English electronic band Metronomy. It was released on 18 February 2022 by Because Music.

== Critical reception ==
Professional ratings
Aggregate scores
Source	Rating
Metacritic	72/100
Review scores
Source	Rating
AllMusic	4/5 stars
Beats Per Minute	75%
Clash	8/10
DIY	4/5 stars
The Independent	3/5 stars
The Line of Best Fit	7/10
Mojo	3/5 stars
NME	4/5 stars
Uncut	3/5 stars
Under the Radar	4/10

Small World received generally favourable reviews from music critics. At Metacritic, which assigns a normalised rating out of 100 to reviews from mainstream publications, the album received an average score of 72, based on 11 reviews. Commenting on the album's sound difference from previous Metronomy albums, NME wrote that the album "might be the biggest diversion of their main stage sound to date, but it's one of the most heartfelt and rewarding".

== Track listing ==
All lyrics are written by Joseph Mount; all music is composed by Mount, except where noted.

Small World track listing
No.	Title	Music	Length
1.	"Life and Death"		3:00
2.	"Things Will Be Fine"		3:30
3.	"It's Good to Be Back"		3:53
4.	"Loneliness on the Run"		3:39
5.	"Love Factory"		5:03
6.	"I Lost My Mind"		5:05
7.	"Right on Time"		3:44
8.	"Hold Me Tonight" (with Porridge Radio)	Dana Margolin; Mount	3:31
9.	"I Have Seen Enough"	Mount; Oscar Cash	3:32
Total length:			34:57

- All of the tracks except "Life and Death" and "Love Factory" are stylised in sentence case.

Small World (Special Edition) track listing
No.	Title	Remixer	Length
1.	"Life and Death"	Porij	2:41
2.	"Things Will Be Fine"	PPJ	3:31
3.	"It's Good to Be Back"	Panic Shack	3:15
4.	"Loneliness on the Run"	Nadeem Din-Gabisi; Tony Njoku	4:06
5.	"Love Factory"	Katy J Pearson	5:21
6.	"I Lost My Mind"	Jessica Winter	4:08
7.	"Right on Time"	Haich Ber Na	3:21
8.	"Hold Me Tonight"	Bolis Pupul	3:24
9.	"I Have Seen Enough"	Sébastien Tellier	3:32
Total length:			33:19

- All of the tracks except "Life and Death" and "Love Factory" are stylised in sentence case.

== Personnel ==
- Joseph Mount – drums, bass guitar, Roland Juno 60, Yamaha D85 Organ, Roland System 100, production
- Oscar Cash – piano, acoustic guitar, electric guitar, Yamaha D85 Organ
- Raven Bush – strings (7, 8)
- Dana Margolin – vocals (8)
- Ash Workman – production, mixing
- Matt Colton – mastering
- Kate Mount – sleeve photography
- Hazel Gaskin – Metronomy photography
- The Letter Press – design

== Charts ==
Chart performance for Small World
Chart (2022)	Peak position
Belgian Albums (Ultratop Flanders)	166
Belgian Albums (Ultratop Wallonia)	22
French Albums (SNEP)	27
German Albums (Offizielle Top 100)	50
Scottish Albums (OCC)	3
Swiss Albums (Schweizer Hitparade)	31
UK Albums (OCC)	7
