= Metronomy Forever =

Studio album by Metronomy
- Released: 13 September 2019
- Genres: Indietronica; funk
- Length: 54:43
- Label: Because
- Producers: Joseph Mount; Oscar Cash

Metronomy chronology
Summer 08 (2016)	Metronomy Forever (2019)	Small World (2022)

Singles from Metronomy Forever
- 1. "Lately" Released: 29 May 2019; 2. "Salted Caramel Ice Cream" Released: 19 June 2019; 3. "Walking in the Dark" Released: 24 July 2019; 4. "Wedding Bells" Released: 3 September 2019

Metronomy Forever is the sixth studio album by English electronic music band Metronomy. The album was preceded by four singles; "Lately", "Salted Caramel Ice Cream", "Walking in the Dark", and "Wedding Bells". Each single was released with a music video, the first three being directed by band frontman Joseph Mount, and "Wedding Bells" being directed by Ben Hanratty. The album was released on 13 September 2019 by Because Music.

Two more songs received music videos after the album's release; "Insecurity" on 13 November 2019, and "Whitsand Bay" on 21 February 2020.

== Production and Recording ==
The majority of the album was written and recorded by Mount while moving from Paris to Kent with his family. While his new home did feature a recording studio, Mount said the album was "kind of done" by the time it was ready. However, after an underwhelming response from his record label, he reworked the material he had into what shows up on the final album. Joseph began work on this album shortly after his work on Robyn's 2018 album Honey, having co-written and co-produced several songs on that record. His experience on that album greatly influenced his outlook and mindset going into Forever. The heavy emotions of Honey greatly contrasted with Mount's personal life, which he described as "happy".

"I did this thing that was so emotionally involved with Robyn for her record, and I came out thinking as though I almost needed this trauma to make a record. And I don’t have that – I’m just happy,..." -Joseph Mount

It was ultimately this contrast that Mount said fueled the creation of Metronomy Forever. "You can be super happy while still being a bit despairing", Mount said in an interview. The resulting album is a mix of more up-beat Pop songs and darker Lo-fi instrumentals, with song topics ranging from the joy of weddings to feelings of insecurity.

The album marks a slight change in musical direction on some tracks, such as 'Insecurity'' and ''Lately'' featuring a more guitar led sound.

The name "Metronomy Forever" has two meanings according to Mount. The first relates to his concerns about his and the band's legacy, the second being a tongue-in-cheek reference to the album's run-time. The long track list of the album was partly by design. Mount wanted the album to play like a radio station or an auto-generated playlist.

== Critical reception ==
Professional ratings
Aggregate scores
Source	Rating
Metacritic	78/100
Review scores
Source	Rating
AllMusic	3.5/5 stars
The Independent	4/5 stars
NME	4/5 stars
Pitchfork	6.7/10

Metronomy Forever received generally positive reviews from music critics. At Metacritic, which assigns a normalised rating out of 100 to reviews from mainstream publications, the album received an average score of 78, based on 15 reviews.

=== Accolades ===
Accolades for Metronomy Forever
Publication	Accolade	Rank	Ref.
Gigwise	Top 51 Albums of 2019	25	
Les Inrocks	Top 100 Albums of 2019	29	
Louder Than War	Top 50 Albums of 2019	44	
Rough Trade	Top 100 Albums of 2019	34	
Under the Radar	Top 100 Albums of 2019	61	

== Track listing ==
All tracks are written and produced by Joseph Mount, except where noted.

Metronomy Forever track listing
No.	Title	Writer(s)	Producer(s)	Length
1.	"Wedding"			1:01
2.	"Whitsand Bay"			3:51
3.	"Insecurity"			3:54
4.	"Salted Caramel Ice Cream"		Joseph Mount; Pierre Rousseau^{[a]}	3:30
5.	"Driving"			0:49
6.	"Lately"		Mount; Rousseau^{[a]}	3:15
7.	"Lying Low"			3:56
8.	"Forever Is a Long Time"			2:29
9.	"The Light"	Joseph Mount; Martin Hadley	Mount; Ash Workman^{[a]}	4:33
10.	"Sex Emoji"		Mount; Mr. Oizo^{[a]}	4:23
11.	"Walking in the Dark"			3:04
12.	"Insecure"			1:16
13.	"Miracle Rooftop"			4:43
14.	"Upset My Girlfriend"			4:28
15.	"Wedding Bells"			4:19
16.	"Lately (Going Spare)"	Mount; Oscar Cash	Mount; Cash	3:40
17.	"Ur Mixtape"			1:39
Total length:				54:43

Japanese edition bonus tracks
No.	Title	Length
18.	"Mellow Brass (Lately / Whitsand Bay)"	4:42
19.	"Distant Horn (Salted Caramel Ice Cream)"	3:45
Total length:		63:21

=== Notes ===
- ^{^[a]} signifies an additional producer

== Personnel ==
Credits adapted from the liner notes of Metronomy Forever.

- Joseph Mount – production (all tracks); mixing (tracks 1, 5, 8, 11–14, 16, 17)
- Ash Workman – mixing (tracks 2, 9); additional production (track 9)
- Anna Prior – backing vocals (track 2)
- Jamie Snell – mixing (tracks 3, 4, 6, 7)
- Pierre Rousseau – additional production (tracks 4, 6)
- Mr. Oizo – additional production (track 10)
- Dave Fridmann – mixing (track 15)
- Oscar Cash – production, mixing (track 16)
- Matt Colton – mastering
- Anne Zeum – artwork
- Aaron Larney – layout
- Grégoire Alexandre – photography

== Charts ==
Chart performance for Metronomy Forever
Chart (2019)	Peak position
Belgian Albums (Ultratop Flanders)	78
Belgian Albums (Ultratop Wallonia)	28
French Albums (SNEP)	19
German Albums (Offizielle Top 100)	68
Irish Albums (IRMA)	78
Portuguese Albums (AFP)	25
Scottish Albums (Official Charts)	18
Spanish Albums (Promusicae)	54
Swiss Albums (Schweizer Hitparade)	32
UK Albums (Official Charts)	15
