= Mind Enterprises =

Italian music duo

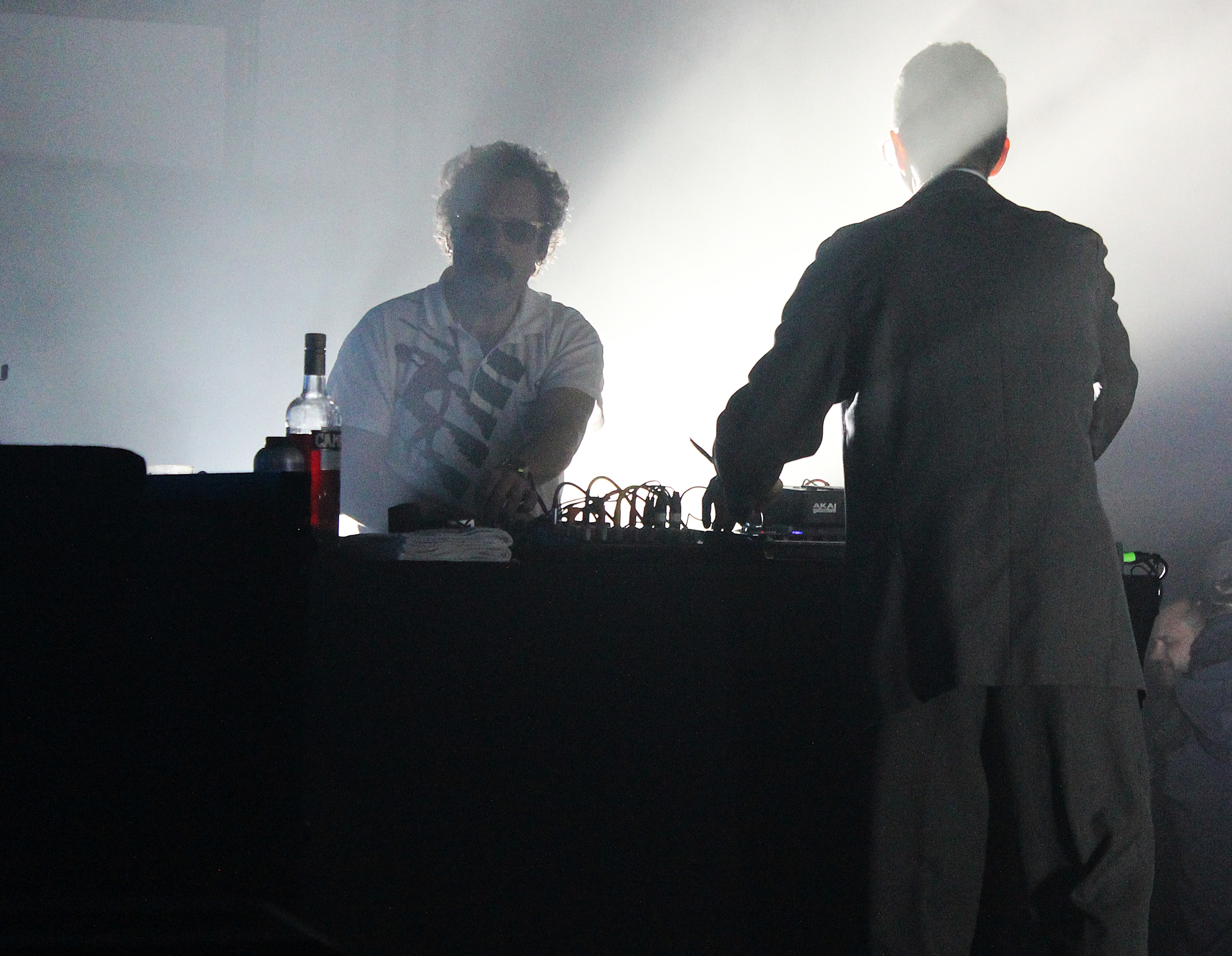

Background information
- Genres: Italo disco; techno; electro
- Members: Andrea Tirone; Roberto Conigliaro
- Website: mindenterprises.co.uk

Mind Enterprises is an Italian music duo consisting of Andrea Tirone and Roberto Conigliaro. Their music is a mix of Italo disco, techno, and '90s electro. Starting with their 2012 debut single "Summer War", they have released several singles as well as an album titled Idealist (2016), mostly on the Because Music label. In or around 2025, they became the subject of viral social media memes.
