= Selah Sue =

Belgian musician and songwriter

- Selah Sue and the Galland at the 2026 Montreux Jazz Festival

Background information
- Born: Sanne Greet A. Putseys; 3 May 1989 (age 37); Leefdaal, Belgium
- Origin: Leuven, Belgium
- Genres: Soul; reggae; pop; R&B
- Occupation: Musician
- Instruments: Guitar; vocals
- Website: selahsue.com

Sanne Greet A. Putseys (Dutch pronunciation: [ˈsɑnə pʏtˈsɛis]; born 3 May 1989), known professionally as Selah Sue, is a Belgian musician and songwriter. Her debut album, Selah Sue (2011), was a major success, selling over 720,000 copies in Europe, 320,000 in France alone.

In 2011, she had chart success with the hit singles "Raggamuffin", "Crazy Vibes" and "This World". In 2011, Selah Sue won a European Border Breakers Award (EBBA). In January 2012 during the EBBA award ceremony she was presented with the EBBA Public Choice Award.

On 28 August 2012, her debut album was also released in the United States, where the album received positive reviews. More than 400,000 downloads were counted in one week. Rolling Stone magazine named Selah Sue as one of the new faces of 2012.

== Background ==
Sanne Putseys was born in Leefdaal, province of Flemish Brabant, near the provincial capital Leuven. At the age of fifteen, she learned to play the acoustic guitar and started to write her own songs as well. When she was seventeen a Belgian producer asked her to sing some demos of his songs, after which Universal offered her a contract. She refused, because she wanted to sing her own songs. At the same time she performed as the youngest and only female artist at the open-song contest Open Mic-avond at Het Depot in Leuven. Organizer and singer Milow (born Jonathan Vandenbroeck) had noticed her talents and asked her to perform in his supporting programme. Initially, Putseys managed to work out her musical career path while studying psychology at the Katholieke Universiteit Leuven. According to her, studying psychology helped her to understand more about human emotions, which also is something that she has to deal with in her musical activities. Eventually, she continued doing warm-up performances in collaboration with artists such as Jamie Lidell in London and Paris. Furthermore, she played with the Belgian band Novastar at the Paradiso in Amsterdam.

Selah Sue often covers songs of Erykah Badu and The Zutons, but she has assembled a whole range of her own songs. Two of her well-known songs are "Mommy" and "Black Part Love", both of which are carried out acoustically. She says that she is influenced by artists such as Lauryn Hill, M.I.A., Erykah Badu., Nneka, Meshel Ndegeocello, The Fugees.

== Commercial success ==
Sue's first EP was released in January 2009, under the title Black Part Love. From September 2008 until August 2009, Selah Sue received some curricular guidance from the Belgian musical theater, Ancienne Belgique. The programme, in which she was involved, has been set up to support promising artists who aren't associated with any record company or other kinds of managing assistance. In 2009, Selah Sue attended the stages of the North Sea Jazz Festival and Lowlands. Additionally, she regularly appears on TV shows such as De Wereld Draait Door on Dutch television and several other Flemish TV shows.

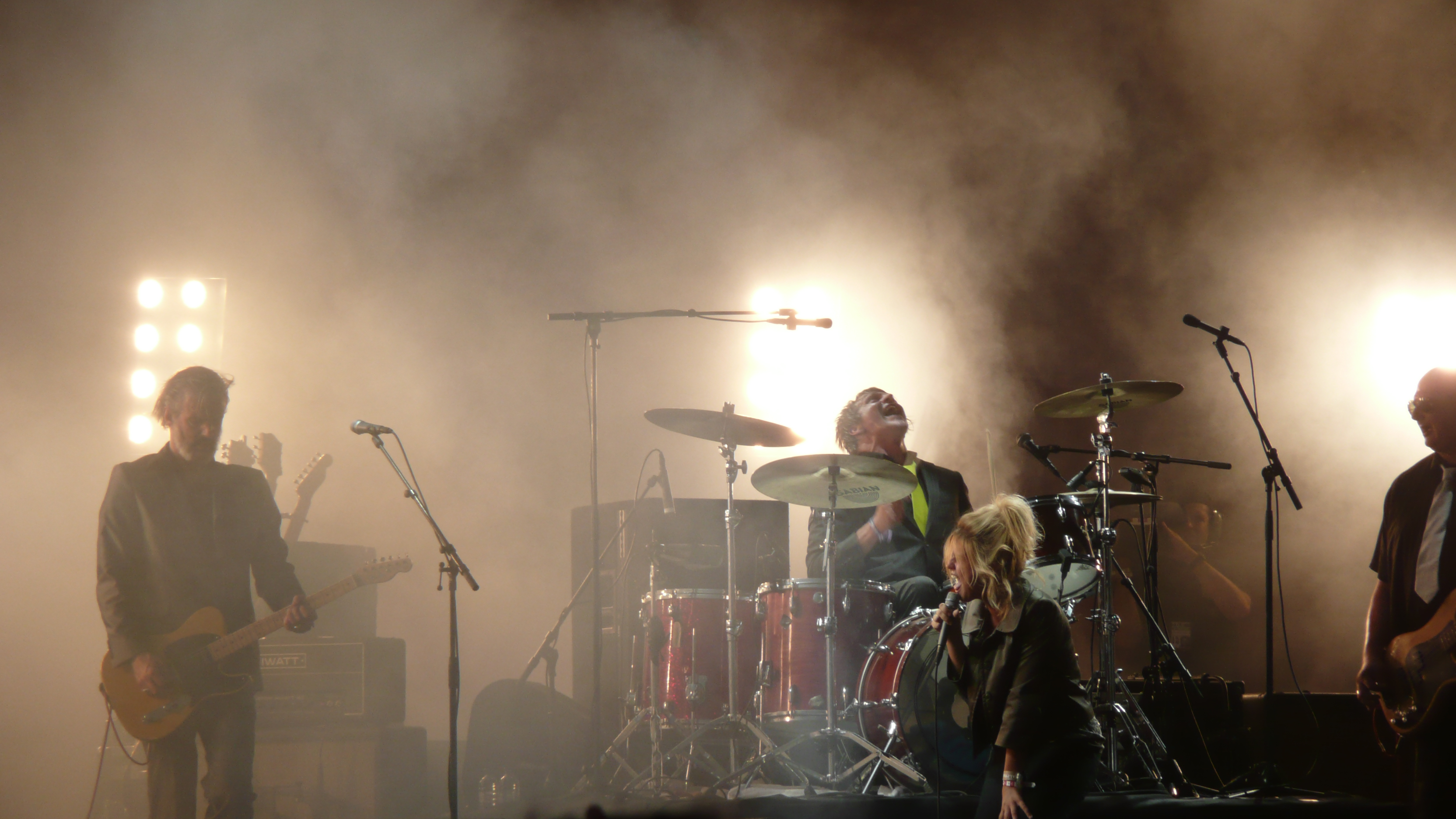
Sue sitting in with Triggerfinger 20 August 2010

In 2010, she played most of the biggest festivals in Belgium, including Les Nuits Botaniques, Les Ardentes, Dour Festival, Lokerse Feesten, Couleur Café and Pukkelpop. But also outside her native country in big festivals such as Lowlands in the Netherlands, Eurockéennes in France and Sziget Festival (Hungary). Her second EP, Raggamuffin, was released in October 2010. On 8 November 2010 she played a support appearance for Prince on his Sportpaleis concert. She then went on a mostly sold out headlining show in Belgium, France and the Netherlands, presenting her forthcoming debut album.

On 4 March 2011, Selah Sue released her eponymous debut album. The album has peaked at number one on the Belgium Albums Chart and has also charted in the Netherlands, France and Switzerland. Besides several hit singles, such as "This World" and "Crazy Vibes", the album also contains a duet with Cee Lo Green, called "Please". On 10 December 2011, she won three prizes at the Flemish Music Industry Awards.

On 20 October 2012, Selah Sue played at the royal wedding in Luxembourg. She recorded a version of "Spoonful" for a Häagen-Dazs commercial featuring Bradley Cooper.

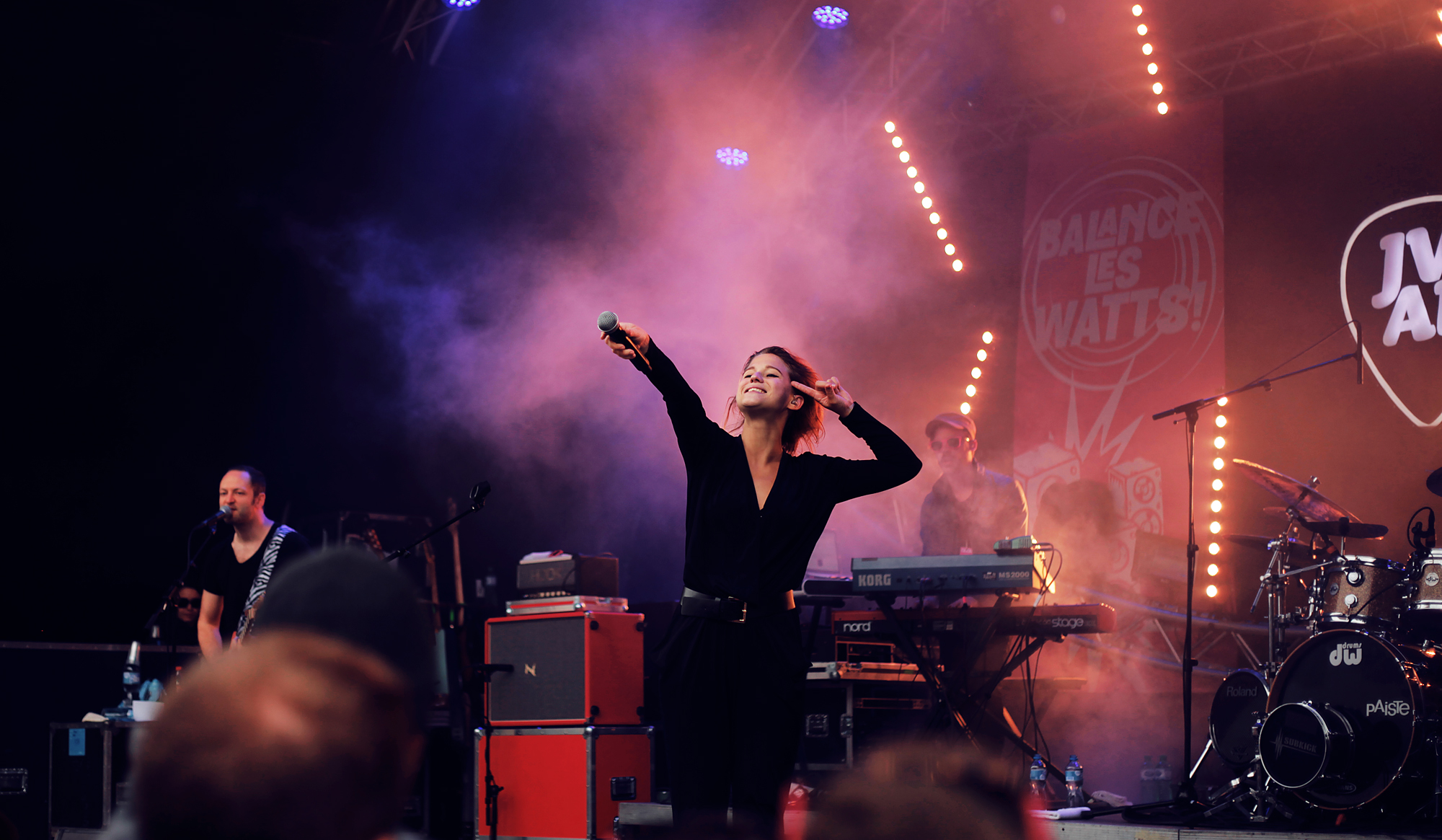
Sue during her concert at the Jval Festival in Switzerland, 31 August 2014.

On 27 October 2014, Selah Sue released a new song, "Alone". The song was a commercial success and reached number 1 in Wallonia and was a top 10 hit in Flanders and France. Together, featuring American musician Childish Gambino. It also featured a collaboration with Scottish producer and DJ Hudson Mohawke. The album reached number 1 in both Flanders and Wallonia as well in The Netherlands. She was nominated for 3 prizes at the 2015 Music Industry Awards and ultimately won the award for Best solo female artist, already for the fifth time.

Selah Sue co-wrote Belgium's Eurovision Song Contest 2016 entry, "What's the Pressure" performed by Laura Tesoro. The song finished 10th in the competition. In December 2016 "Bang Bang", a collaboration by DJ Fresh and Diplo, was released and featured vocals by Selah Sue. The song also features vocals by R. City and Craig David.

In 2020, after a hiatus of 5 years, Selah Sue released the EP "Bedroom" on 15 May. The song "You" was released as the first official single of the EP on 17 April 2020 and was dedicated to her family. Before the release of the EP Selah Sue hosted a livestream concert series from her bedroom called "Lullaby Sessions" because of the COVID-19 pandemic.

== Personal life ==
In May 2014 Selah Sue made public that she has been struggling with depression in the Flemish talkshow "Reyers Laat". She admitted that she has been using medication since she was 18 years old. She stated that antidepressants helped her to be the person she is now and that it helped her to achieve her success. Her confession came shortly after a documentary about antidepressant was broadcast in Flanders. She showed support for campaigns in Flanders to help youngsters who are suffering from depression. In 2016 she was the godmother of "Te Gek!?", a campaign on Flemish schools to give depression among young people more visibility.

In October 2016, Selah Sue announced through a video on Facebook that she was expecting her first child. In March 2017, she announced that her first son, Seth, had been born. In March 2019 her second son Mingus was born.

In 2021 she stopped antidepressants and started with using magic truffles

In August 11, 2022 she stated that she had to go back to antidepressants via 2 posts on instagram.

== Discography ==
=== Albums ===
==== Studio albums ====
List of studio albums, with selected details, chart positions and certifications
| Title | Details | Peak chart positions | | | | | | | | | Certifications |
| Title | Details | BEL (FL) | BEL (WA) | FRA | GER | HUN | NLD | POL | SWI | US Heat | Certifications |
|---|---|---|---|---|---|---|---|---|---|---|---|
| Selah Sue | Released: 4 March 2011; Label: Because Music; Format: CD, digital download, streaming | 1 | 1 | 9 | — | — | 2 | 31 | 32 | 8 | BEA: 4× Platinum; NVPI: Gold; SNEP: 2× Platinum; ZPAV: Platinum |
| Reason | Released: 30 March 2015; Label: Because Music; Format: CD, LP, digital download, streaming | 1 | 1 | 3 | 82 | 36 | 1 | 23 | 9 | — | BEA: Gold |
| Persona | Released: 25 March 2022; Label: Because Music; Format: CD, LP, digital download, streaming | 5 | 4 | 18 | — | — | 15 | — | 34 | — | |
| Movin' (with the Gallands) | Released: 20 March 2026; Label: Because Music, Virgin; Format: CD, LP, digital download, streaming | 6 | 12 | — | — | — | — | — | — | — | |
"—" denotes items which were not released in that country or failed to chart.

==== Compilation albums ====
List of compilation albums, with selected details and chart positions
| Title | Details | Peak chart positions |
| Title | Details | FRA |
|---|---|---|
| Rarities | Released: 5 November 2012; Label: Because Music; Format: CD, LP, digital download, streaming | 57 |

==== Remixes albums ====
List of remixes albums, with selected details
| Title | Details |
|---|---|
| Reason Remixes | Released: 27 November 2015; Label: Because Music; Format: CD, LP, digital download, streaming |

=== Extended plays ===
List of extended plays, with selected details
| Title | Details | Peak chart positions | | |
| Title | Details | BEL (FL) | BEL (WA) | FRA |
|---|---|---|---|---|
| iTunes Festival: London 2011 | Released: 25 July 2011; Label: Because Music; Format: Digital download, streaming | — | — | 102 |
| Alone | Released: 1 December 2014; Label: Because Music; Format: Digital download, streaming | — | — | — |
| Bedroom | Released: 15 May 2020; Label: Because Music; Format: Digital download, streaming | 17 | 61 | 159 |
"—" denotes items which were not released in that country or failed to chart.

=== Singles ===
==== As lead artist ====
| Single | Year | Peak chart positions | | | | | Certifications | Album |
| Single | Year | BEL (FL) | BEL (WA) | FRA | NLD | SWI | Certifications | Album |
|---|---|---|---|---|---|---|---|---|
| "Raggamuffin" | 2010 | 29 | 16 | 18 | 81 | — | BEA: Gold | Selah Sue |
| "Crazy Vibes" | 2011 | 21 | 26 | 74 | 56 | — | BEA: Gold | Selah Sue |
| "This World" | 2011 | 2 | 15 | 33 | — | 42 | BEA: Platinum | Selah Sue |
| "Summertime" | 2011 | — (Note: "Summertime" did not enter the Belgian (FL) Ultratop 50 Singles chart, but peaked at number 9 on the Ultratip chart.) | — (Note: "Summertime" did not enter the Belgian (WA) Ultratop 50 Singles chart, but peaked at number 17 on the Ultratip chart.) | — | — | — | | Selah Sue |
| "Zanna" (with Tom Barman vs. The Subs) | 2011 | 1 | 29 | — | 77 | — | BEA: Gold | Rarities |
| "Crazy Sufferin Style" | 2012 | — (Note: "Crazt Sufferin Style" did not enter the Belgian (FL) Ultratop 50 Singles chart, but peaked at number 9 on the Ultratip chart.) | — (Note: "Crazy Sufferin Style" did not enter the Belgian (WA) Ultratop 50 Singles chart, but peaked at number 33 on the Ultratip chart.) | — | — | — | | Rarities |
| "Fade Away" | 2012 | — (Note: "Fade Away" did not enter the Belgian (FL) Ultratop 50 Singles chart, but peaked at number 1 on the Ultratip chart.) | — (Note: "Fade Away" did not enter the Belgian (WA) Ultratop 50 Singles chart, but peaked at number 9 on the Ultratip chart.) | — | — | — | | Rarities |
| "Alone" | 2014 | 5 | 1 | 9 | 53 | — | BEA: Gold | Reason |
| "Reason" | 2015 | — (Note: "Reason" did not enter the Belgian (FL) Ultratop 50 Singles chart, but peaked at number 2 on the Ultratip chart.) | 41 | 115 | — | — | | Reason |
| "I Won't Go for More" | 2015 | — (Note: "I Won't Go for More" did not enter the Belgian (FL) Ultratop 50 Singles chart, but peaked at number 4 on the Ultratip chart.) | — (Note: "I Won't Go for More" did not enter the Belgian (WA) Ultratop 50 Singles chart, but peaked at number 16 on the Ultratip chart.) | 191 | — | — | | Reason |
| "Fear Nothing" | 2015 | — (Note: "Fear Nothing" did not enter the Belgian (FL) Ultratop 50 Singles chart, but peaked at number 2 on the Ultratip chart.) | — | — | — | — | | Reason |
| "Together" (featuring Childish Gambino) | 2016 | 46 | — | — | — | — | | Reason |
| "So This Is Love" | 2017 | — (Note: "So This Is Love" did not enter the Belgian (FL) Ultratop 50 Singles chart, but peaked at number 1 on the Ultratip chart.) | — (Note: "So This Is Love" did not enter the Belgian (WA) Ultratop 50 Singles chart, but peaked at number 32 on the Ultratip chart.) | — | — | — | | Jazz Loves Disney 2: A Kind of Magic |
| "You" | 2020 | 43 | — (Note: "You" did not enter the Belgian (WA) Ultratop 50 Singles chart, but peaked at number 20 on the Ultratip chart.) | — | — | — | | Bedroom EP |
| "Always – Cosmo" | 2020 | — (Note: "Always – Cosmo" did not enter the Belgian (FL) Ultratop 50 Singles chart, but peaked at number 26 on the Ultratip chart.) | — | — | — | — | | Bedroom EP |
| "Free Fall" | 2021 | — | — | — | — | — | | Persona |
| "Hurray" (featuring TOBi) | 2021 | 48 | — | — | — | — | | Persona |
| "Pills" | 2022 | 22 | — | — | — | — | | Persona |
| "When It All Falls Down" | 2023 | — | 42 | — | — | — | | Non-album single |
"—" denotes items which were not released in that country or failed to chart.

==== As featured artist ====
| Single | Year | Peak chart positions | | Album |
| Single | Year | BEL (FL) | BEL (WA) Tip | Album |
|---|---|---|---|---|
| "Faces" (Patrice featuring Selah Sue) | 2014 | — (Note: "Faces" did not enter the Belgian (FL) Ultratop 50 Singles chart, but peaked at number 84 on the Ultratip chart.) | — | The Rising of the Son |
| "At Sea Again" (Slime featuring Selah Sue) | 2015 | — | — | Company |
| "Can't Take My Eyes Off You" (Walk of the Earth featuring Selah Sue) | 2016 | — | — | N/A |
| "A Million Ways" (Pomrad featuring Selah Sue) | 2016 | — | — | Knights |
| "Bang Bang" (DJ Fresh vs Diplo featuring R. City, Selah Sue and Craig David) | 2016 | 35 | — | —N/a |
| "Pull the Strings" (Maverick featuring Selah Sue) | 2017 | — | 47 | —N/a |
| "The Minute" (Maverick featuring Selah Sue) | 2018 | — | — | —N/a |
| "Que sera sera" (Marcus Miller featuring Selah Sue) | 2018 | — | — | Laid Black |
| "Guy-Funk" (Zwangere Guy featuring Selah Sue) | 2019 | — (Note: "Guy-Funk" did not enter the Belgian (FL) Ultratop 50 Singles chart, but peaked at number 2 on the Ultratip chart.) | 38 | Wie is Guy? |
"—" denotes items which were not released in that country or failed to chart.
