= Pip Paine (Pay the £5000 You Owe) =

Studio album by Metronomy
- Released: 14 February 2005
- Recorded: 2002–2004
- Genre: Electronic, experimental
- Length: 50:46
- Label: Holiphonic
- Producer: Joseph Mount

Metronomy chronology
Pip Paine (Pay the £5000 You Owe) (2005)	Nights Out (2008)

Alternative cover
- 2006 reissue cover

Professional ratings
Review scores
Source	Rating
AllMusic	4/5 stars

Pip Paine (Pay the £5000 You Owe) is the debut album by the British electronic act Metronomy, originally released on 14 February 2005 by Holiphonic Records in the UK.

On first release, 500 copies were produced with the CD in a special cloth case with an illustration by the artist Rose de Borman. It was later reissued in June 2006 in standard gatefold card format with a plain text cover. In April 2013, a limited edition vinyl with the original embossed fabric casing and artwork was released.

The name of the album comes from a vehicle wrecker named Adrian Broadway, who lived in producer Joseph Mount's town of Totnes who claimed he was owed money by a man called Pip Paine. The wrecker would leave wrecked cars around Totnes along with the proclamation "Pip Paine, Pay The £5000 You Owe". A hearse was often seen parked opposite Totnes railway station with this message painted on the side. Joseph describes the album as "the sound of someone living in a musically redundant place trying to make exciting music."

Mount was influenced by an eclectic group of artists whilst he wrote the album, including Frank Zappa, Aphex Twin, LFO, Talking Heads, Les Rythmes Digitales and Kraftwerk.

== Track listing ==
All tracks are written by Joseph Mount.

No.	Title	Length
1.	"You Could Easily Have Me"	3:07
2.	"Love Song For Dog"	3:19
3.	"Danger Song"	4:41
4.	"This Could Be Beautiful (It Is)"	4:10
5.	"Black Eye/Burnt Thumb"	4:43
6.	"Peter's Pan"	5:22
7.	"Trick or Treatz"	4:41
8.	"The 3rd"	3:56
9.	"1 String Strung"	2:43
10.	"Bearcan"	6:38
11.	"How Say"	4:29
12.	"New Toy" (hidden track)	2:57
Total length:		50:46

2009 expanded edition bonus tracks
No.	Title	Length
13.	"Are Mums Mates"	2:15
14.	"In the D.O.D"	3:18
15.	"Hear to Wear"	3:28
16.	"Another Me to Mother You"	4:14
Total length:		64:01
