= Olugbenga Adelekan =

Nigerian music producer

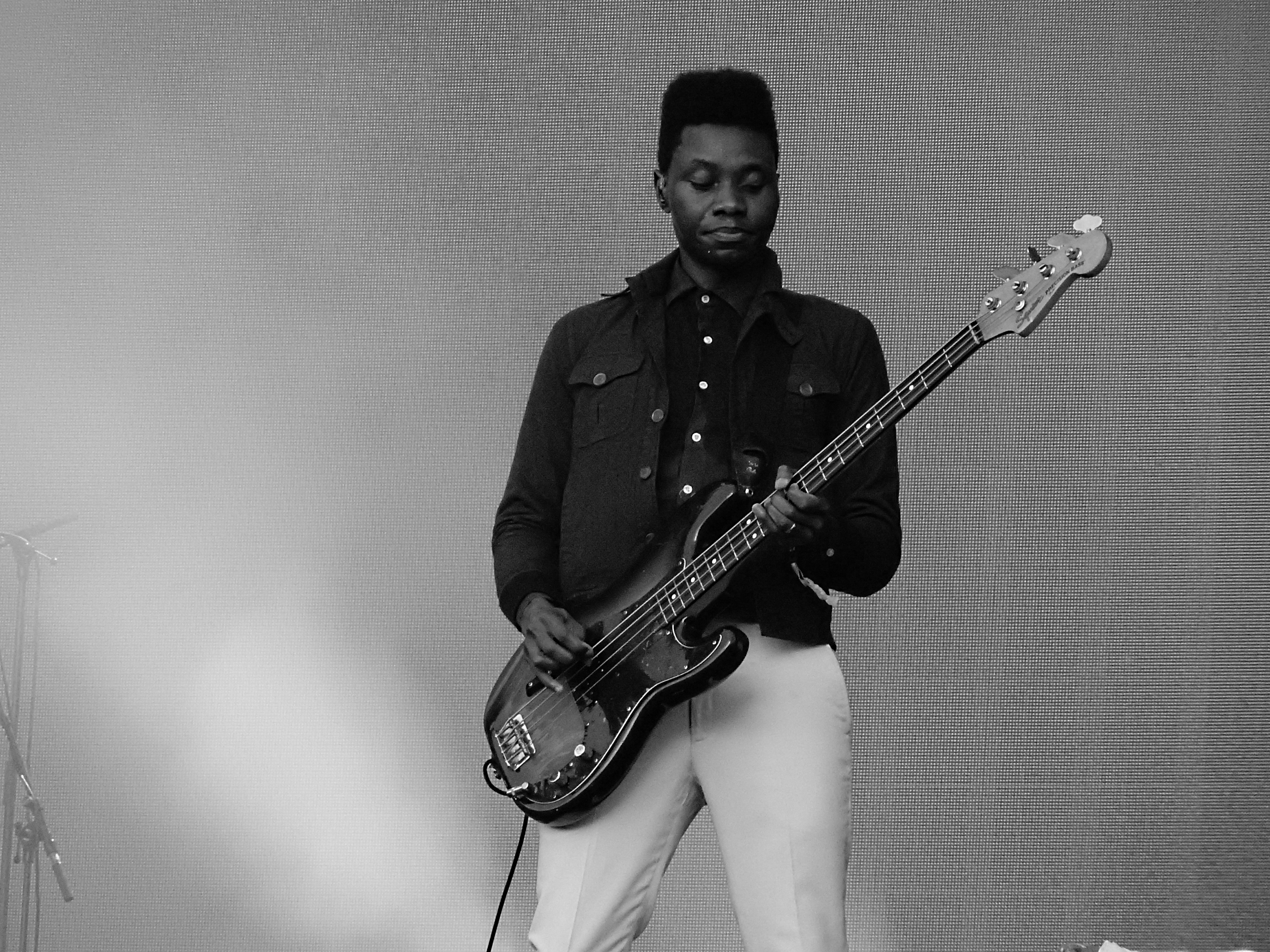
- Adelekan performing with Metronomy at British Summer Time Hyde Park in June 2015

Background information
- Also known as: Olugbenga
- Born: Lagos, Nigeria
- Occupations: Musician, producer
- Instrument: Bass
- Member of: Metronomy

Olugbenga Adelekan, also known as Olugbenga, is a Nigerian-born, English-based music producer. Olugbenga performs as a solo artist and as the bass player of the Mercury Music Prize Award-nominated band Metronomy.

== Biography ==
Born in Lagos, Nigeria, Olugbenga moved with his family to The Hague, The Netherlands before returning to Nigeria in his teens. At the age of 16 he settled in England, where he started making original music.

Olugbenga studied English literature at King's College, Cambridge.

He is married and has children. Olugbenga's brother Seye Adelekan is also a professional musician, playing with Gorillaz as their live bassist.

== Live performances ==
In 2012, Olugbenga toured Asia, Australia, Russia and the UK, as well as festivals across Europe including Field Day (UK), Dot to Dot Festival (UK), off Sonar (Spain), Soundwave Festival (Croatia), Kendal Calling (UK) and Summer Sundae Weekender (UK).

Olugbenga performs using Ableton Live and MIDI controllers.

== Personal life ==
Adelekan has two children, Ravi and Maya. In 2022, Adelekan released a charity single alongside Ravi after Ravi underwent surgery to remove a benign tumour from his brain. The single also featured Bastille (band) and Paloma Faith. In 2024, Adelekan, Ravi and his family appeared on the seventeenth series of Britain's Got Talent under the name Ravi's Dream Team, alongside a group of doctors, teachers and other children with brain tumours. The group reached the Semi-Finals of the show.

== Discography ==
Olugbenga has released music both under his own name and under Eku Fantasy, his side project with Gareth Jones aka Jumping Back Slash (No relation to Gareth Jones). He has also done remixes of several artists' songs.

=== Under "Olugbenga Adelekan" ===
- Epic & Blues EP (August 1, 2012)
- Hafiza [INNOCENCE] (May 20, 2013)

=== Eku Fantasy ===
- EF1 EP(April 20, 2018)
- Ayodele EP (December 3, 2020)

=== Remixes ===
- Pink Violence - "Untitled [OLUGBENGA Edit]" (2011)
- Youthless - "Golden Age" [Olubenga edit] (2011)
- Ezra Bang & Hot Machine - "Cadillac" [Olubenga edit] (2011)
- Tallulah Rendall - "Ghost On The Water" [Olubenga edit] (2011)
- Error Operator - "Mistakes Mk3" [Olubengla glossilalia edit] (2011)
- Napoleon IIIrd "This Town/I Try/Leaving Copenhagen" [Olubenga edit] ft. Karl Nova (2011)
- Esben and the Witch "Hexagons IV" [Olubenga edit], (2011)
- Ghostpoet "Liiines" [Olubenga ares edit] (2011)
- Three Trapped Tigers "Reset" [Olubenga edit] (2011)
- Diagrams "Hill" [Olubenga edit] (2011)
- Jim Kroft - "Ulysses" [Olubenga edit] (2012)
- Seye "White Noise" [Olubenga edit], Stranger Records (2012)

== General references ==
1. ^ Malt Andy (23 July 2012)"Approved: Olugbenga – Epic & Blues EP " CMU. Retrieved 31 July 2012.
2. ^ Torabi Genevieve (24 July 2012) EPIC & BLUES EXCLUSIVE Dazed. Retrieved 31 July 2012
3. ^ On the Horizon: Epic & Blues, Olugbenga. Dots & Dashes Retrieved 31 July 2012
4. ^ Murray Robin (16 July 2012) Of The Day 16/7- Olugbenga Epic & Blues EP - Ulysses Clash. Retrieved 31 July 2012
5. ^ Searles Graham (19 July 2012) MP3: OLUGBENGA Mixmag. Retrieved 31 July 2012
6. ^ Red Bull Studios London (19 July 2012) Mix: Olugbenga Redbull Studio. Retrieved 31 July 2012
7. ^ download new music by Olugbenga (Metronomy) MOBO. Retrieved 31 July 2012
8. ^ to Dot/Olugbenga Subculture. Retrieved 31 July 2012
