= Salva (music producer) =

American producer and DJ

- Born: Paul Salva. Jr.
- Genres: Rap, Dance, Pop
- Occupations: Record Producer, DJ
- Years active: 2005–present
- Label: Peacemaker

Paul Salva Jr., better known by his stage name Salva, is an American record producer based in Los Angeles, California. Known for his signature blend of Rap and Electronic music, Salva's remixes and bootlegs are some of the highest rotated amongst club and radio DJs worldwide. His remix of Kanye West's "Mercy" with RL Grime held the #1 most popular track on SoundCloud in June 2012, continuing to enjoy worldwide success and helping propel his artist career. Salva has since produced and collaborated with artists such as Young Thug, Future, Wiz Khalifa, E-40, DJ Shadow, Yuna, Chuck Ellis, Boys Noize, has songwriting credit on the Grammy-nominated album Oxymoron by Schoolboy Q (TDE/Interscope) and music appearing in films such as the 2014 box office record-breaker Transformers: Age of Extinction.

== Career ==
February 2011 saw the release of Salva's first studio album, Complex Housing on LA-based indie label Friends of Friends, receiving first reviews from The FADER, Pitchfork Media, Fact Magazine, and Resident Advisor. Complex Housing led to his acceptance into the 2011 Red Bull Music Academy in Madrid, Spain where he studied and collaborated with icons including Nile Rodgers, Manny Fresh, Tony Visconti, RZA and others, and where he met his future collaborator and mentor Robin Hannibal.

In 2012, Salva released his collaborative remix of Kanye West's "Mercy" with RL Grime. which almost immediately went into rotation on Power 106 (105.9 FM Los Angeles) as well as Salva's first Power 106 "Jump Off" mix. His affinity for Radio led him to be a resident DJ on BBC Radio 1's "In New DJs We Trust" broadcasting from London, and to do guest mixes for other stations such as Power 106, Sirius XM/Shade 45, Rinse FM, Dash Radio and more.

Salva has officially remixed songs for artists such as Rihanna, Matt & Kim, Boys Noize, Jamie Lidell, Nelly Furtado, The Glitch Mob, Problem, Sage The Gemini, Chromeo, and Shlohmo. He is the founder of the now-defunct Frite Nite record label.

Salva performed live shows with Pusha T at both Winter Music Conference and SXSW. In February 2013, Salva released an EP titled Odd Furniture on Friends of Friends.

In October 2014, Salva released the Peacemaker mixtape. Recorded in Red Bull studios in Los Angeles, it featured guest appearances from the likes of Kurupt, E-40, Schoolboy Q, Bad Lucc, Ballout, Freddie Gibbs, and Problem.

== Style and influences ==
Salva is primarily known for his work in hip-hop and dance music, drawing from a variety of influences including house, freestyle, boogie funk, and Miami bass.

== Discography ==
=== Studio albums ===
- Complex Housing (2011)
- Clips (2017)
- Clips 2 (2018)

=== Mixtapes ===
- Peacemaker (2014)
- Peacemaker 2 (2018)

=== EPs ===
- Yellobone (2011)
- Odd Furniture (2013)

=== Singles ===
- "Wake the Dead" b/w "Forest Floor" (2011) (with Grenier)
- "Motivated" (2014) (with Problem)
- "A.D.D." (2015) (with Mr. Carmack)
- "Saw The Light" (2016) (feat. Winston Howard)
- "All My Life" (2017) (feat. YG & RJ)

=== Remixes ===
- Norrit – "Nobody Baby (Salva Remix)" (2010)
- Robot Koch – "Dough featuring Addiquit (Salva Remix)" (2010)
- Miguel Migs – "Close Your Eyes featuring Meshell Ndegeocello (Salva Remix)" (2011)
- Om Unit – "Prawn Cocktail (Salva Remix)" (2011)
- Hydraulix – "From the Bottom (Salva Remix)" (2012)
- Para One – "Lean on Me featuring Teki Latex (Salva Remix)" (2012)
- Nelly Furtado – "Parking Lot (Salva + Kuru Remix)" (2012)
- Jamie Lidell – "What a Shame (RL Grime & Salva Remix)" (2013)
- Matt & Kim – "It's Alright (Salva's Synth Pop Remix)" (2013)
- Chromeo – "Sexy Socialite (Salva Remix)" (2014)
- Banks - "Begging For Thread (Salva Remix)" (2015)
- Rihanna – "Needed Me (Salva Remix)" (2016)
- Rihanna - "Sex With Me (Salva Remix)" (2017)
- Rihanna - "Pose (Salva Remix)" (2017)
- Banks - "Gemini Feed (Salva Remix)" (2017)
- Deftones - "Rx Queen (Salva Remix)" (2020)
