= Metronomy =

English electronic music group

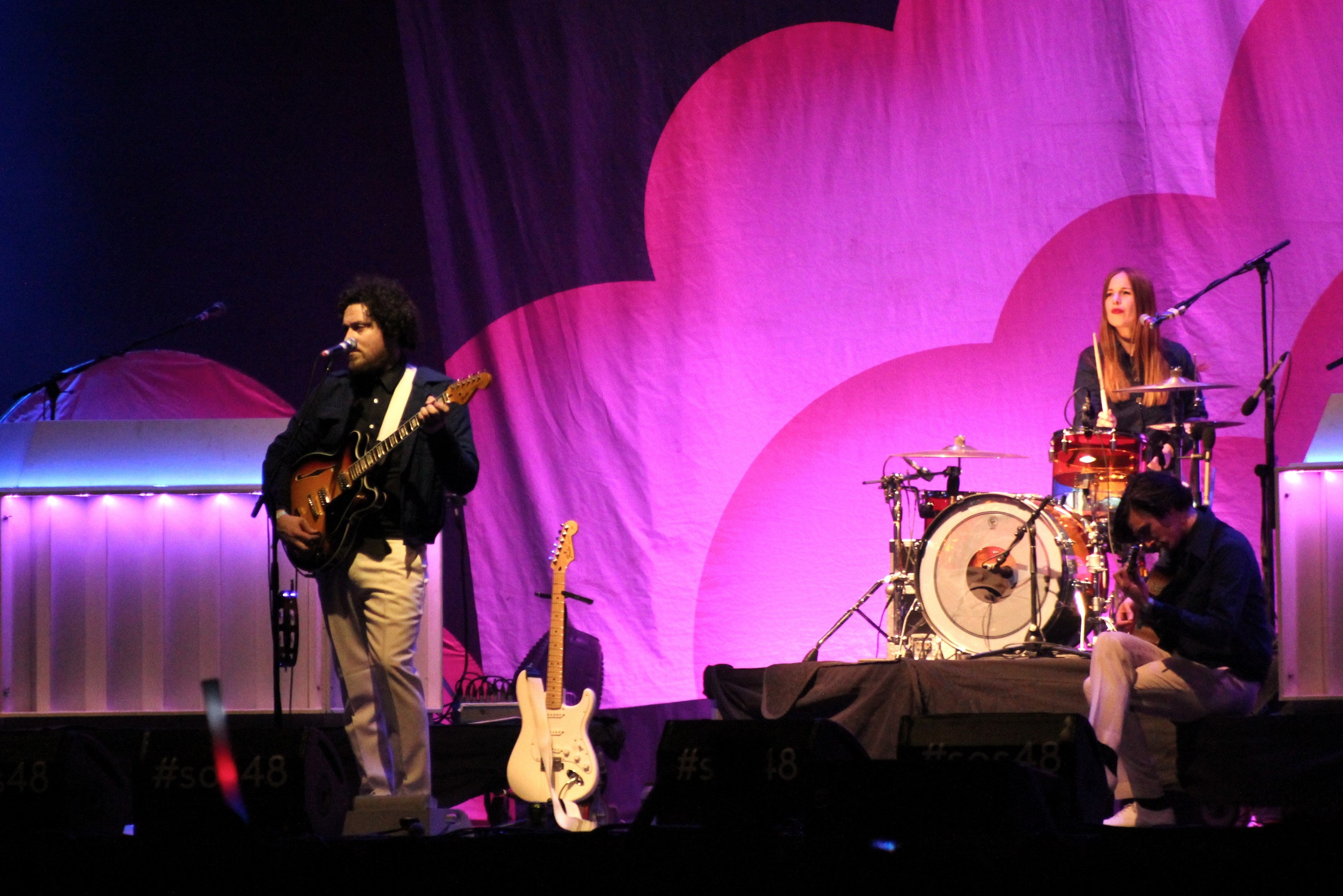
- Metronomy performing in May 2015

Background information
- Origin: Totnes, England
- Genres: Nu-disco, indietronica, new wave, indie pop, electronic rock, wonky pop
- Years active: 1999–present
- Labels: Ninja Tune, Because Music, Need Now Future, Holiphonic
- Members: Joseph Mount; Oscar Cash; Anna Prior; Olugbenga Adelekan; Michael Lovett
- Past members: Gabriel Stebbing
- Website: metronomy.co.uk

Metronomy are an English electronic music band, formed in Totnes in 1999. Their lineup consists of founding member and leader Joseph Mount (vocals, keyboards, guitar), Oscar Cash (keyboards, backing vocals, guitar, saxophone), Anna Prior (drums, backing vocals), Olugbenga Adelekan (bass, backing vocals), and Michael Lovett (keyboards, guitar). Their music consists of vocal and instrumental electronic pop music.

Metronomy have released seven studio albums: Pip Paine (Pay The £5000 You Owe), Nights Out, The English Riviera, Love Letters, Summer 08, Metronomy Forever, and Small World. Mount has also released remixes under the band's name and has remixed songs by artists including Gorillaz, Sebastien Tellier, Roots Manuva, Franz Ferdinand, Klaxons, Goldfrapp, Young Knives, Zero 7, Ladytron, Kate Nash, Lady Gaga, and Lykke Li.

== History ==
"Heartbreaker"
"Heartbreaker" was released as a single in 2008

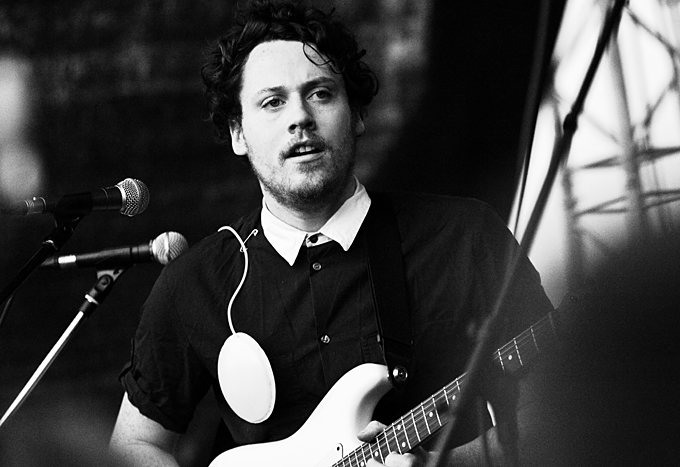
Metronomy founder and frontman, Joseph Mount

As a teenager, Joseph Mount began Metronomy as a bedroom project while he was still living with his parents in Devon. After having an interest in music from an early age, he "drummed in a few bands at school and they all fell apart. Then I got an old computer off my dad and I started messing around when I was about sixteen or seventeen". The name Metronomy was originally chosen by Mount and was said to be influenced by the band names of Autechre and Funkstörung.

In 2002, Mount moved to Brighton for his studies, while having a number of odd jobs, including one at a local HMV. Upon graduating, he became interested in music production and began "soundtracking animations". During his time in Brighton, Mount began to get involved with electronic music nights and performed as a DJ. At one of these gigs he was approached by "some guy, [who] told me he'd put out a record. It turned out that of the songs I'd recorded, I had an album's worth".

In February 2005, Metronomy released the debut album Pip Paine (Pay the £5000 You Owe) backed by the single "You Could Easily Have Me". After it had received limited attention, Mount began to build up a reputation for live shows. Initially, Metronomy was essentially a laptop/DJ act, although Mount soon asked his cousin Oscar Cash and an old schoolfriend Gabriel Stebbing to join him. Mount explained that "I was doing some shows on my own (...), which was pretty crap, so I thought it would be better to get a band thing going on".

The trio spent the next three years gaining live-experience while Mount recreated mixes for many other artists; contractual issues with the record company halted any new release. On remixing, Mount has said "(b)asically, I only like remixers that really care about what they're doing. I can honestly say that I have got really involved in all of my remixes. If I've not got anywhere with one I will tell whoever it is that I'm giving up. That doesn't happen that often." Metronomy has "a good strike rate" in terms of remix work released. However, a DFA-inspired remix of U2's "City of Blinding Lights" was dismissed by their marketing manager and was not released.

Although the band was now a three-piece live, in the studio Mount was "still writing and recording it all on my own" and "influenced by people who’ve written, recorded and produced things all on their own, like Prince". In 2008, the band released the singles "My Heart Rate Rapid", "Holiday", "Heartbreaker" (which feat. a Remix by Kris Menace), "A Thing For Me" and "Radio Ladio" and the full album Nights Out in September of that year. Kris Menace's Remix of "Heartbreaker" became Hype Chart Nr.1 in 2008. In May 2009, it was announced through the band's Myspace page that Stebbing would be leaving the band. Joseph wrote "It's all very amicable and he's assured me he doesn't think he's fleeing a sinking ship." Stebbing is currently working with his own band, Your Twenties, which is being produced by Mount. Despite this, Stebbing reappeared to play bass for Metronomy for their appearance at the Far Out stage at Green Man 2010.

In 2011, the band released three singles "The Look", "Everything Goes My Way", and "The Bay" from their 3rd album The English Riviera which came out on 11 April. The album was the first to feature bassist Olugbenga Adelekan and drummer Anna Prior as band members, rounding out the band as a quartet.

On 23 January 2014, Metronomy's upcoming single Love Letters was named Zane Lowe's "Hottest Record in the World". In a telephone interview with the band, it was confirmed that the video would be directed by Michel Gondry. Their fourth studio album, Love Letters, was released on 10 March 2014, with the band achieving their joint highest ever position on the UK Albums Chart, at number 7.

In an interview with Crack Magazine, it was revealed that Metronomy would be releasing a new album in the summer of 2016. The title of the album was later revealed to be Summer 08, with its release scheduled on 1 July 2016. On 13 September 2019, Metronomy released their sixth studio album, Metronomy Forever. Their seventh studio album, Small World, was released on 18 February 2022.

On 12 March 2024, Metronomy announced that they had signed with Ninja Tune, while simultaneously releasing a new single collaboration with Pan Amsterdam called “Nice Town”.

== Live performances ==
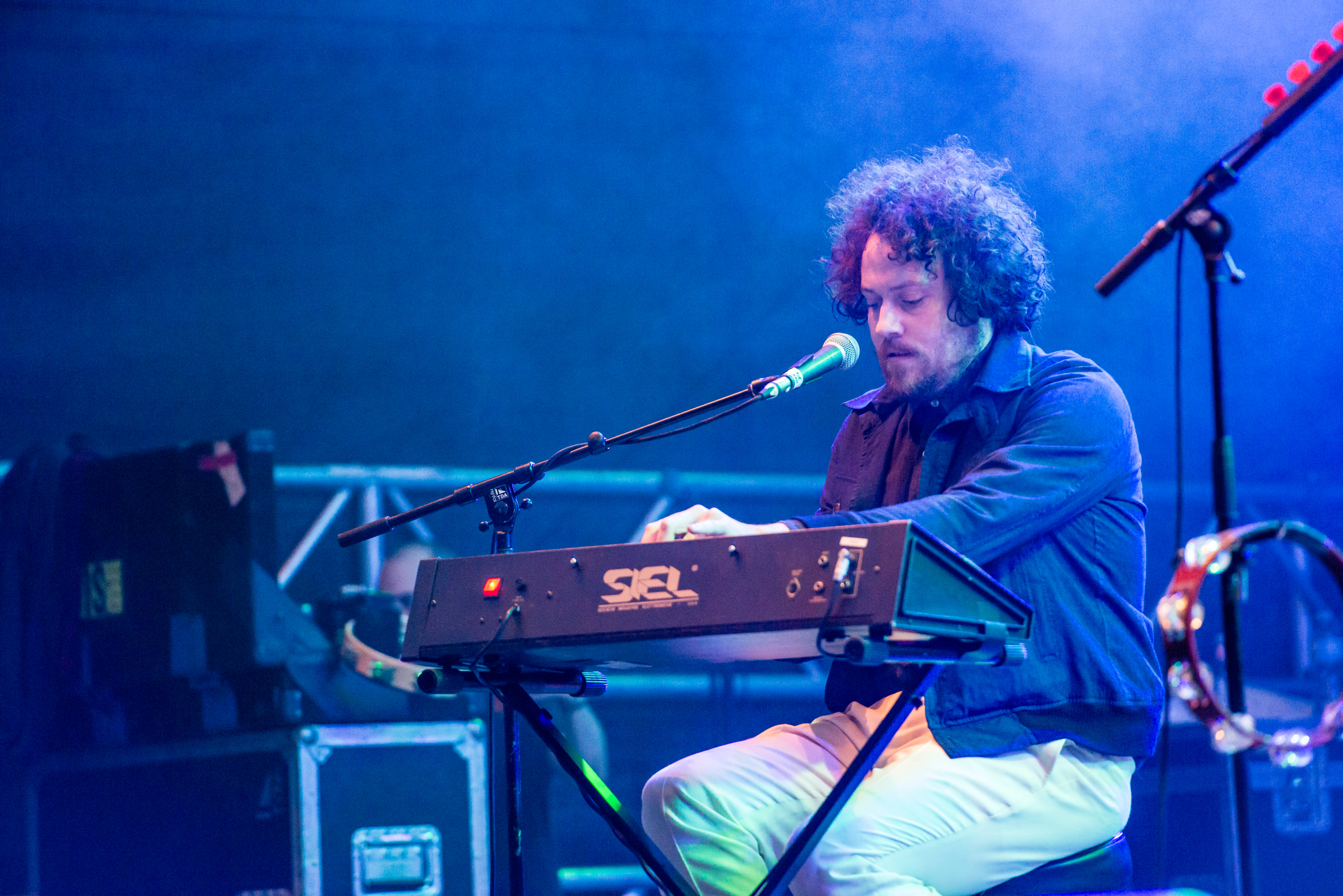
Metronomy live at the Open Source Festival 2015, Düsseldorf

Metronomy have toured widely throughout the UK and mainland Europe supporting acts such as Coldplay, Bloc Party, CSS, Klaxons, Kate Nash and Justice. They engaged in their first headline UK tour in 2008. Metronomy have also played gigs in America and Canada notably at the 2007 SXSW.

Metronomy's live shows include dance routines and light shows. Most notably they use push lights stuck to their chests. Mount explained: "We did our first gig in Brighton, and a few days before I saw these lights in a pound shop and I thought 'we'll whack these on our t-shirts and do some synchronised light shows!' I'm totally aware that some people hate it but equally I think some people enjoy it just for the fact that it's a bit of fun."

Metronomy performed at Field Day music festival in Sydney on New Year's Day 2012 and toured the UK in February 2012 with Two Door Cinema Club, Tribes and Azealia Banks on the NME Awards Tour 2012. They also performed at Primavera Sound Festival in Barcelona in May 2014, at Rock Werchter in Belgium in June 2014 and at Festival No.6 at Portmeirion, Wales in September 2015.

In June 2022, Metronomy appeared at Glastonbury Festival.

== Band members ==
Current members

- Joseph Mount - lead vocals, keyboards, piano, organ, guitars (1999–present)
- Oscar Cash - keyboards, guitars, saxophone, backing vocals (2005–present)
- Olugbenga Adelekan - bass guitar, backing vocals (2011–present)
- Anna Prior - drums, percussion, backing vocals (2011–present)
- Michael Lovett - keyboards, guitars (2018–present)

Former members

- Gabriel Stebbing - bass guitar (2005–2009)

== Discography ==
- Pip Paine (Pay the £5000 You Owe) (2005)
- Nights Out (2008)
- The English Riviera (2011)
- Love Letters (2014)
- Summer 08 (2016)
- Metronomy Forever (2019)
- Small World (2022)

== Awards and nominations ==
Antville Music Video Awards

Year	Nominee / work	Award	Result
2009	"A Thing for Me"	Most Fun	Won
2011	"The Bay"	Best Editing	Won
2011	"She Wants"	Best Choreography	Nominated
2011	Themselves	Best Commissioning Artist	Won
2014	Themselves	Best Commissioning Artist	Won

D&AD Awards

Year	Nominee / work	Award	Result
2012	"The Bay"	Music Video	Wood Pencil

Mercury Prize

Year	Nominee / work	Award	Result
2011	The English Riviera	Album of the Year	Nominated

NME Awards

Year	Nominee / work	Award	Result
2012	"The Bay"	Best Dancefloor Filler	Nominated
2015	"Love Letters"	Best Dancefloor Filler	Nominated

Rober Awards Music Poll

Year	Nominee / work	Award	Result
2011	Themselves	Best Pop Artist	Won

UK Festival Awards

Year	Nominee / work	Award	Result	Ref.
2008	Themselves	Best Dance Act	Nominated	

UK Music Video Awards

Year	Nominee / work	Award	Result
2009	"A Thing for Me"	Best Dance Video	Nominated
2011	"The Bay"	Best Indie/Rock Video (UK)	Nominated
2011	"The Bay"	Best Editing	Nominated
2011	"The Bay"	Best Telecine	Nominated
2014	Themselves	Best Video Artist	Nominated
2014	"I'm Aquarius"	Best Art Direction	Nominated
2014	"Love Letters"	Best Art Direction	Nominated
2014	"Love Letters"	Best Pop Video (UK)	Nominated
2014	"Reservoir"	Best Animation	Nominated
2014	"Reservoir"	Best Alternative Video (UK)	Nominated
2016	"Old Skool"	Best Alternative Video (UK)	Nominated
2016	"Old Skool"	Best Styling	Nominated
2017	"Hang Me Out to Dry" (ft. Robyn)	Best Alternative Video (UK)	Nominated
