= Because Music =

French record label

Because Music SAS
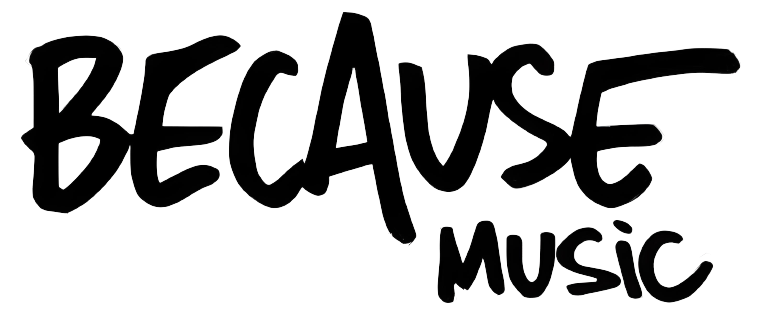
- Parent company: Because Group
- Founded: 2004; 22 years ago
- Founder: Emmanuel de Buretel
- Distributor: Universal Music Group
- Genre: Various
- Country of origin: France
- Location: Paris
- Official website: because.tv

Because Music is a record label based in France. The label was founded in 2004 by Emmanuel de Buretel and Eric Bielsa upon their exit from major labels. Because Music has acts such as Justice, Christine and the Queens, Oklou and Shygirl on their roster.

== History ==
=== Because Music France ===
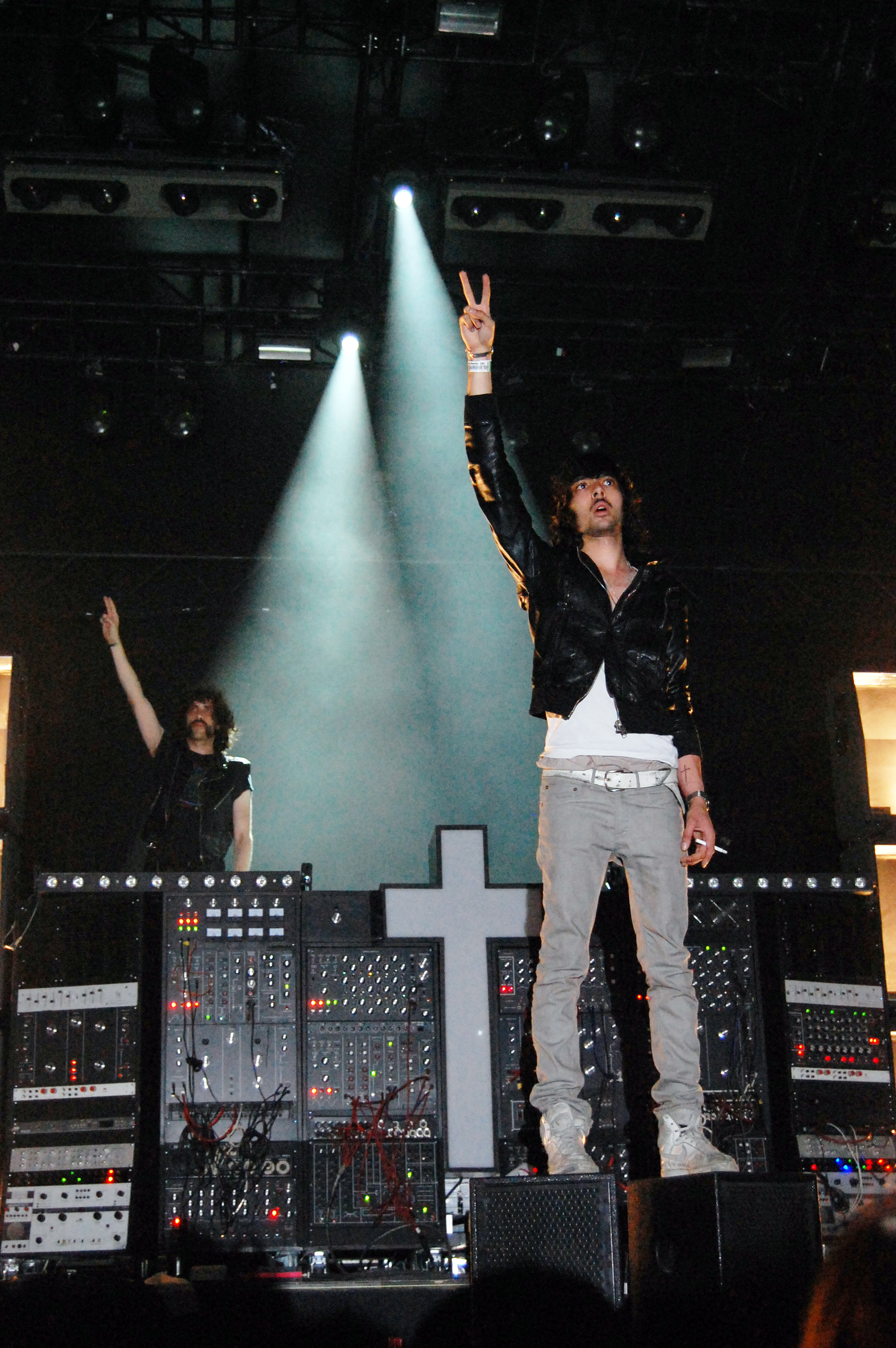
Justice, the duo signed to Because Music

Because Music was founded in late 2004, by Emmanuel de Buretel and Eric Bielsa. Early successes for the label included Justice, Mercury Music Prize nominated Metronomy, Charlotte Gainsbourg and Amadou & Mariam.

The label co-founded the We Love Green pop festival in 2009.

=== Because Music UK ===
Because Music UK was founded in 2005.

In 2017, Because acquired the catalogues of over 60 artists from Warner Music Group, including Mano Negra, The Beta Band, and most of London Records.

Because Music UK has artists such as Bananarama and Goldie.

=== Because Music US ===
In 2017, Because signed a deal with Caroline Distribution (now Virgin Music) (a Universal Music division) for distribution of Because's releases starting in 2019. Before, the distribution was held by Warner Music's Alternative Distribution Alliance and Vice Records.

== Awards ==
Because music won best independent label at The A&R Awards in 2016. In 2017 Because Music was named Best Independent Label at the AIM Independent Music Awards.

== Notable artists ==
- Amadou et Mariam
- The Beta Band
- Brandt Brauer Frick
- Breakbot
- Busy P
- Calypso Rose
- Cassius
- Catherine Ringer
- Cerrone
- Charlotte Gainsbourg
- Christine and the Queens
- Connan Mockasin
- Denai Moore
- Diplo
- DJ Mehdi
- DJ Pone
- Django Django
- Electric Guest
- Fredo Viola
- J. J. Cale
- Jeshi
- Joalin Loukamaa
- Justice
- Kap Bambino
- Keziah Jones
- Les Plastiscines
- Logic1000
- London Grammar
- Les Rita Mitsouko
- Lido
- London Music Stream's catalogue
- Major Lazer
- Manu Chao
- Metronomy
- Mind Enterprises
- Moby
- Mr. Flash
- Mr. Oizo
- Myd
- Nortec Collective
- Para One
- Parcels
- Ratatat
- Riton
- SebastiAn
- Selah Sue
- Seun Kuti
- Shygirl
- Soko
- Spill Tab
- Snow Strippers
- Syd Matters
- The Blood Arm
- Uffie
- Yelle
- Zhu
