= Rahim Redcar discography =

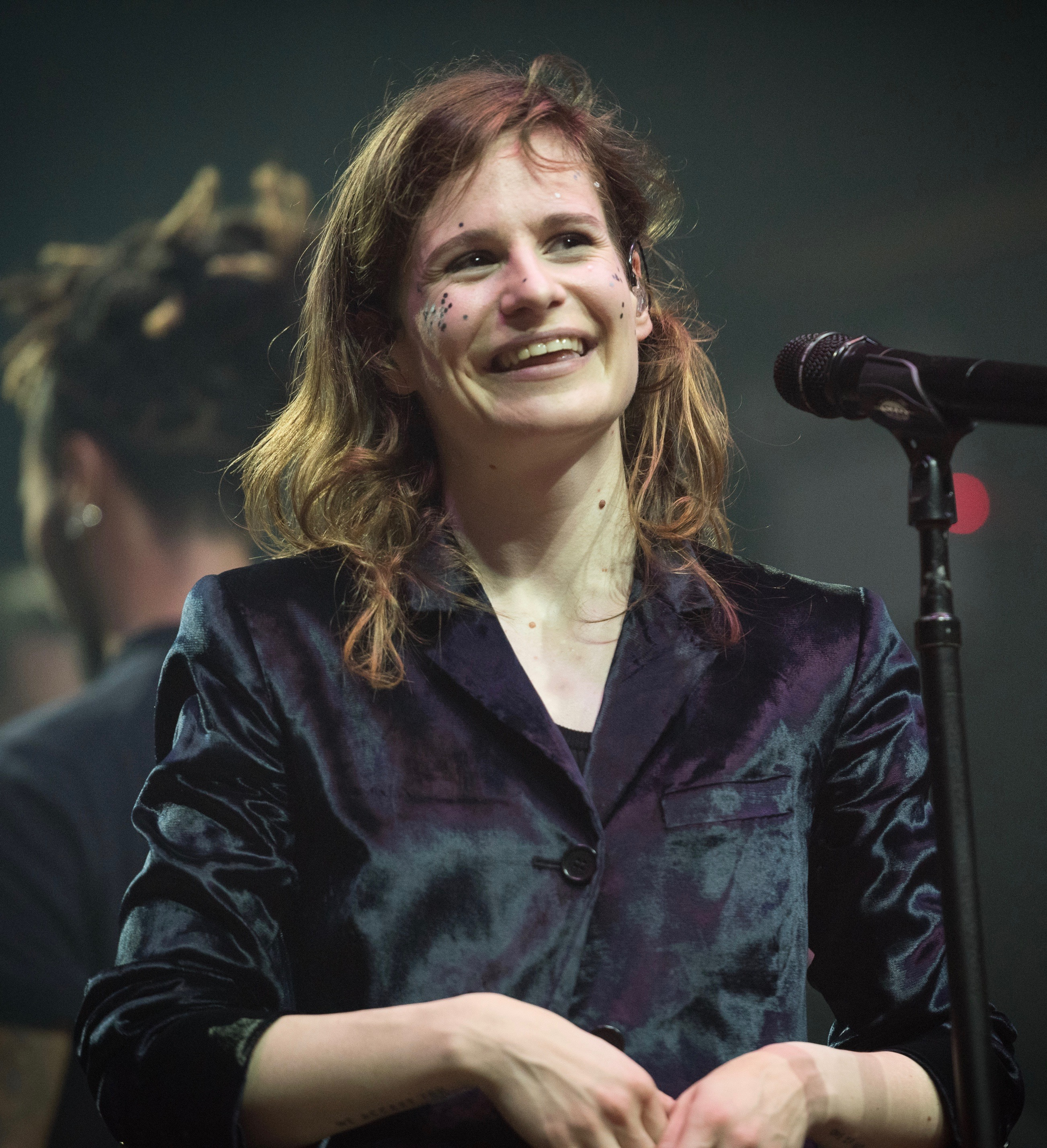
- Christine and the Queens performing at Webster Hall in 2015
- Studio albums: 4
- EPs: 11
- Singles: 19
- Music videos: 15
- Promotional singles: 5

The discography of French singer, songwriter, and producer Rahim Redcar, formerly known as Christine and the Queens, consists of four studio albums, 11 extended plays, 19 singles, five promotional singles, and fifteen music videos.

== Studio albums ==
Title	Details	Peak chart positions										Certifications	Sales
Title	Details	FRA	AUS	BEL (WA)	IRL	NL	NZ	SCO	SWI	UK	US Heat.	Certifications	Sales
Chaleur humaine (Note: The album is self-titled as Christine and the Queens in the United States and various other English-speaking territories.)	Released: 2 June 2014; Label: Because Music; Formats: CD, digital download	2	8	1	1	25	8	2	7	2	7	SNEP: Diamond; BPI: Gold; IFPI SWI: Platinum	FRA: 850,000; UK: 220,000; WW: 1,300,000
Chris	Released: 21 September 2018; Label: Because Music; Formats: CD, digital download	2	— (Note: Chris did not enter the ARIA Albums Chart, but peaked at number 17 on the ARIA Digital Album Chart.)	1	12	32	—	2	5	3	1	SNEP: Platinum; Export: Platinum; BPI: Silver	FRA: 100,000; Export: 178,554
Redcar les adorables étoiles (prologue)	Released: 11 November 2022; Label: Because Music; Formats: LP, CD, digital download, streaming	36	— (Note: Redcar les adorables étoiles (prologue) did not enter the ARIA Albums Chart, but peaked at number 23 on the ARIA Digital Album Chart.)	22	—	—	—	15	36	45	—		
Paranoia, Angels, True Love	Released: 9 June 2023; Label: Because Music; Formats: LP, CD, digital download, streaming	19	—	9	—	—	—	7	25	7	24		
Hopecore	Released: 27 July 2024; Label: self-released; Formats: free digital download	—	—	—	—	—	—	—	—	—	—		

== Extended plays ==
Title	Details	Peak chart positions						Sales
Title	Details	FRA	BEL (WA)	SCO	UK	UK Indie	US World	Sales
Miséricorde	Released: 11 March 2011; Label: Self-released; Formats: CD	—	—	—	—	—	—	
Mac Abbey	Released: 16 January 2012; Label: Remark Music; Formats: CD	—	—	—	—	—	—	
Nuit 17 à 52	Released: 3 June 2013; Label: Because Music; Formats: CD, digital download	130	—	—	—	—	—	
iTunes Session	Released: 9 February 2015; Label: Because Music; Formats: Digital download	39	—	—	—	—	—	
Saint Claude	Released: 14 April 2015; Label: Because Music; Formats: CD, digital download	—	—	—	—	—	—	
Intranquillité	Released: 8 June 2015; Label: Because Music; Formats: CD, digital download	—	—	—	—	—	—	
Live from Spotify London	Released: 19 August 2016; Label: Because Music; Formats: streaming	—	—	—	—	—	—	
Spotify Singles	Released: 5 December 2018; Label: Because Music; Formats: streaming	—	—	—	—	—	—	
La vita nuova	Released: 27 February 2020; Label: Because Music; Formats: Digital download, CD, vinyl	27	28	5	37	2	15	FRA: 1,900+
La vita nuova: séquences 2 et 3	Released: 29 August 2020; Label: Because Music; Formats: 7-inch vinyl	—	—	—	—	—	—	
Joseph	Released: 25 September 2021; Label: Because Music; Formats: Digital download, streaming	—	—	—	—	—	—	
Catching Feelings (featuring Cerrone)	Released: 4 July 2025; Label: Because Music, Malligator Préférence; Formats: Digital download, streaming	—	—	—	—	—	—	
"—" denotes releases that did not chart or were not released in that territory.

== Singles ==
=== As lead artist ===
List of singles, with selected chart positions and certifications
Title	Year	Peak chart positions										Certifications	Album
Title	Year	FRA	AUS	BEL (FL)	BEL (WA)	IRL	NL	NZ	SCO	SWI	UK	Certifications	Album
"Nuit 17 à 52"	2013	75	—	— (Note: "Nuit 17 à 52" did not enter the Ultratop 50, but peaked at number 11 on the Flemish Ultratip chart.)	—	—	—	—	—	—	—		Chaleur humaine / Christine and the Queens
"Saint Claude"	2014	4	—	— (Note: "Saint Claude" did not enter the Ultratop 50, but peaked at number six on the Flemish Ultratip chart.)	8	—	—	—	—	60	—		Chaleur humaine / Christine and the Queens
"Christine"/ "Tilted"	2014	3	—	1	1	—	41	—	—	32	—	BEA: 2× Platinum; BPI: Platinum; IFPI SWI: Gold; NVPI: Gold	Chaleur humaine / Christine and the Queens
"Christine"/ "Tilted"	2014	—	54	—	—	13	—	— (Note: "Titled" did not enter the NZ Top 40 Singles Chart, but peaked at number 1 on the NZ Heatseekers Singles Chart.)	18	—	20	BEA: 2× Platinum; BPI: Platinum; IFPI SWI: Gold; NVPI: Gold	Chaleur humaine / Christine and the Queens
"Paradis perdus"	2015	19	—	— (Note: "Paradis perdus" did not enter the Ultratop 50, but peaked at number 29 on the Flemish Ultratip chart.)	39	—	—	—	—	—	—		Chaleur humaine / Christine and the Queens
"No Harm Is Done" (featuring Tunji Ige)	2015	118	—	—	—	—	—	—	—	—	—		Chaleur humaine / Christine and the Queens
"Jonathan" (featuring Perfume Genius)	2015	120	—	—	— (Note: "Jonathan" did not enter the Ultratop 50, but peaked at number 26 on the Wallonie Ultratip chart.)	—	—	—	—	—	—		Chaleur humaine / Christine and the Queens
"Here" (featuring Booba) (Note: The solo version of "Here" appears on Chaleur humaine.)	2016	52	—	—	—	—	—	—	—	—	—		Non-album single
"Damn, dis-moi"/ "Girlfriend" (featuring Dâm-Funk)	2018	61	—	21	7	—	—	—	—	15	—	SNEP: Gold; Export: Gold	Chris
"Damn, dis-moi"/ "Girlfriend" (featuring Dâm-Funk)	2018	— (Note: "Girlfriend" did not enter the French Singles Chart, but did peak at number 26 on the French Downloads chart and number 27 on the French Singles Sales chart.)	—	21	7	—	—	—	31	—	85	SNEP: Gold; Export: Gold	Chris
"Doesn't Matter (Voleur de Soleil)"	2018	— (Note: "Doesn't Matter (Voleur de Soleil)" did not enter the French Singles Chart, but did peak at number 49 on the French Downloadschart.)	—	—	—	—	—	—	—	—	—		Chris
"5 Dollars"	2018	— (Note: "Doesn't Matter (Voleur de Soleil)" did not enter the French Singles Chart, but did peak at number 83 on the French Downloads chart.)	—	— (Note: "5 Dollars" did not enter the Ultratop 50, but peaked at number 12 on the Flemish Ultratip chart.)	28	—	—	—	38	—	—		Chris
"La Marcheuse / The Walker"	2018	112	—	— (Note: "La Marcheuse" did not enter the Ultratop 50, but peaked at number five on the Flemish Ultratip chart.)	— (Note: "La Marcheuse" did not enter the Ultratop 50, but peaked at number 23 on the Wallonie Ultratip chart.)	—	—	—	—	—	—		Chris
"Comme si"	2019	—	—	— (Note: "Comme si" did not enter the Ultratop 50, but peaked at number 35 on the Flemish Ultratip chart.)	—	—	—	—	—	—	—		Chris
"Gone" (with Charli XCX)	2019	—	—	— (Note: "Gone" did not enter the Ultratop 50, but peaked at number 24 on the Flemish Ultratip chart.)	— (Note: "Gone" did not enter the Ultratop 50, but peaked at number 19 on the Walloon Ultratip chart.)	56	—	—	67	—	58		Charli
"People, I've Been Sad"	2020	—	—	— (Note: "People, I've Been Sad" did not enter the Ultratop 50, but peaked at number 18 on the Flemish Ultratip chart.)	— (Note: "People, I've Been Sad" did not enter the Ultratop 50, but peaked at number 50 on the Walloon Ultratip chart.)	—	—	—	—	—	—		La vita nuova
"I Disappear in Your Arms"	2020	—	—	—	—	—	—	—	—	—	—		La vita nuova
"La vita nuova" (featuring Caroline Polachek)	2020	—	—	—	—	—	—	—	—	—	—		La vita nuova
"3Sex" (with Indochine)	2020	44	—	—	8	—	—	—	—	—	—		Singles Collection 1981–2001
"Body" (with 070 Shake)	2022	—	—	—	—	—	—	—	—	—	—		You Can't Kill Me
"Je te vois enfin"	2022	—	—	—	—	—	—	—	—	—	—		Redcar les adorables étoiles (prologue)
"Rien dire"	2022	—	—	—	—	—	—	—	—	—	—		Redcar les adorables étoiles (prologue)
"La chanson du chevalier"	2022	—	—	—	—	—	—	—	—	—	—		Redcar les adorables étoiles (prologue)
"To Be Honest"	2023	—	—	—	—	—	—	—	—	—	— (Note: "To Be Honest" did not enter the UK Singles Chart but peaked at number 96 on the UK Singles Downloads Chart.)		Paranoïa, Angels, True Love
"True Love" (featuring 070 Shake)	2023	—	—	—	—	—	—	—	—	—	—		Paranoïa, Angels, True Love
"Tears Can Be So Soft"	2023	—	—	—	—	—	—	—	—	—	—		Paranoïa, Angels, True Love
"A Day in the Water"	2023	—	—	—	—	—	—	—	—	—	—		Paranoïa, Angels, True Love
"“Rendez-vous in your arms" / "Rendez-vous avec toi"	2026	—	—	—	—	—	—	—	—	—	—		
"—" denotes releases that did not chart or were not released in that territory.

=== As featured artist ===
Title	Year	Peak chart positions		Album
Title	Year	IRL	NZ Hot	Album
"New Shapes" (Charli XCX featuring Christine and the Queens and Caroline Polachek)	2021	90	39	Crash
"The Only One" (Logic1000 featuring Christine and the Queens)	2026	—	—	Confirmation

=== Promotional singles ===
Title	Year	Album
"The Loving Cup"	2013	Nuit 17 à 52
"Narcissus Is Back"	2015	Chaleur humaine
"Would I Lie to You" with Manu Payet	2019	Non-album promotional singles
"Blinding Lights - Souvenirs d'été" (Deezer Original)	2020	Non-album promotional singles
"Eyes of a Child"	2020	Hanna season 2 soundtrack

== Other charted songs ==
List of other charted songs, with selected chart positions
Title	Year	Peak chart positions	Album
Title	Year	FRA	Album
"Chaleur humaine"	2015	186	Chaleur humaine
"Intranquillité"	2015	54	Chaleur humaine
"Amazoniaque"	2015	178	Chaleur humaine
"Safe and Holy"	2015	188	Chaleur humaine

== Guest appearances ==
Title	Year	Other artist(s)	Album
"Second 2 None"	2017	Mura Masa	Mura Masa
"What Lovers Do"	2018	None	BBC Radio 1's Live Lounge 2018
"People, I've Been Sad"	2020	None	One World: Together at Home
"Mountains"	2020	None	One World: Together at Home
"Dancing in Babylon"	2024	MGMT	Loss of Life

== Music videos ==
Title	Year	Director(s)
"Narcissus Is Back"	2011	Héloïse Letissier, Thomas Aufort
"The Loving Cup"	2013	Ugo Mangin
"Nuit 17 à 52"	2013	
"Saint Claude"	2014	J.A.C.K.
"Christine"	2014	J.A.C.K.
"Tilted"	2014	J.A.C.K.
"No Harm Is Done"	2015	Héloïse Letissier
"Paradis Perdus"	2015	J.A.C.K.
"Jonathan"	2015	Héloïse Letissier
"Here"	2016	Arthur King, Feelings
"Girlfriend / Damn, dis-moi"	2018	Jordan Bahat
"Doesn't Matter / Voleur de soleil"	2018	Colin Solal Cardo
"5 Dollars"	2018	Colin Solal Cardo
"La Marcheuse / The Walker"	2018	Colin Solal Cardo
"Gone" (with Charli XCX)	2019	Colin Solal Cardo
"La Chanson du Chevalier"	2022	Héloïse Letissier, Ludovic Zuili
"To Be Honest"	2023	Héloïse Letissier
