= List of awards and nominations received by Rahim Redcar =

Rahim Redcar awards and nominations
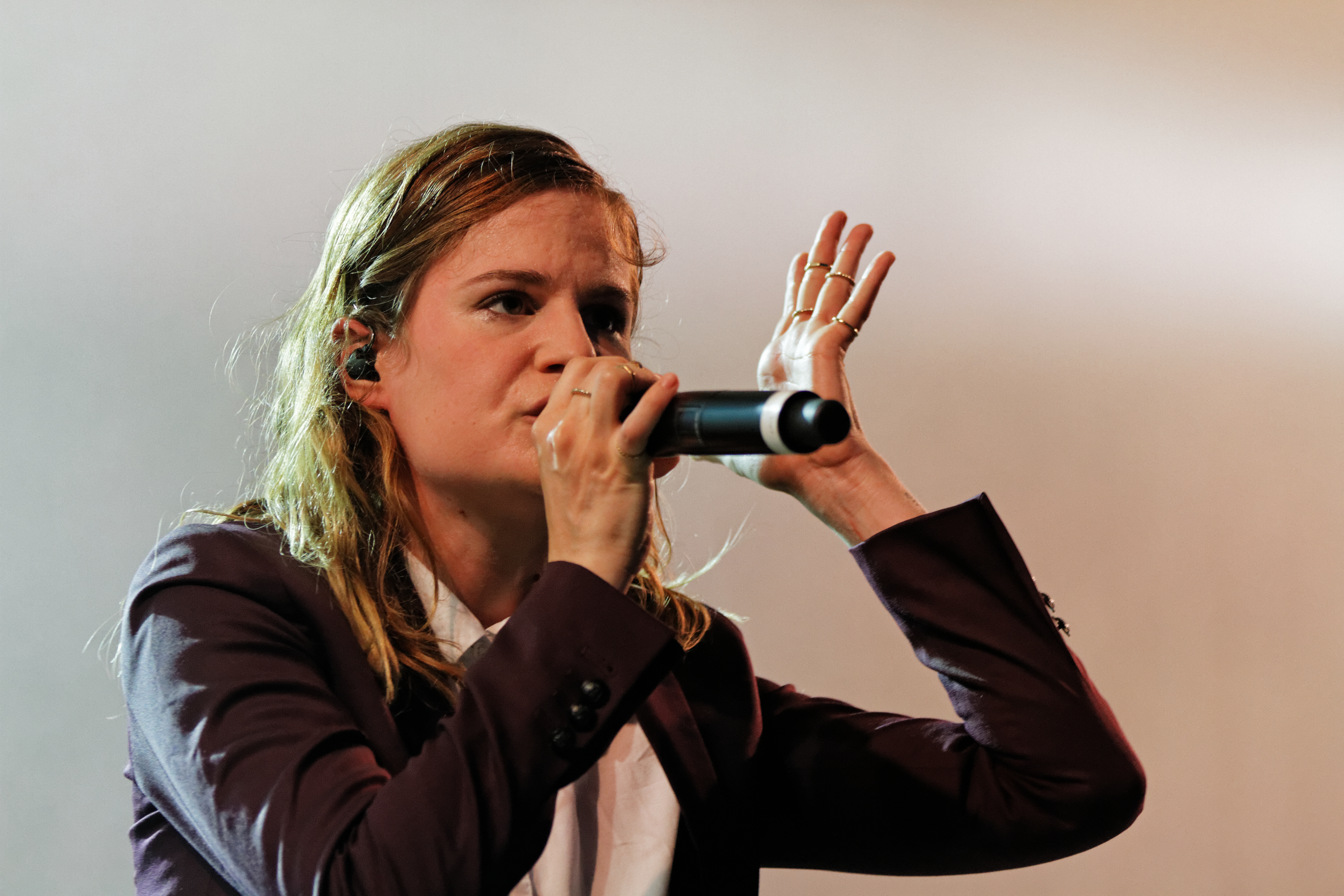
- Redcar at the Vieilles Charrues Festival in 2014
Awards and nominations
Award	Wins	Nominations
BBC Music Awards	0	1
Brit Awards	0	2
European Border Breakers Awards	1	1
Globe de Cristal Awards	0	3
IMPALA Awards	0	2
MTV Europe Music Awards	0	2
NME Awards	2	5
NRJ Music Awards	0	3
Silver Clef Awards	0	1
UK Music Video Awards	0	9
Victoires de la Musique	4	10

Totals (Note: Certain award groups do not simply award one winner. They acknowledge several different recipients, have runners-up, and have third place. Since this is a specific recognition and is different from losing an award, runner-up mentions are considered wins in this award tally. For simplification and to avoid errors, each award in this list has been presumed to have had a prior nomination.)
- Wins: 11
- Nominations: 65

This is a list of awards and nominations received by French singer-songwriter Rahim Redcar, sorted by awarding body.

== A2IM Libera Awards ==
The American Association of Independent Music hosts the Libera Awards to award achievements in independent music.

Year	Nominee / work	Award	Result	Ref.
2021	"La vita nuova"	Video of the Year	Nominated	

== AIM Independent Music Awards ==
The AIM Independent Music Awards, hosted by the Association of Independent Music (AIM), were established in 2011 to recognize artists signed to independent record labels in the United Kingdom.

Year	Nominee / work	Award	Result	Ref.
2016	Independent Breakthrough of the Year	Himself	Won	
2016	Independent Track of the Year	"Tilted"	Nominated	
2018	Independent Track of the Year	"Girlfriend"	Nominated	
2019	Independent Album of the Year	Chris	Nominated	
2019	Independent Video of the Year	"5 Dollars"	Nominated	

== Attitude Magazine Awards ==
The Attitude Magazine Awards are dedicated to honouring those who inspire and make change, influence and entertain, making LGBT+ lives easier. Attitude Awards winners are those who use their platform to show how talented and diverse the LGBT+ community is, whether they identify as LGBT+ or not, and take the time to fight in our corner.

Year	Nominee / work	Award	Result	Ref.
2019	Himself	The Artist Award	Won	

== BBC Music Awards ==
The BBC Music Awards are the BBC's annual pop music awards, held every December, as a celebration of the musical achievements over the past twelve months. The event is coordinated by the BBC's music division, BBC Music.

Year	Nominee / work	Award	Result	Ref.
2016	"Sorry"	Radio 1 Live Lounge Performance of the Year	Nominated	

== Best Art Vinyl ==
The Best Art Vinyl is an annual award that began in 2005. It celebrates artists and designers of vinyl record cover art. The favourites are voted for by the public from a selection of nominations by judges within the world of art and music.

Year	Nominee / work	Award	Result	Ref.
2018	Chris	Best Art Vinyl	Nominated	

== Brit Awards ==
The Brit Awards (often simply called The BRITs) are the British Phonographic Industry's annual popular music awards.

Year	Nominee / work	Award	Result	Ref.
2017	Himself	International Female Solo Artist	Nominated	
2019	Himself	International Female Solo Artist	Nominated	

== British LGBT Awards ==
The British LGBT Awards are a British award show that aim to recognize individuals and organizations that display "outstanding" commitment to the LGBT community.

Year	Nominee / work	Award	Result	Ref.
2020	Himself	Music Artist	Nominated	

== European Border Breakers Awards ==
The European Border Breakers Awards (EBBA) were established in 2004 by the European Commission and several companies and organizations within the European music business. Awards are presented to musicians and bands with the best selling debut albums in the European Union, not counting their home country.

Year	Nominee / work	Award	Result	Ref.
2016	Chaleur humaine	Album of the Year (France)	Won	

== Elle Style Awards ==
The Elle Style Awards are an awards ceremony hosted annually by Elle magazine.

Year	Nominee / work	Award	Result	Ref.
2017	Chaleur humaine	Album of the Year	Won	

== GAFFA Awards ==
=== GAFFA Awards (Denmark) ===
The GAFFA Awards (Danish: GAFFA Prisen) have been awarded in the field of popular music since 1991 by Danish magazine GAFFA.

Year	Nominee / work	Award	Result
2019	Himself	Best International Breakthrough	Nominated
2019	Himself	Best International Band	Nominated
2019	Chris	Best International Album	Nominated
2019	"Girlfriend"	Best International Hit	Nominated
2021	"People, I've Been Sad"	Best International Hit	Nominated
2021	Himself	Best International Solo Act	Nominated
2021	La Vita Nuova	Best International Album	Nominated

=== GAFFA Awards (Sweden) ===
The GAFFA Awards (Swedish: GAFFA Priset) have been awarded in the field of popular music since 2010 by GAFFA Sweden.

Year	Nominee / work	Award	Result
2019	Himself	Best International Breakthrough	Nominated

== GLAAD Media Awards ==
The GLAAD Media Awards were created in 1990 by the Gay & Lesbian Alliance Against Defamation to "recognize and honor media for their fair, accurate and inclusive representations of the LGBT community and the issues that affect their lives.

Year	Nominee / work	Award	Result	Ref.
2019	Chris	Outstanding Music Artist	Nominated	

== Globe de Cristal Awards ==
The Globe de Cristal Awards is a set of awards bestowed by members of the French PA Media news agency recognizing excellence in home art and culture.

Year	Nominee / work	Award	Result	Ref.
2015	Chaleur humaine	Best Female Performer	Nominated	
2017	Chaleur humaine	Best Female Performer	Nominated	
2019	Chris	Best Female Performer	Nominated	

== IMPALA Awards ==
The Independent Music Companies Association (IMPALA) is a non-profit trade body established in April 2000 to help European independent music companies represent their own agenda and promote independent music in the interests of artistic, entrepreneurial and cultural diversity.

Year	Nominee / work	Award	Result	Ref.
2017	Chaleur humaine	Album of the Year	Nominated	
2019	Chris	Album of the Year	Nominated	

== MTV Europe Music Awards ==
Established in 1994, the MTV Europe Music Awards (MTV EMA) are awards presented by ViacomCBS to honour artists and music in pop culture in Europe.

Year	Nominee / work	Award	Result	Ref.
2014	Himself	Best French Act	Nominated	
2015	Himself	Best French Act	Nominated	

== Music Week Awards ==
Founded by British music magazine Music Week, the Music Week Awards are presented annually.

Year	Nominee / work	Award	Result	Ref.
2019	Himself	Artist Marketing Campaign	Nominated	

== NME Awards ==
The NME Awards are presented on an annual music awards show in the United Kingdom founded by the music magazine NME (New Musical Express).

Year	Nominee / work	Award	Result	Ref.
2017	"Tilted"	Best Track	Won	
2017	Himself	Best International Female Artist	Won	
2017	Himself	Best New Artist	Nominated	
2017	Himself	Best Live Band	Nominated	
2020	"Gone" (with Charli XCX)	Best Collaboration	Nominated	

== NRJ Music Awards ==
NRJ Music Awards (commonly abbreviated as an NMA) are presented by the French radio station NRJ in partnership with the television network TF1 since 2000 to honor the best in the French and worldwide music industry.

Year	Nominee / work	Award	Result	Ref.
2015	"Tilted"	Francophone Song of the Year	Nominated	
2015	Himself	Francophone Female Artist of the Year	Nominated	
2018	Himself	Francophone Female Artist of the Year	Nominated	

== Q Awards ==
The Q Awards, last awarded in 2019, were an annual music awards programme run by the British music magazine Q, which began in 1990.

Year	Nominee / work	Award	Result	Ref.
2016	Chaleur humaine	Best Album	Nominated	
2016	Himself	Best Breakthrough Act	Nominated	
2018	Himself	Best Solo Artist	Nominated	
2018	"Girlfriend"	Best Track	Nominated	
2019	Himself	Best Act in the World Today	Nominated	
2019	Himself	Q Icon	Won	

== Queerty Awards ==
The Queerty Awards are bestowed annually in a readers-voted awards ceremony by the online magazine Queerty.

Year	Nominee / work	Award	Result	Ref.
2020	"Gone" (with Charli XCX)	Anthem	Nominated	

== Rober Awards Music poll ==
The Rober Awards Music Poll is a not-for profit venture with the interest of sharing passion about music and films.

Year	Nominee / work	Award	Result	Ref.
2015	Saint Claude	Best EP	Nominated	
2018	Himself	Best Group or Duo	Nominated	
2018	Himself	Best Pop Artist	Nominated	
2019	"Gone" (with Charli XCX)	Floorfiller of the Year	Nominated	
2020	"La vita nuova"	Best Music Video	Nominated	

== Silver Clef Awards ==
The O2 Silver Clef Awards is an annual UK music awards lunch which has been running since 1976.

Year	Nominee / work	Award	Result	Ref.
2016	Himself	Best Live Act	Nominated	

== UK Music Video Awards ==
The UK Music Video Awards is an annual award ceremony founded in 2008 to recognise creativity, technical excellence and innovation in music videos and moving images for music.

Year	Nominee / work	Award	Result	Ref.
2016	Himself	Best Video Artist	Nominated	
2016	"Tilted"	Best Choreography in a Video	Nominated	
2016	"Tilted"	Best Pop Video – International	Nominated	
2018	"Girlfriend"	Best Pop Video – International	Nominated	
2018	"Girlfriend"	Best Choreography in a Video	Nominated	
2018	"Doesn't Matter"	Best Choreography in a Video	Nominated	
2018	Himself	Best Artist	Nominated	
2020	"La vita nuova"	Best Choreography in a Video	Nominated	
2020	La vita nuova	Best Special Video Project	Nominated	
2026	"The Only One"	Best Dance/Electronic Video – Newcomer	Pending	

== Victoires de la Musique ==
The Victoires de la Musique is an annual French award ceremony where the Victoire accolade is delivered by the French Ministry of Culture to recognize outstanding achievement in the music industry.

Year	Nominee / work	Award	Result	Ref.
2014	Himself	Group or Artist Popular Révélation of the Year	Nominated	
2015	Himself	Female Artist of the Year	Won	
2015	"Saint Claude"	Music Video of the Year	Won	
2015	"Saint Claude"	Original Song of the Year	Nominated	
2015	Chaleur humaine	Album of the Year	Nominated	
2015	At La Gaîté lyrique, La Cigale and on tour	Musical Show, Tour or Concert of the Year	Nominated	
2016	Tour of the Le Zénith	Musical Show, Tour or Concert of the Year	Won	
2016	"Tilted"	Music Video of the Year	Won	
2019	Himself	Female Artist of the Year	Nominated	
2019	Chris	Album of the Year	Nominated	
2021	"La vita nuova"	Video of the Year	Nominated	
