= 2018 UK Music Video Awards =

- Date: 25 October 2018
- Location: Roundhouse, London, United Kingdom
- Website: www.ukmva.com

The 2018 UK Music Video Awards were held on 25 October 2018 to recognise the best in music videos from United Kingdom and worldwide. The nominations were announced on 27 September 2018.

== Video of the Year ==
Video of the Year

Childish Gambino - "This Is America"
(Director: Hiro Murai)

== Video genre categories ==
Best Pop Video - UK	Best Pop Video - International
Dua Lipa - "IDGAF" (Director: Henry Scholfield): George Ezra - "Shotgun"; Nao - "Another Lifetime"; Sam Smith ft. Logic - "Pray"; Stormzy ft. MNEK - "Blinded by Your Grace"; Years & Years - "Sanctify (Part 1)"	Rosalía - "Malamente" (Director: CANADA): Ariana Grande - "God Is a Woman"; Christine and the Queens ft. Dâm-Funk - "Girlfriend"; Leon Bridges - "Bad Bad News"; Rosalía - "Pienso en tu Mirá"; Sean Paul & Major Lazer - "Tip Pon It"
Best Rock Video - UK	Best Rock Video - International
Florence + The Machine - "Big God" (Director: Autumn de Wilde): Arctic Monkeys - "Four Out of Five"; Florence + The Machine - "Hunger"; Royal Blood - "How Did We Get So Dark?"; Snow Patrol - "Life on Earth"; The Horrors - "Something to Remember Me By"	Jack White - "Corporation" (Director: Jodeb): Father John Misty - "Mr. Tillman"; Jack White - "Over and Over and Over"; Lenny Kravitz - "Low"; Phantogram - "Funeral Pyre"; Rainbow Kitten Surprise - "Hide"
Best Alternative Video - UK	Best Alternative - International
alt-J - "Pleader" (Director: Isaiah Seret): Gaz Coombes - "Walk the Walk"; Leon Vynehall - "Movements (Chapter 111)"; King Krule - "Biscuit Town"; Novo Amor - "Birthplace"; Young Fathers - "Holy Ghost"	Sevdaliza - "Shahmaran" (Director: Emmanuel Adjei): Björk - "Utopia"; LCD Soundsystem - "Oh Baby"; Moses Sumney - "Quarrel"; Rone ft. Noga Erez - "Wave"; Sevdaliza - "Hear My Pain Heal"
Best Dance Video - UK	Best Dance Video - International
Jon Hopkins - "Singularity" (Director: Seb Edwards): Aphex Twin - "Collapse"; Calvin Harris and Dua Lipa - "One Kiss"; Damian Lazarus & The Ancient Moons - "Heart of Sky"; Gorillaz ft. Little Simz - "Garage Palace"; Jon Hopkins - "Emerald Rush"	The Blaze - "Queens" (Director: The Blaze): Carnage & Steve Aoki ft. Lockdown - "Plur Genocide"; Chaka Khan - "Like Sugar"; DJ Snake - "Magenta Riddim"; Tshegue - "Muanapoto"; Tune-Yards - "Heart Attack"
Best Urban Video - UK	Best Urban Video - International
Jorja Smith - "Blue Lights" (Director: Olivia Rose): Bipolar Sunshine - "Easy to Do"; Col3trane - "Fear & Loathing/Britney"; Dizzee Rascal - "Bop N Keep It Dippin"; Stormzy - "Gang Signs & Prayer"; Tom Misch ft. Loyle Carner - "Water Baby"	Childish Gambino - "This Is America" (Director: Hiro Murai): ASAP Rocky ft. Moby - "Forever"; Kali Uchis ft. Tyler the Creator, Bootsy Collins - "After the Storm"; Kamasi Washington - "Street Fighter Mas"; Kendrick Lamar ft. SZA - "All the Stars"; The Carters - "APESHIT"
Best Pop Video - Newcomer	Best Rock Video - Newcomer
Leyya - "Wannabe" (Director: Rupert Höller): 11 - "Find a Way"; Becky and the Birds - "Becky and the Birds"; Kenzie - "Dark July"; Poppy Ajudha - "She is the Sum"; Zagmachi - "God's Lament"	Idles - "Colossus" (Director: Will Hooper): Bloody Knees - "Maybe It's Easy"; Gengahr - "Before Sunrise"; Lightwave Empire - "Too Close to the Sun"; Pumarosa - "Lion's Den"; Wolf Alice - "Space and Time"
Best Alternative Video - Newcomer	Best Dance Video - Newcomer
BadBadNotGood ft. Samuel T. Herring - "I Don't Know" (Director: Will Mayer): Agar Agar - "Fangs Out"; Hak Baker - "Like It or Lump It"; Liars - "Cred Woes"; Solomon Grey - "Wonderful World"; The Horrors - "Ghost"	Kelly Lee Owens - "Throwing Lines" (Director: Kasper Häggström): Confident Man - "Don't You Know I'm in a Band"; Daniel Avery - "Glass"; Gila - "Shadow Boxing"; Mr. Cole x Kojey Radical - "Soak It Up"; Turtle - "Bloodtype"
Best Urban Video - Newcomer
Flohio - "10 More Rounds" (Director: Duncan Loudon): To - "Monster"; Col3trane ft. Ebenezer - "Language"; Gaika - "Crown and Key"; Kobo - "Baltimore"; Slowthai - "Ladies"

== Craft and technical categories ==
Best Production Design in a Video	Best Styling in a Video
King Krule - "Biscuit Town" (Production Designer: Francesca Di Mottola): Björk - "Arisen My Senses"; Jack White - "Over and Over and Over"; Kali Uchis ft. Tyler the Creator, Bootsy Collins - "After the Storm"; Rosalía - "Malamente"; Sevdaliza - "Shahmaran"	Years & Years - "If You're Over Me" (Stylist (wardrobe): Nick Royal): Chaka Khan - "Like Sugar"; Dizzee Rascal - "Bop N Keep it Dippin"; Florence + the Machine - "Big God"; Neneh Cherry - "Kong"; Rosalía - "Malamente"
Best Choreography in a Video	Best Cinematography in a Video
Florence + the Machine - "Big God" (Choreographers: Akram Khan, Florence Welch): Childish Gambino - "This Is America"; Christine and the Queens - "Doesn't Matter"; Christine and the Queens - "Girlfriend"; Jon Hopkins - "Singularity"; N.E.R.D. & Rihanna - "Lemon"	Childish Gambino - "This Is America" (DOP: Larkin Seiple): Ateph Elidja - "Burn October"; Aufgang - "Backstabbers"; Carnage & Steve Aoki ft. Lockdown - "Plur Genocide"; Indochine - "Station 13"; Sevdaliza - "Shahmaran"
Best Color Grading in a Video	Best Editing in a Video
Chaka Khan - "Like Sugar" (Colourist: Simon Bourne at Framestore): ASAP Rocky ft. Moby - "Forever"; alt-J - "Pleader"; Leon Bridges - "Bet Ain't Worth the Band"; Neneh Cherry - "Kong"; Tagua Tagua - "Rastro de Po"	Chaka Khan - "Like Sugar" (Editor: Fouad Gaber at Trim): alt-J - "Pleader"; Aufgang - "Backstabbers"; Jon Hopkins - "Singularity"; The Blaze - "Queens"; Young Fathers - "Toy"
Best Visual Effects in a Video	Best Animation in a Video
Sevdaliza - "Shahmaran" (VFX: Mathematic): Aphex Twin - "Collapse"; Björk - "Arisen My Senses"; DJ Snake - "Magenta Riddim"; Justice - "Pleasure"; Sean Paul & Major Lazer - "Tip Pon It"	Father John Misty - "Please Don't Die" (Animators: Cadi Catlow & Henry Nicholson): Aphex Twin - "Collapse"; Paula Cavalciuk - "Uterine Death and Life"; Sigrid - "Focus"; U2 - "Love is Bigger Than Anything In Its Way (Beck Remix)"

== Live and interactive categories ==
Best Live Video	Best Live Concert
Justin Timberlake ft. Chris Stapleton - "Say Something" (Director: Arturo Perez jr.): Biffy Clyro - "Many of Horror (MTV Unplugged)"; Daughter - "All I Wanted (Live at Asylum Chapel)"; Jorja Smith - "February 3rd (Vevo Lift)"; Moses Sumney - "Rank & File"; Soulwax - "Is It Always Binary"	Biffy Clyro - MTV Unplugged (Live at Roundhouse, London) (Director: Sam Wrench): Arcade Fire: Live at L'accorhotels Arena; Arctic Monkeys: Live at the BBC; House of Vans presents: Royal Blood Live Streamed from London; MGMT Live at Days Off; Steven Wilson: Home Invasion (in concert at the Royal Albert Hall)
Best Interactive Video
Pup - "Old Wounds" (Director: Jeremy Schaulin-Rioux): Daniel Og - "Roll the Dice"; Foster the People - "Sit Next to Me"; Human Pyramids - "Crackle Pop"; LCD Soundsystem - "Dance Tonite"; Too Many T's - "Featuring Alex"

== Individual and company categories ==
Best Artist	Best Commissioner
Young Fathers: Björk; Christine and the Queens; Florence + the Machine; Janelle Monáe; Sigrid	Andrew Law: Connie Meade; Elizabeth Doonan; James Hackett; John Moule; Semera Khan
Best Production Company	Best Producer
Somesuch: Academy Films; Division; Freenjoy; Iconoclast; Pulse Films	Théo Gall: Amber Millington; Dasha Deriagina; Jason Baum; Natalie Arnett; Natan Schotterfels
Best Director	Best New Director
CANADA: Ag Rojas; Autumn de Wilde; Dexter Navy; Nadia Lee Cohen; The Blaze	Zhang + Knight: Adriaan Louw; Anton Tammi; Duncan London; Klvdr; Paco Raterta
