= Global Citizen Live =

2021 music festival

- Date: 25–26 September 2021
- Type: Charity concert
- Organized by: Global Citizen
- Website: www.globalcitizen.org/en/live/

Global Citizen Live was the 2021 instance of the Global Citizen Festival, so named because it was broadcast live internationally from cities across six continents around the world on 25 and 26 September 2021.

== Background ==
Global Citizen has held an annual music festival since 2012, one of the organization's main events to raise awareness of global poverty and climate change; founded in 2008, it aims to end poverty by 2030. The live 2021 festival, held across six continents, was the largest, as part of Global Citizen's 2021 Recovery Plan for the World program. Added to the festival mission was an aim to help bring an end to the COVID-19 pandemic, with a focus on vaccine equity. It was timed to occur during the G20 summit and UN general assembly meetings. Global Citizen had held "Vax Live: The Concert To Reunite The World" earlier in 2021.

== Festival ==
Concert locations

Compared to Live Aid and one of the biggest international charity events ever, the festival featured live global performances from some of the world's top recording and classical artists across various cultures. More than 60 artists were scheduled to perform. Simon Le Bon, who performed with Duran Duran at both Live Aid and Global Citizen Live, said that the intention of Live Aid had "diminished in people's minds" and become forgotten. The band's bassist John Taylor said that Global Citizen Live was the closest thing to Live Aid in the age of streaming, and would not be possible without Live Aid and Band Aid creating the precedent.

Global Citizen estimated that tens of thousands of people would attend the in-person events, and millions would watch the live broadcasts. Tickets were free, and awarded at random to people who shared Global Citizen campaigns through their app; attendees had to prove either a negative COVID-19 test or vaccination against it. The organization does not aim to raise money with the festival, but encourage people to take action - and pressure leaders to take action - on global issues. However, prior to the festival, Global Citizen reaches out to corporations, organizations and even nations for financial and material pledges towards reaching its aims, which are then announced between performances during the festival.

The Duke and Duchess of Sussex made an appearance at the New York event, calling for global vaccine equity.

== Performances ==
Several performances were pre-recorded. Some locations did not have live events open to the public, but were broadcast live. The live performances were held over the 24 hour period beginning at 1 pm on September 25 in New York. (Note: 4 am on September 26 in Sydney; 3 am on September 26 in Seoul; 10:30 pm on September 25 in Mumbai; 7 pm on September 25 in Johannesburg, Madrid, Paris, and Tuscany; 6 pm on September 25 in Lagos and London; 2 pm on September 25 in Buenos Aires and Rio de Janeiro; 1 pm on September 25 in Louisville and New York City; 10 am on September 25 in Las Vegas and Los Angeles.)

City	Venue	Host(s)	Artist(s)	Songs
Oceania
Sydney, Australia (UTC+1000)	Sydney Opera House		Delta Goodrem	"Keep Climbing" "Born to Try" "The Show Must Go On" "The Power"
Asia
Seoul, South Korea (UTC+0900)	Sungnyemun Gate		BTS	"Permission to Dance" "Butter"
Mumbai, India (UTC+0530)	Gateway of India	Priyanka Chopra, Anil Kapoor, Kiara Advani, Riteish Deshmukh, Ananya Panday, Janhvi Kapoor, Arjun Kapoor, Sara Ali Khan, Dia Mirza	Farhan Akhtar	"Mard"
Mumbai, India (UTC+0530)	Gateway of India	Priyanka Chopra, Anil Kapoor, Kiara Advani, Riteish Deshmukh, Ananya Panday, Janhvi Kapoor, Arjun Kapoor, Sara Ali Khan, Dia Mirza	Ajay–Atul	"Zingaat" "Vishwam Bharatam Swagatam" "Deva Shri Ganesha" "Vande Mataram"
Mumbai, India (UTC+0530)	Gateway of India	Priyanka Chopra, Anil Kapoor, Kiara Advani, Riteish Deshmukh, Ananya Panday, Janhvi Kapoor, Arjun Kapoor, Sara Ali Khan, Dia Mirza	Badshah featuring Aastha Gill	"Paani Paani" "No Mercy" "Genda Phool" "Abhi Toh Party Shuru Hui Hai"
Mumbai, India (UTC+0530)	Gateway of India	Priyanka Chopra, Anil Kapoor, Kiara Advani, Riteish Deshmukh, Ananya Panday, Janhvi Kapoor, Arjun Kapoor, Sara Ali Khan, Dia Mirza	Tanishk Bagchi	Medley (featuring Zara Khan, Yasser Desai and Nikhita Gandhi)
Mumbai, India (UTC+0530)	Gateway of India	Priyanka Chopra, Anil Kapoor, Kiara Advani, Riteish Deshmukh, Ananya Panday, Janhvi Kapoor, Arjun Kapoor, Sara Ali Khan, Dia Mirza	Amit Trivedi	"Songs of Faith" medley (featuring Yashita Sharma and Devender Pal Singh)
Africa
Johannesburg, South Africa (UTC+0200)			Sho Madjozi	
Johannesburg, South Africa (UTC+0200)			Muzi	
Lagos, Nigeria (UTC+0100)	New Afrika Shrine		Davido	"Ke Star" "Blow My Mind" "Jowo" "If" "Fia" "La La" (with CKay) "Fall"
Lagos, Nigeria (UTC+0100)	New Afrika Shrine		Femi Kuti	"Water No Get Enemy" featuring Made Kuti and Seun Kuti
Lagos, Nigeria (UTC+0100)	New Afrika Shrine		Made Kuti	"I Won't Run Away"
Lagos, Nigeria (UTC+0100)	New Afrika Shrine		Seun Kuti	
Lagos, Nigeria (UTC+0100)	New Afrika Shrine		Tiwa Savage	"Attention" "Koroba" "Tales by Moonlight" (with Amaarae) "Somebody's Son"
Lagos, Nigeria (UTC+0100)	New Afrika Shrine		Alhanislam	"Conscience"
Europe
Madrid, Spain (UTC+0200) (Note: Camilo's set was part of performance from his Mis Manos tour, recorded for Global Citizen Live.)	Palacio de Deportes de la Comunidad de Madrid		Camilo	"Vida de Rico" "KESI" "Machu Picchu" (with Evaluna Montaner)
Paris, France (UTC+0200)	Champ de Mars		Black Eyed Peas	"Let's Get It Started" "Pump It" "Hit It" "Ritmo (Bad Boys for Life)" "Girl Like Me" "Where Is the Love?" "I Gotta Feeling"
Paris, France (UTC+0200)	Champ de Mars		Christine and the Queens	"Fais comme l'oiseau" "People, I've Been Sad" "Tilted" "Doesn't Matter (Voleur de soleil)" "Freedom"
Paris, France (UTC+0200)	Champ de Mars		Doja Cat	"Rules" "Juicy" "Like That" "Kiss Me More" "Tia Tamera" "Need to Know" "Say So"
Paris, France (UTC+0200)	Champ de Mars		Elton John	"Tiny Dancer" "Your Song" "After All" (with Charlie Puth) "Rocket Man"
Paris, France (UTC+0200)	Champ de Mars		Angélique Kidjo	”Mother Nature”
Paris, France (UTC+0200)	Champ de Mars		Måneskin	"I Wanna Be Your Slave" "Bury a Friend" "For Your Love" "Beggin'" "Zitti e buoni"
Paris, France (UTC+0200)	Champ de Mars		Fatma Said	
Paris, France (UTC+0200)	Champ de Mars		Ed Sheeran	"Shivers" "Thinking Out Loud" "Bloodstream" "Perfect" "Shape of You" "Bad Habits"
Lajatico, Italy (UTC+0200) (Note: Bocelli performs an annual show in his hometown, which this year was recorded to be broadcast as part of Global Citizen Live.)	Teatro del Silenzio		Andrea Bocelli	
London, United Kingdom (UTC+0100)	Sky Garden		Duran Duran	
London, United Kingdom (UTC+0100)	Sky Garden		Kylie Minogue	"Can't Get You Out of My Head" "Dance Floor Darling"
London, United Kingdom (UTC+0100)	Sky Garden		Rag'n'Bone Man	
London, United Kingdom (UTC+0100)	Sky Garden		Nile Rodgers and Chic	”Le Freak” “We Are Family”
London, United Kingdom (UTC+0100)	Sky Garden		Stormzy with Rabea Massaad	"Crown" "Rachael's Little Brother" "Lessons"
South America
Buenos Aires, Argentina (UTC-0300)	Kirchner Cultural Centre		Lali	"Boomerang" "Laligera" "Bailo Pa' Mi"
Rio de Janeiro, Brazil (UTC-0300)	Sugarloaf Mountain	Dedé Teicher	Criolo and DJ DanDan	"Sistema Obtuso" (with Tropkillaz)
Rio de Janeiro, Brazil (UTC-0300)	Sugarloaf Mountain	Dedé Teicher	Liniker	"Lili" "Baby 95"
Rio de Janeiro, Brazil (UTC-0300)	Sugarloaf Mountain	Dedé Teicher	Mart'nália	"Chamego Bom" "17 de Janiero" (with Mosquito)
Manaus, Brazil (UTC-0400)	the Amazon	Dedé Teicher	Alok	"Amazon" "Jungle Beat"
Manaus, Brazil (UTC-0400)	the Amazon	Dedé Teicher	Indigenous peoples of Brazil, including: Mapu (of the Huni Kuin); Aldeia Mutum (of the Yawanawa); Owerá-Kunumi MC; Rasú (of the Yawinawá); Guaraní people	"Amazon" "Jungle Beat"
North America
Louisville, United States (UTC-0400)	Highland Festival Grounds at the Kentucky Expo Center		Metallica	"Hardwired" "The Four Horsemen" "Home (Sanitarium)" "The Struggle Within" "My Friend of Misery" "The God That Failed" "Of Wolf and Man" "Nothing Else Matters" "Through the Never" "Don't Tread on Me" "Wherever I May Roam" "The Unforgiven" "Holier Than Thou" "Sad but True" "Enter Sandman" "Blackened" "Creeping Death"
New York City, United States (UTC-0400)	Great Lawn		Jon Batiste	"We Are" "Whatchutalkinbout" "I Need You" "Boyhood" "One Love" "Don't Worry, Be Happy" "Lean on Me" "Tell the Truth" "Cry" "Moonlight Sonata" "Don't Stop" "Freedom"
New York City, United States (UTC-0400)	Great Lawn		Burna Boy	"On the Low" "Jerusalema (Remix)" "Kilometre" "Anybody"
New York City, United States (UTC-0400)	Great Lawn		Camila Cabello	"Havana" "Never Be the Same" "Senorita" (with Shawn Mendes) "Empire State of Mind" "Don't Go Yet"
New York City, United States (UTC-0400)	Great Lawn		Alessia Cara	"Scars to Your Beautiful" "Best Days" "Stay"
New York City, United States (UTC-0400)	Great Lawn		Coldplay	"Higher Power" "Clocks" (with Lang Lang) "Fix You" (with Billie Eilish and Finneas O'Connell) "Viva la Vida" "Human Heart" (with We Are KING and Jacob Collier) "Jehovah" (with Esther Chungu and Jacob Collier) "Yellow" (with Camila Cabello and Shawn Mendes) "My Universe" (with BTS) "A Sky Full of Stars"
New York City, United States (UTC-0400)	Great Lawn		Billie Eilish	"Bad Guy" "My Future" "Oxytocin" "Your Power" "All the Good Girls Go to Hell" "Happier Than Ever"
New York City, United States (UTC-0400)	Great Lawn		Lang Lang	"Bohemian Rhapsody" "Imagine" (with Billy Porter) "The Greatest Love of All" "We Are the World" (with Young People's Chorus of New York City)
New York City, United States (UTC-0400)	Great Lawn		Cyndi Lauper	"Girls Just Want to Have Fun" "True Colors" (with Jon Batiste)
New York City, United States (UTC-0400)	Great Lawn		Lizzo	"Good as Hell" "Rumors" "Truth Hurts" "Juice"
New York City, United States (UTC-0400)	Great Lawn		Jennifer Lopez	"Cambia el Paso" (with Rauw Alejandro) "All I Have" (with LL Cool J) "I'm Glad" "I'm Real (Murder Remix)" (with Ja Rule) "Ain't It Funny (Murder Remix)" (with Ja Rule) "Jenny From the Block" (with Jadakiss) "On My Way"
New York City, United States (UTC-0400)	Great Lawn		Skip Marley	"One Love/Get Up, Stand Up" ("Bob Marley medley") (featuring Nile Rodgers, Angélique Kidjo, Jon Batiste, Chris Martin)
New York City, United States (UTC-0400)	Great Lawn		Meek Mill	"Going Bad" "I'm a Boss" "Dreams and Nightmares"
New York City, United States (UTC-0400)	Great Lawn		Shawn Mendes	"Wonder" "There's Nothing Holdin' Me Back" "If I Can't Have You" "Monster" "Treat You Better" "Summer of Love" "In My Blood"
New York City, United States (UTC-0400)	Great Lawn		Paul Simon	"The Boxer" "The Sound of Silence"
New York City, United States (UTC-0400)	Pier 17 (Note: In the week before the festival, the Fugees held a reunion concert in New York in support of Global Citizen.)		Fugees	"Ready or Not" "Zealots" "Killing Me Softly" "Fu-Gee-La" "Cause and Effect"
New York City, United States (UTC-0400)	Franklin D. Roosevelt Four Freedoms Park		Lorde	"Solar Power" "Fallen Fruit"
Berkeley, United States (UTC-0700)	William Randolph Hearst Greek Theatre		My Morning Jacket	"One Big Holiday" "Touch Me I'm Going to Scream Pt. 2" "Wordless Chorus" "Spring (Among the Living)" "Feel You" "Regularly Scheduled Programming" "Love Love Love" "Climbing the Ladder" "Run It" "Tropics (Erase Traces)" "Master Plan" "I'm Amazed" "Circuital" "Wasted" "Steam Engine" "What a Wonderful Man" "Phone Went West" "Victory Dance" "Touch Me I'm Going to Scream Pt. 1" "Mahgeetah"
Las Vegas, United States (UTC-0700)	MGM Grand Garden Arena		Ricky Martin	"Vente Pa' Ca" "Qué Rico Fuera" "Livin' la Vida Loca"
Las Vegas, United States (UTC-0700)	The Colosseum at Caesars Palace		Keith Urban	
Los Angeles, United States (UTC-0700)	Greek Theatre		5 Seconds of Summer	"She Looks So Perfect" "Teeth" "Ghost of You" "Youngblood"
Los Angeles, United States (UTC-0700)	Greek Theatre		Chloe x Halle	"Ungodly Hour" "Baby Girl" "Do It" "Have Mercy" "Cool People"
Los Angeles, United States (UTC-0700)	Greek Theatre		Green Day (Note: Prerecorded footage from September 3 performance at Dodger Stadium as part of Hella Mega Tour.)	"Pollyanna"; Boulevard of Broken Dreams; Longview
Los Angeles, United States (UTC-0700)	Greek Theatre		H.E.R.	"Inner City Blues (Make Me Wanna Holler)" "Bloody Waters" "Fight for You" "Hold On" "Are You Gonna Go My Way" "We Made It"
Los Angeles, United States (UTC-0700)	Greek Theatre		Adam Lambert	"Superpower"
Los Angeles, United States (UTC-0700)	Greek Theatre		Demi Lovato	"Anyone" "Mad World" (with Adam Lambert)
Los Angeles, United States (UTC-0700)	Greek Theatre		The Lumineers	"Cleopatra" "Brightside" "Ophelia" "Gloria" "Stubborn Love"
Los Angeles, United States (UTC-0700)	Greek Theatre		Migos	"Avalanche" "Bad and Boujee"
Los Angeles, United States (UTC-0700)	Greek Theatre		OneRepublic	"Good Life" "I Lived" "Secrets" "Apologize" "Someday" "Counting Stars"
Los Angeles, United States (UTC-0700)	Greek Theatre		Ozuna	"MAMACITA" "Caramelo" "Del Mar" "Taki Taki"
Los Angeles, United States (UTC-0700)	Greek Theatre		Stevie Wonder	"Superstition" (with H.E.R.) "Overjoyed" "The Living Killing Life" "This I Know" (with Sheila E. and OneRepublic)
Unknown			DJ Snake	
Unknown			Deborra-Lee Furness	
Unknown			Hugh Jackman	
Unknown			Usher	
Unknown			The Weeknd	

== Appearances ==
=== Politicians and leaders ===
- Ban Ki-moon
- Xavier Bettel
- Chris Coons
- Bill de Blasio
- Mario Draghi
- Meryame Kitir
- David Malpass
- Micheál Martin
- Strive Masiyiwa
- Narendra Modi
- Nancy Pelosi
- Andrej Plenković
- Pedro Sánchez
- Chuck Schumer
- Erna Solberg
- Aaditya Thackeray
- Ursula von der Leyen

=== Conservationists ===
- Jane Goodall
- Monja Cohen
- Sadhguru

=== Entertainers ===
- Amitabh Bachchan

== Broadcast ==
The festival was broadcast around the world and was available to livestream on various platforms.

- Nine Network in Australia
- VRT in Belgium
- Multishow and Bis in Brazil
- Caracol Televisión in Colombia
- TF1 and TMC in France and Monaco
- Zee TV in India
- NET in Indonesia
- Sky Uno and TV8 in Italy
- TV Azteca in Mexico
- SABC in South Africa
- RTVE Play in Spain
- BBC in the United Kingdom
- ABC (live) and FX in the United States

The television broadcast in the United Kingdom was stopped for a period to show Strictly Come Dancing, but all performances were available via the BBC iPlayer.

Broadcasting live to the same feed from six continents and the International Space Station posed a technical challenge described as "once in a generation".
