= Redcar (disambiguation) =

Redcar is a town in the north east of England.

Redcar may also refer to:

- Redcar and Cleveland, a unitary authority area which includes the town
- The Murmurs, a band which had a successor known as "Redcar"
- Redcar les adorables étoiles (prologue), album by Christine and the Queens
- Redcar (UK Parliament constituency), a borough constituency in the House of Commons containing the town of Redcar
- Rahim Redcar (born 1998), French singer

== See also ==
- Pacific Electric, mass transit company nicknamed the "Red Cars"
