= Paranoia, Angels, True Love =

Studio album by Christine and the Queens
- Released: 9 June 2023
- Genres: Art pop; experimental pop
- Length: 96:49
- Languages: English; French
- Label: Because
- Producers: Christine and the Queens; Mike Dean; Sarah Schachner; Ash Workman; Tommy Rush; A. G. Cook

Christine and the Queens chronology
Redcar les adorables étoiles (prologue) (2022)	Paranoia, Angels, True Love (2023)	Hopecore (2024)

Singles from Paranoia, Angels, True Love
- 1. "To Be Honest" Released: 8 March 2023; 2. "True Love" Released: 17 April 2023; 3. "Tears Can Be So Soft" Released: 9 May 2023; 4. "A Day in the Water" Released: 7 June 2023

Paranoia, Angels, True Love (also written as Paranoïa, Angels, True Love) is the fourth studio album by the French singer Christine and the Queens, released through Because Music on 9 June 2023. It comprises the second, third and fourth parts of a series following Redcar les adorables étoiles (prologue) (2022), on which Héloïse Letissier adopted the moniker "Redcar". The album was preceded by the single "To Be Honest", and includes collaborations with Madonna, 070 Shake and Mike Dean.

== Background ==
Héloïse Letissier called the album "the second part of an operatic gesture" including Redcar les adorables étoiles (prologue) (2022), and noted that it was inspired by "the glorious dramaturgy" of Tony Kushner's play Angels in America (1991). He also called it "a key towards heart-opening transformation, a prayer towards the self".

== Critical reception ==
Professional ratings
Aggregate scores
Source	Rating
AnyDecentMusic?	7.6/10
Metacritic	78/100
Review scores
Source	Rating
AllMusic	3.5/5 stars
DIY	5/5 stars
Evening Standard	5/5 stars
The Guardian	5/5 stars
The Independent	3/5 stars
The Line of Best Fit	9/10
Pitchfork	6.8/10
The Skinny	4/5 stars
Slant Magazine	3.5/5 stars
The Telegraph	3/5 stars

Paranoia, Angels, True Love received a score of 78 out of 100 on review aggregator Metacritic based on 14 critics' reviews, indicating "universal acclaim". Otis Robinson of DIY found that "the record's brilliance lies in an innovative ocean of modern opera, blending elements of soul, pop, trap, R&B, drum 'n' bass and musical theatre", but that the "presence of hip hop producer Mike Dean on the album lends a post-pop sound". He concluded that it is "a far way away from debut Chaleur humaine, yet just as unafraid", and "like no other exploration of grief – a new magnum opus".

Rachel Aroesti of The Guardian described Paranoia, Angels, True Love as a "masterpiece" where the despair of Letissier over the recent death of his mother "sublimated into astonishingly beautiful experimental pop, drenched in warm celestial light, punctured by spikes of confused pain", and produced a work that is "hypnotically melodic, clever, stylish, serious, fun, addictively unexpected and euphorically danceable." Eric Mason of Slant Magazine described the album as "the culmination of the French singer's ambitious approach to pop conventions" as well as "a collection of wiry, introspective songs that break from pop conventions while asserting the life-affirming power of love".

David Smyth of the Evening Standard found Paranoia, Angels, True Love to be "weird and absolutely wonderful" in contrast to the "weird and alienating" Redcar, with "songs of breathtaking beauty" that are a "long way from the smooth, sophisticated electronic pop" of Chaleur humaine. Reviewing the album for The Line of Best Fit, Tanatat Khuttapan opined that it is Letissier's "largest, most ambitious album to date" and "as enthralling and enigmatic as the tales of the mystique, embellished in epic theatrics and artful references", but found that some tracks would work better as "spoken poems [...] due to their slack, unmoving instrumentation".

Helen Brown of The Independent summarised the album as "requiring serious investment on the listener's part" as it is "too long and rambling to bring Christine and the Queens any new fans, or much action on the singles chart. Its self-indulgence may even tire some existing fans. But if you give it time to grow its wings, it can really lift you up." Reviewing the album for AllMusic, Heather Phares compared it less favourably to Letissier's previous work, writing: "As a whole it doesn't feel as rewarding as the diamond-like clarity and brilliance of Chris or La Vita Nuova. Even if it's missing some of the electrifying immediacy of those works, there's a lot of challenging and emotionally powerful music here for fans to appreciate."

Neil McCormick of The Telegraph wrote that "with every new release, the work of Heloise Letissier becomes harder to summarise", finding there to be "many absolutely gorgeous moments" but that "the overwhelming mood is oppressive as it proceeds at a relentlessly mid tempo pace [...], frequently building to bombastic quasi-religious choral electro goth climaxes, with crunching drums, overloaded vocals and wailing lead guitar". He ultimately called it "a lot". Peyton Thomas of Pitchfork summarised that the album is a "raw, dreamlike, 20-song epic that still feels like a first draft" and that for "every stunner" track ("Tears Can Be So Soft", "I Met an Angel" and "True Love"), there is "a head-scratcher" ("Full of Life", "Let Me Touch You" and "Aimer, puis vivre"), comparing the latter set of tracks to Roman marble statues "stripped, over millennia, of their paint" and calling them "not all fully formed, and often crying out for color".

== Track listing ==
All lyrics are written by Héloise Letissier.

Disc one: Paranoia track listing
No.	Title	Music	Producer(s)	Length
1.	"Overture"	Letissier; Joseph Bishara; Mike Dean	Christine and the Queens; Dean	1:23
2.	"Tears Can Be So Soft"	Letissier; Dean; Sarah Schachner; Leon Ware; Marvin Gaye	Christine and the Queens; Dean; Schachner^{[a]}	5:11
3.	"Marvin Descending"	Letissier; Bishara; Dean; Ash Workman	Christine and the Queens; Dean; Workman	4:06
4.	"A Day in the Water"	Letissier; Workman	Christine and the Queens; Dean; Workman	4:01
5.	"Full of Life"	Letissier; Dean; Tommy Rush; Johann Pachelbel	Christine and the Queens; Dean; Rush^{[a]}	4:32
6.	"Angels Crying in My Bed" (featuring Madonna)	Letissier; Dean	Christine and the Queens; Dean	4:26
7.	"Track 10"	Letissier; Dean; Darren King; Gregory Lake	Christine and the Queens; Dean	11:09

Disc two: Angels track listing
No.	Title	Music	Producer(s)	Length
1.	"Overture" (featuring Mike Dean)	Letissier; Dean	Christine and the Queens; Dean	1:26
2.	"He's Been Shining for Ever, Your Son"	Letissier; Dean	Christine and the Queens; Dean	5:01
3.	"Flowery Days"	Letissier; Workman	Christine and the Queens	3:00
4.	"I Met an Angel" (featuring Madonna)	Letissier; Dean; Bishara; King	Christine and the Queens; Dean	6:06
5.	"True Love" (featuring 070 Shake)	Letissier; Dean; Danielle Balbuena; Schachner	Christine and the Queens; Dean; Schachner^{[a]}	5:47
6.	"Let Me Touch You Once" (featuring 070 Shake)	Letissier; Dean	Dean	3:15
7.	"Aimer, puis vivre"	Letissier; Workman	Christine and the Queens	4:50

Disc three: True Love track listing
No.	Title	Music	Producer(s)	Length
1.	"Shine"	Letissier; Dean	Christine and the Queens; Dean	5:52
2.	"We Have to Be Friends"	Letissier; Dean; King	Christine and the Queens; Dean; Workman^{[a]}	4:14
3.	"Lick the Light Out" (featuring Madonna)	Letissier; Dean; Bishara; King	Christine and the Queens; Dean; A. G. Cook^{[a]}	6:31
4.	"To Be Honest"	Letissier; Dean	Christine and the Queens; Dean; Workman^{[a]}	3:41
5.	"I Feel Like an Angel"	Letissier; Dean	Christine and the Queens; Dean	4:31
6.	"Big Eye"	Letissier; Dean; Bishara; King	Christine and the Queens; Dean	7:47
Total length:				96:49

=== Notes ===
- ^{^[a]} signifies an additional producer

=== Sample credits ===
- "Tears Can Be So Soft" contains a sample of Marvin Gaye's "Feel All My Love Inside", written by Gaye and Leon Ware.
- "Full of Life" contains a sample of Johann Pachelbel's Canon in D.
- "Track 10" contains a sample of Emerson, Lake & Palmer's "Lucky Man", written by Greg Lake.

== Charts ==
Chart performance for Paranoïa, Angels, True Love
Chart (2023)	Peak position
Belgian Albums (Ultratop Flanders)	9
Belgian Albums (Ultratop Wallonia)	9
French Albums (SNEP)	19
German Albums (Offizielle Top 100)	40
Scottish Albums (Official Charts)	7
Swiss Albums (Schweizer Hitparade)	25
UK Albums (Official Charts)	7
UK Independent Albums (Official Charts)	2
US Top Album Sales (Billboard)	97
US Heatseekers Albums (Billboard)	24
