= Too Many T's =

Too Many T's are a British rap and hip hop band from London, England, consisting of Leon Rhymes and Ross Standaloft.

Their style is compared to Beastie Boys.

In September 2017, they released their debut album South City.
