= Redcar les adorables étoiles (prologue) =

Studio album by Christine and the Queens (Note: In June 2024, Letissier's other stage name Rahim C Redcar was added as an additional artist for the album on streaming platforms.)
- Released: 11 November 2022
- Genre: Synth-pop
- Length: 53:06
- Language: French; English
- Label: Because
- Producer: Christine and the Queens

Christine and the Queens chronology
La vita nuova (2020)	Redcar les adorables étoiles (prologue) (2022)	Paranoia, Angels, True Love (2023)

Singles from Redcar les adorables étoiles (prologue)
- 1. "Je te vois enfin" Released: 24 June 2022; 2. "Rien dire" Released: 26 September 2022; 3. "La chanson du chevalier" Released: 11 October 2022

Redcar les adorables étoiles (prologue) (transl. Redcar the Adorable Stars (Prologue)) is the third studio album by French singer Christine and the Queens, released on 11 November 2022. On the album, Héloïse Letissier adopts the moniker Redcar, just as he adopted the moniker Chris on his previous album, Chris (2018). It is the first album in a series, with the second Redcar album, Paranoia, Angels, True Love, following on 9 June 2023. It was preceded by the singles "Je te vois enfin", "Rien dire" and "La chanson du chevalier". Christine and the Queens performed two shows at the Cirque d'hiver in Paris in promotion of the album in November 2022, and at the Royal Festival Hall in London on 22 November.

== Background ==
Letissier worked on the album with producer Mike Dean, who contacted him in 2021 and "suggested they collaborate", with Letissier then traveling to Los Angeles to work with Dean. Letissier recorded the album in two weeks, and described it as a rock opera. Letissier adopted the persona of Redcar for the project, with Redcar being described as a "suave figure wearing a red glove". Letissier adopted the name after repeatedly seeing red cars while in Los Angeles in 2020. Following his mother's death in 2019, he took it as a "superstitious sign", explaining: "It was as if an angel was nodding along, sprinkling its magic into my world. It's my choice to live in this strange, beautiful poetry, and Redcar is emblematic of that choice."

The album's release was delayed from 28 September to 11 November 2022 due to Letissier being injured during rehearsals.

== Critical reception ==
Professional ratings
Aggregate scores
Source	Rating
Metacritic	71/100
Review scores
Source	Rating
AllMusic	4/5 stars
DIY	4.5/5 stars
Exclaim!	8/10
The Guardian	3/5 stars
The Independent	4/5 stars
NME	3/5 stars
Pitchfork	6.2/10
The Skinny	4/5 stars

On review aggregator Metacritic, the album has a score of 71 out of 100 based on 17 critics' reviews, indicating "generally favorable" reception. Heather Phares of AllMusic wrote, "Artistic development and self-discovery are endless journeys, but Redcar les adorables étoiles' vulnerability, confidence, and imagination often feel like a culmination of Christine and the Queens' work. By not forcing Redcar's music into a pop template when it doesn't fit, the album reaffirms him as a resolutely independent artist and makes another fine addition to a nearly flawless discography."

El Hunt of NME described the album as "Cloaked in eerie clouds and lurches of gloomy synthesiser", calling it Letissier's "darkest work musically: though it shares La Vita Nuova's high art leanings, the stage is set differently this time; few of these songs come with soaring choruses". Hunt concluded that "though these are often beautiful and uneasy songs, too many of them feel rudderless". Reviewing the album for Rolling Stone, Kory Grow characterised the record as an "avant-garde pop opera" and felt that Letissier "still pines for romance, sex, and acceptance over sparse pop arrangements" as well as "new-wave synths, muscular bass riffs, and, of course, Chris' breathy, cutting vocals — but he's stretched the nature of the music out into something more progressive with a few dance-floor–ready moments for good measure".

Alexis Petridis of The Guardian opined that the album "largely seem[s] to be breakup songs, with the protagonist very much the injured party" and the listener "start[s] to wonder whether its dejected lyrical tone might not have as much of a bearing on [its] shortcomings as time constraints or bloody-mindedness". He concluded that it shows "flashes of inspiration that ultimately lead to frustration". Writing for Pitchfork, Sophie Kemp described Redcar as a "transitional album", "a frustrating listen from a brilliantly talented artist" and "a very quiet collection of songs with all the weight of ephemera".

== Track listing ==
All lyrics are written by Héloïse Letissier; all music is composed by Héloïse Letissier, except where noted.

Redcar les adorables étoiles (prologue) track listing
No.	Title	Music	Length
1.	"Ma bien aimée bye bye"		4:31
2.	"Tu sais ce qu'il me faut"		4:45
3.	"La chanson du chevalier"		3:36
4.	"Rien dire"	Letissier; Prinzly; Ash Workman; Ponko	3:02
5.	"La clairefontaine"		3:14
6.	"Les étoiles"		3:19
7.	"Mémoire des ailes"		2:37
8.	"Looking for Love"		3:14
9.	"My Birdman"	Letissier; Francis Teddy Osei; Norman Gimbel; Charles Fox; Michael Tontoh	4:20
10.	"Combien de temps"	Letissier; Claudia De Held	8:30
11.	"Je te vois enfin"		3:25
12.	"Angelus"		4:40
13.	"Les âmes amantes"		3:47
Total length:			53:06

== Charts ==
Chart performance for Redcar les adorables étoiles (prologue)
Chart (2022)	Peak position
Australian Digital Albums (ARIA)	23
Belgian Albums (Ultratop Flanders)	25
Belgian Albums (Ultratop Wallonia)	22
French Albums (SNEP)	36
Scottish Albums (Official Charts)	15
Swiss Albums (Schweizer Hitparade)	36
UK Albums (Official Charts)	45
UK Independent Albums (Official Charts)	7
