= Aufgang =

Aufgang (Ascent) is a violin concerto written by the French composer Pascal Dusapin for Renaud Capuçon between 2008 and 2011. The violinist premièred it in 2013 in Cologne. He subsequently performed it in Seattle, London and in Switzerland, before recording it with Myung-whun Chung conducting the Orchestre Philharmonique de Radio France in 2015.

Since its première, the concerto has been taken up by other soloists, notably Viktoria Mullova and Carolin Widmann.

== Overview ==
Dusapin started writing Aufgang in 2008 but set it aside after a while. A meeting with Capuçon some time later inspired him to pick it up again and finish it in 2011. The work can be seen as a struggle between emerging light (the violin) and menacing shadows (the orchestra). Indeed, according to the composer, "the conflict between darkness and dazzlement becomes the driving force" in the concerto.

It follows the traditional three-movement concerto structure and lasts about 30 minutes.

The piece starts with the violin playing in the extremely high register, in striking contrast with the accompanying low cellos and double basses. Tension increasingly grows as the music progresses and more instruments intervene. The second movement is the longest of the three. Here, the soloist is joined by a quasi-ritualistic flute and the two enter into dialogue. Finally, the brief last movement sees the violin fleeing back to the highest register above wild orchestral outbursts.

== Reception ==
Aufgang been described as "a wonderfully coherent work of irresistible sweep" that provides "real substance" and "was composed by Dusapin with enormous finesse".

== Discography ==
- Rihm, Dusapin, Mantovani: Violin Concertos, Renaud Capuçon (violin), Orchestre Philharmonique de Radio France, Myung-whun Chung (conductor ), 2016, Erato-2564 602687.
- Pascal Dusapin: Concertante Works, Carolin Widmann (violin) Orchestre National des Pays de la Loire, Pascal Rophé (conductor), 2018, BIS-2262.
