= La vita nuova (song) =

Single by Christine and the Queens featuring Caroline Polachek

from the EP La vita nuova
- Language: Italian; English
- Released: 14 August 2020
- Length: 4:28
- Label: Because Music
- Songwriter: Héloïse Létissier
- Producers: Christine and the Queens; Ash Workman

Christine and the Queens singles chronology
"I Disappear In Your Arms" (2020)	"La vita nuova" (2020)	"3SEX" (2020)

Caroline Polachek singles chronology
"Look at Me Now" (2019)	"La vita nuova" (2020)	"The Gate (Extended Mix)" (2020)

"La vita nuova" (English: The New Life) is a song by French singer-songwriter and producer Christine and the Queens featuring American singer Caroline Polachek, from the EP of the same name. He performed the song on the Global Goal: Unite for Our Future concert on 27 June 2020. On 11 August 2020, Christine announced that a series of remix EPs of the album's title track would be released, with the first and second EPs released on 14 August and 28 August respectively.

== Track listing ==
Remixes, Part 1

1. "La vita nuova" (A. G. Cook Remix) (featuring Caroline Polachek) – 4:34
2. "La vita nuova" (Populous Remix) (featuring Caroline Polachek) – 3:51
3. "La vita nuova" (Logic100 Remix) (featuring Caroline Polachek) – 3:45

Remixes, Part 2

1. "La vita nuova" (Planningtorock's Queered Version) (featuring Caroline Polachek) – 4:58
2. "La vita nuova" (Tiger & Woods Remix) (featuring Caroline Polachek) – 5:38
3. "La vita nuova" (Daniele Baldelli & Marco Dionigo Remix) (featuring Caroline Polachek) – 6:25
4. "La vita nuova" (Palazo Remix) (featuring Caroline Polachek) – 6:17
5. "La vita nuova" (A. G. Cook Remix) (featuring Caroline Polachek) – 4:34
6. "La vita nuova" (Populous Remix) (featuring Caroline Polachek) – 3:51
7. "La vita nuova" (Logic100 Remix) (featuring Caroline Polachek) – 3:45

== Charts ==
Chart (2020)	Peak position
US World Digital Song Sales (Billboard)	20
