= 5 dols =

"5 dols"/"5 Dollars"

Single by Christine and the Queens

from the album Chris
- Language: French; English
- Released: 16 August 2018
- Recorded: 2018
- Genre: Synth-pop; electro-funk
- Length: 3:28
- Label: Because
- Songwriter(s): Christine and the Queens
- Producer(s): Christine and the Queens; Cole M.G.N.

Christine and the Queens English singles chronology
"Doesn't Matter" (2018)	"5 Dollars" (2018)	"The Walker" (2018)

"5 dols", also known under its English title "5 Dollars", is a song by French singer Christine and the Queens. "5 Dollars" was released as the third single from the English version of his second studio album Chris on 16 August 2018. Christine and the Queens performed the song on The Graham Norton Show on 19 October 2018.

== Background ==
Christine and the Queens explained about the meaning of the song: "The song is so tender, so disheveled. It's dealing with some kind of love – the kind you can buy. It's a literal interpretation. A note for a shag – how surprisingly soothing this can be! The power ratio runs clear, like water in your hands; it becomes a pure gesture of love, of ultimate consent."

== Music video ==
The video for the track's English version was directed by Colin Solal Cardo released on Christine and the Queens' YouTube channel on 17 August 2018. Billboard noted it as being "S&M-inspired". The video was also described in a press release as "American Gigolo with a twist".

== Personnel ==
- Chris – drum programming, bass, keyboards, piano
- Cole M.G.N. – drum programming, bass

== Charts ==
Chart (2018–19)	Peak position
Belgium (Ultratip Bubbling Under Flanders)	12
Belgium (Ultratop 50 Wallonia)	28
French Downloads (SNEP)	83
Scotland (OCC)	38
US Dance Club Songs (Billboard)	12

== Release history ==
Region	Date	Format	Ref.
France	16 August 2018	Digital download	
United Kingdom	16 August 2018	Digital download	
