= People, I've Been Sad =

Single by Christine and the Queens

from the EP La vita nuova
- Language: English; French
- Released: 5 February 2020
- Genre: Synth-pop
- Length: 4:20
- Label: Because Music
- Songwriter: Héloïse Létissier
- Producers: Christine and the Queens; Ash Workman

Christine and the Queens singles chronology
"Gone" (2019)	"People, I've Been Sad" (2020)	"I Disappear in Your Arms" (2020)

"People, I've Been Sad" (stylized in sentence case or sometimes as "People, I've been Sad") is a song by French singer and songwriter Christine and the Queens. The song was released to digital retailers on 5 February 2020 and to American adult alternative radio on 17 February 2020. The song features lyrics in both English and French. Christine performed the song on the Together at Home concert pre-show, as well as on The Late Show with Stephen Colbert.

== Critical reception ==
"People, I've Been Sad" received widespread critical acclaim. Kory Grow of Rolling Stone compared the song to his previous single "Girlfriend" and commented on the layered emotions of the song. He pointed out that while the song is shockingly direct and features "a starkness here that hasn't been as pronounced in some of [his] previous songs", Christine sings these honest lyrics with a sense of ennui. Stacy Anderson from Pitchfork called it "genuine and striking" and praised its intimate nature.

=== Accolades ===
The song was named the best song of 2020 by Paste and Time, the second best song by NPR and Pitchfork, the third by The Guardian and Rolling Stone, and the sixth by Crack Magazine. The song was also included on NME's year-end list at number 11, Consequence's at 21, Billboard's at 22, and Vice's at 52. In September 2024, Pitchfork included "People, I've Been Sad" on their list of "The 100 Best Songs of the 2020s So Far", ranking it at number 64.

== Charts ==
Chart performance for "People, I've Been Sad"
Chart (2020)
Belgium (Ultratip Bubbling Under Flanders)	18
Belgium (Ultratip Bubbling Under Wallonia)	50
US World Digital Song Sales (Billboard)	13
