= La vita nuova (EP) =

EP by Christine and the Queens
- Released: 27 February 2020
- Studios: Electric Beach (Margate, UK); Motorbass (Paris, France); Question de Son (Paris, France)
- Genre: Electropop
- Length: 22:15
- Languages: English; French; Italian
- Label: Because Music
- Producers: Christine and the Queens; Ash Workman

Christine and the Queens chronology
Chris (2018)	La vita nuova (2020)	Redcar les adorables étoiles (prologue) (2022)

Singles from La vita nuova
- 1. "People, I've Been Sad" Released: 5 February 2020; 2. "I Disappear In Your Arms" Released: 8 June 2020; 3. "La vita nuova" Released: 14 August 2020

La vita nuova (English: The New Life) is an extended play by French singer-songwriter Christine and the Queens. The EP was released digitally alongside an accompanying short film on 27 February 2020 through Because Music, with CD and vinyl versions following on 29 May 2020. A double 7" containing two of the EP's tracks and a live piano version of each was released on Record Store Day. The two live versions were featured on an expanded edition of the EP, released on 27 February 2021. The title track is Christine's first song to feature lyrics in Italian since "Science Fiction" from his debut album Chaleur humaine.

The short film was nominated for Video of the Year at the 2021 Libera Awards, Christine's first nomination.

== Promotion ==
=== Singles ===
The EP was preceded by the single "People, I've Been Sad" on 5 February 2020. "I Disappear in Your Arms" was performed on The Graham Norton Show on 17 April 2020. "I Disappear In Your Arms" was released to American Adult album alternative radio on June 8, 2020. An EP of remixes of the title track was released on 14 August 2020.

=== Live performances ===
"I Disappear In Your Arms" was performed on The Graham Norton Show on 17 April 2020. "People, I've Been Sad" and "Mountains (We Met)" were performed on the Together at Home concert pre-show on 18 April 2020. He performed "People, I've Been Sad" on The Late Show with Stephen Colbert on 7 May 2020. "I Disappear in Your Arms" was performed on The Tonight Show with Jimmy Fallon on 12 June 2020. The performance was done remotely from La Cigale in Paris on an empty stage. All of these performances were done virtually due to COVID-19 social distancing restrictions.

=== La vita nuova : séquences 2 et 3 ===
For Record Store Day on 29 August 2020, Christine released La vita nuova : séquences 2 et 3, a companion EP. The double seven-inch vinyl includes renditions of "Je disparais dans tes bras" and "Mountains (We Met)" recorded at Studios Saint Germain, as well as the studio versions of the tracks.

== Short film ==
The film takes place in the famed Palais Garnier opera house and portrays an infatuation between Christine and a hellish creature called "The Faun" (portrayed by Félix Maritaud). It is directed by Colin Solal Cardo and features choreography by Ryan Heffington.

== Critical reception ==
Professional ratings
Aggregate scores
Source	Rating
Metacritic	89/100
Review scores
Source	Rating
AllMusic	4/5 stars
Clash	8/10
DIY Magazine	4.5/5 stars
NME	5/5 stars
Paste	8.8/10
Pitchfork	7.8/10

La vita nuova was met with critical acclaim upon its initial release, with many calling it his strongest work up to that point. The EP has been given a weighted rating aggregate of 89 out of 100 by Metacritic, based on 7 reviews, indicating "universal acclaim".

Heather Phares praised the EP in the review for AllMusic, writing that "True to [his] art, [he] continues to push [himself] on this EP, transmuting the bold energy of [his] previous album into a moodier and more reflective set of songs." In the review for Clash, Robin Murray concluded that "A potent climax, it underlines the self-contained creativity at work across ‘La vita nuova’, a rich, rewarding, and extremely direct return, one worth observing on its own terms." Writing for Paste, Austin Jones stated that the EP, "sounds like a collection of essentials for a soon-to-be prolific artist."

Variety called the EP "arguably [his] best work to date". NME gave the EP the perfect score and said "Conceptually, La Vita Nuova is an astonishing feat – but even better than that, it also oozes an intensity of feeling that punches right in the gut." They also complimented the video's allusions to the original La Vita Nuova painting. Reviewing the album for DIY Magazine, James Bentley proclaimed that while "Confined to merely six tracks, the ‘La vita nuova’ EP feels like it ends too soon - and that's entirely symptomatic of how strong the songwriting is. In 2020, Christine is still truly in a league of [his] own."

Pitchfork writer Anna Gaca was more reserved when appraising the album; "With its Thriller-esque flash and tomato-red fake blood, the film La vita nuova looks like a kind of theater-kid fever dream. But that’s what theater is for: The emotions that feel too unruly, too ambiguous, to survive in the real world. They need space, just as dancers do, and Chris’ could fill the house."

== Track listing ==
All tracks are written by Christine and the Queens.

La vita nuova track listing
No.	Title	Length
1.	"People, I've Been Sad"	4:20
2.	"Je disparais dans tes bras"	3:55
3.	"Mountains (We Met)"	2:49
4.	"Nada"	2:47
5.	"La vita nuova" (featuring Caroline Polachek)	4:28
6.	"I Disappear in Your Arms" (bonus track)	3:56
Total length:		22:15

Expanded edition bonus tracks
No.	Title	Length
7.	"Je disparais dans tes bras" (Studios Saint Germain Session)	4:06
8.	"Mountains (We Met)" (Studios Saint Germain Session)	2:53
Total length:		29:14

Expanded edition bonus video
No.	Title	Length
9.	"La vita nuova" (Short film)	13:47
Total length:		43:01

Notes

- All English track titles are stylized in sentence case
- "I Disappear in Your Arms" is the English-language counterpart of "Je disparais dans tes bras".

== Personnel ==
- Christine and the Queens – production; vocals, drum programming, piano, synthesizer, bass synthesizer
- Ash Workman – production, mixing, recording; drum programming, synthesizer, bass synthesizer
- Antoine Poyeton – recording assistance
- Thomas Rasoanaivo – recording assistance
- Raven Bush – strings (1, 3)
- Michael Lovett – strings (1)
- Mike Bozzi – mastering

== Charts ==
Sales chart performance for La vita nuova
Chart (2020)	Peak position
Belgian Albums (Ultratop Flanders)	58
Belgian Albums (Ultratop Wallonia)	28
French Albums (SNEP)	27
Scottish Albums (Official Charts)	5
Swiss Albums (Schweizer Hitparade)	32
UK Albums (Official Charts)	37
UK Album Downloads (Official Charts)	3
UK Independent Albums (OCC)	12
US World Albums (Billboard)	15
