= Rahim Redcar =

French singer (born 1988)

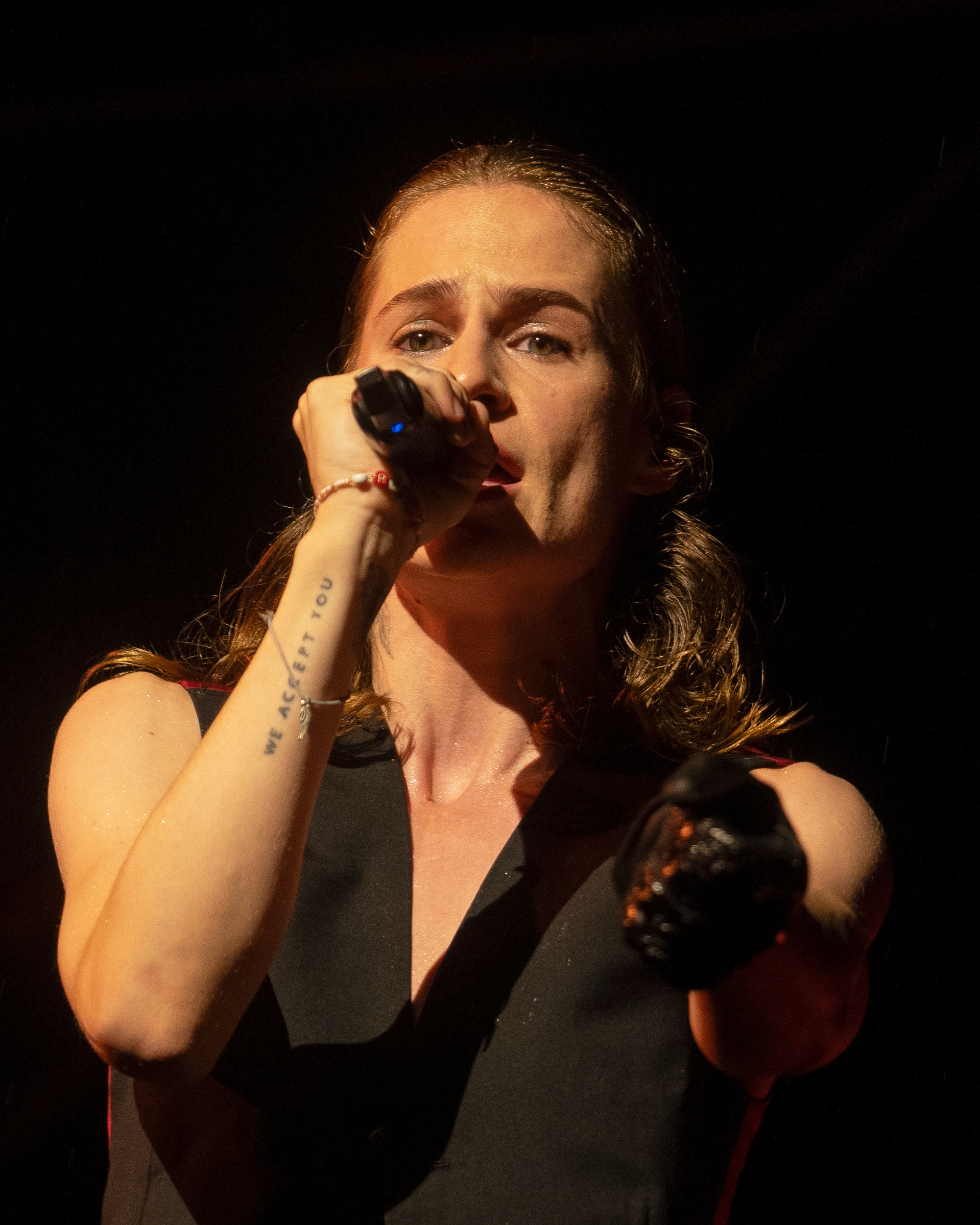
- Redcar performing in 2023

Background information
- Also known as: Christine and the Queens; Chris; Redcar
- Born: Héloïse Adélaïde Letissier; 1 June 1988 (age 38); Nantes, Pays de la Loire, France
- Genres: Pop; synth-pop; art pop; electropop; indie pop; experimental pop; alternative R&B
- Occupations: Singer; songwriter
- Years active: 2010–present
- Labels: Because Music (France); Neon Gold (U.S.)
- Awards: Full list
- Website: rahimredcar.com

Rahim Claude Redcar (born 1 June 1988) is a French singer and songwriter best known under the pseudonym of Christine and the Queens. Born female, he self-identifies as male and uses male pronouns. Raised in Nantes, he started learning piano aged four and found inspiration in one of London's clubs while studying. Redcar released a series of extended plays (EPs) throughout 2011–2013.

Redcar's debut studio album, Chaleur humaine (2014), received critical acclaim, reached number two in the French and UK charts, and was certified diamond in France; it was also a best-selling debut record in the United Kingdom. In 2018, he released his second studio album, Chris, to further critical acclaim. It was ranked album of the year by Clash, The Guardian, and The Independent, and placed in the top-ten of nine other year-end lists. "Girlfriend" was recognized by Time as song of the year. In reaction to his mother's death, Redcar released an EP in 2020 La vita nuova, with some critics calling it his strongest work up to that point. Time again named his song, "People, I've Been Sad", the song of the year. Ensuing years saw the releases of Redcar les adorables étoiles (prologue) (2022) and Paranoia, Angels, True Love (2023), which were met with critical acclaim but did not achieve the commercial success of his previous releases. In 2024, he released Hopecore, a more dance-inflected album.

In 2016, Redcar was ranked number one in Vanity Fair's list of most powerful and influential French people who "promote French ingenuity", ahead of the country's president. The next year, Forbes placed him on its list of 30 most influential and talented people under 30, and Time included him on its list of Next Generation Leaders twice – in 2016 and 2018. His accolades include four Victories of Music awarded by the French Ministry of Culture. Christine and the Queens has been signed to the independent record label Because Music since 2012.

In August 2022, he stated in a TikTok video in French that his gender journey was "a long process" and explained that he had gendered himself in the masculine for about a year, which he had shared with family and close friends. He subsequently updated his pronouns to he/him across social media platforms. He has stated that he is "in resistance to the approach of trans identity that there has to be hormones and operations", which he considers a form of binarism.

== Early life ==
Rahim Redcar was born Héloïse Adélaïde Letissier on 1 June 1988 in Nantes. His father, Georges Letissier, taught English literature at the University of Nantes and specialises in Victorian era literature. His mother, Martine Letissier, taught French and Latin at a local middle school. Martine died suddenly from a heart infection in April 2019, in the week between Redcar‘s two scheduled Coachella performances on 13 and 20 April. The latter performance was cancelled because Redcar travelled back to France to be with his mother.

Redcar began learning to play the piano at the age of four, learned classical dance at five, and then modern jazz. His parents recommended to him writers such as Sarah Waters and Judith Butler, whose works served both as inspiration and reference in Redcar‘s youth. He attended Lycée Clemenceau learning theatre and then Lycée Fénelon secondary school in Paris learning literature. He later studied at the Department of Arts of École normale supérieure de Lyon (ENS Lyon) and studied drama at the Lyon Regional Conservatory.

== Career ==
=== 2010–2013: Career beginnings ===
Redcar's first performance as Christine and the Queens was at a small Lyon club in 2010. That same year, Redcar dropped out of the drama conservatory he was attending out of frustration at not being allowed to direct, as well as feeling depressed after a romantic break-up. He made a trip to London and was inspired by the work of local drag queen musicians, including Russella, at the Soho nightclub Madame Jojo's. The queens then became 'the Queens' in his stage name as a tribute. As soon as he returned to France, he left the ENSL grande école in the middle of the second year to devote himself fully to the musical project now called "Christine and the Queens". He dedicated many of his creations to them, and to all transgender individuals, describing his genre as "freakpop".

He released his debut extended play, Miséricorde, in 2011, with Marc Lumbroso (Jean-Jacques Goldman's producer). His second EP, titled Mac Abbey, followed in 2012, with minor hits "Narcissus Is Back" and "Cripple". The same year, he was the opening act for Lykke Li, the Dø, and Woodkid. Redcar won the Best Discovered Act award, known as "Découverte", at the Printemps de Bourges music festival and also won the "Première Francos" award at the Les Francofolies de La Rochelle festival. Then he signed with the independent label Because Music.

In 2013, Redcar was the opening act for Lilly Wood and the Prick and Gaëtan Roussel. On 3 June, he released the single, and also an EP of the same name, titled "Nuit 17 à 52", which garnered him his first charting on the official French SNEP albums chart. The song was the first single of his forthcoming studio album.

=== 2014–2017: Christine and the Queens ===
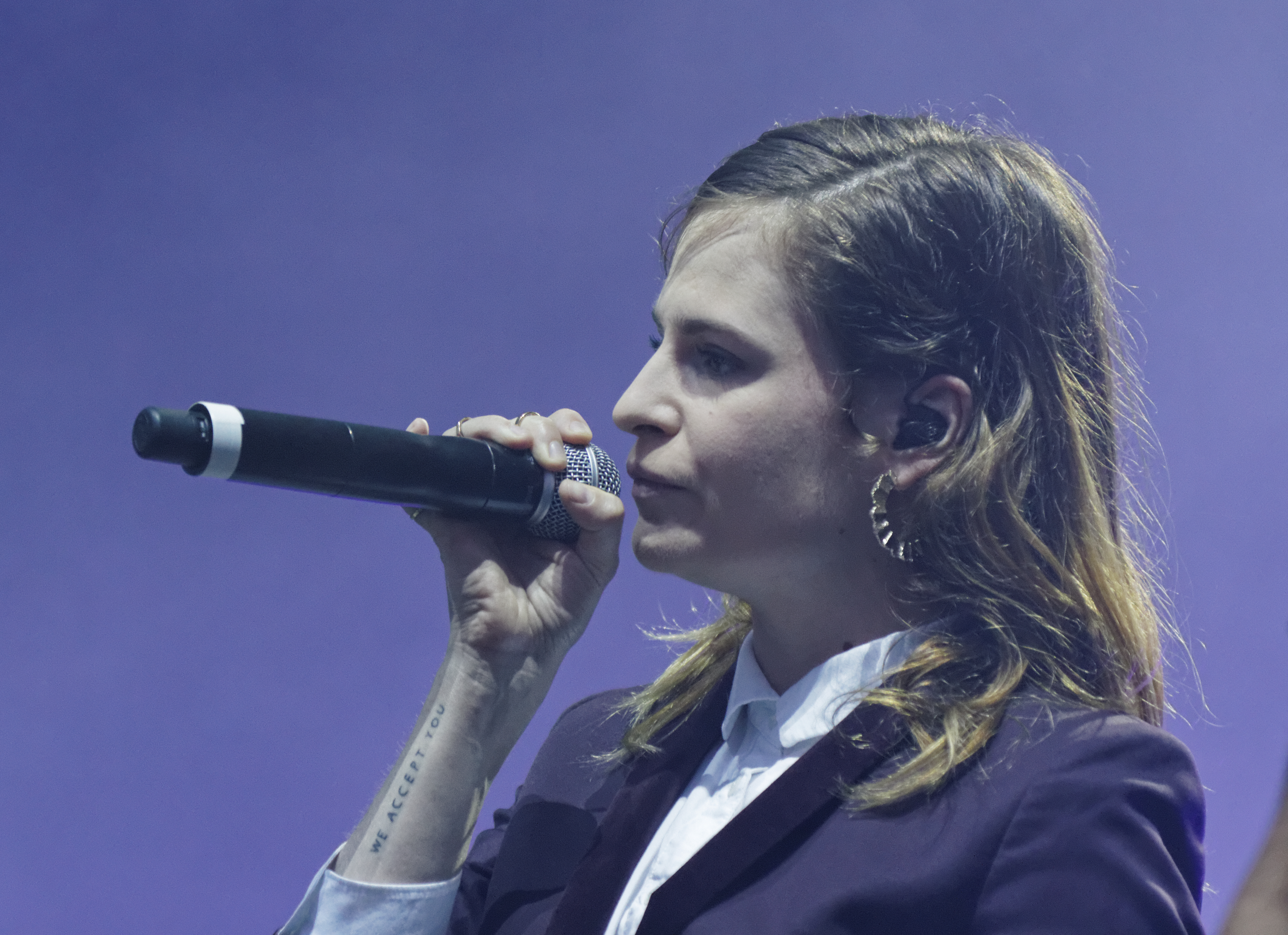
Redcar at the Vieilles Charrues Festival in 2014

Christine and the Queens' debut studio album, Chaleur humaine, was first released in France on 2 June 2014. He wrote it and co-produced with Ash Workman; the track "Paradis perdus" is a cover of a 1973 French song by Christophe. Besides "Nuit 17 à 52", three singles were released: "Saint Claude", "Christine", and "Paradis Perdus". "Christine" is the French version of "Cripple" earlier released in 2012. After the album reached number 2 on the French chart and was certified diamond there, Redcar toured France.

For the American market, the single "Tilted", English version of "Cripple"/"Christine", was released on 3 March 2015 under the Neon Gold Records label. Redcar then toured in the US for promotion with Marina and the Diamonds. Exclusively for this market, Saint Claude EP was released on 14 April, including five songs from Chaleur humaine in English versions. On 16 October, the full album, entitled Christine and the Queens, was released via Because Music. Many tracks were reworked with English lyrics and revamped beats by producer Ash Workman. Two tracks were replaced with three new songs, and two of these new songs were collaborations – "Jonathan" with Perfume Genius, and "No Harm Is Done" with rapper Tunji Ige. These two new collaborations were released as additional singles, the latter on 11 September, and the former on 16 October. On 11 November, Christine was warmly received in his first performance in large venue, the Webster Hall, New York; the next day, he appeared on The Daily Show. In 2015 top-ten lists by Time, "Tilted" was included as one of best songs of the year. Pitchfork listed the song in its 2010 best-of, "defining tracks of the decade" list at number 106. At the end of the year, he was back home, and, on 10 December, Madonna invited Christine to dance with her on stage during her concert at the Bercy Arena, Paris.

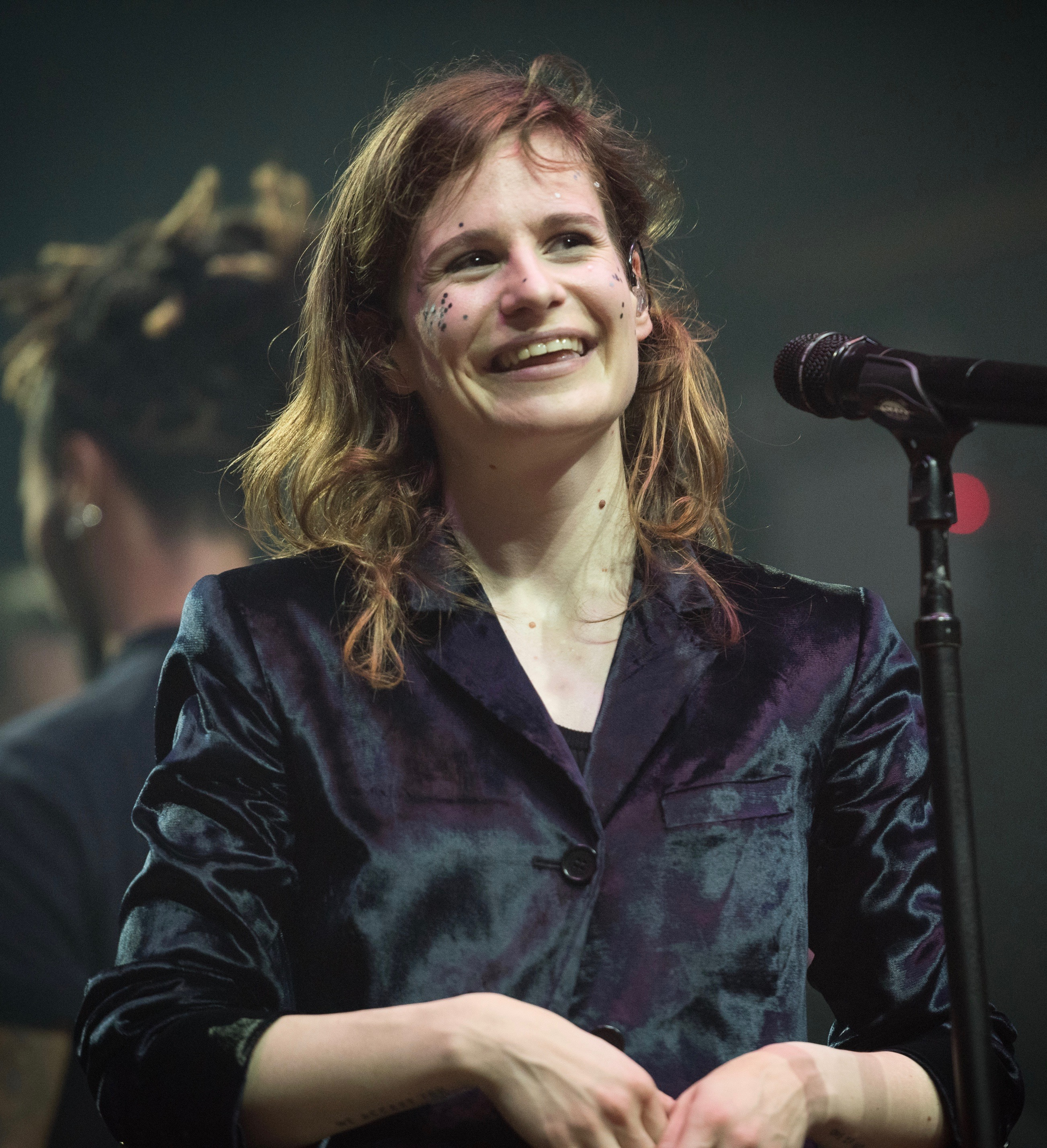
Redcar performing as Christine and the Queens in New York in 2015

In the United Kingdom, "Tilted" was released on 15 January 2016 and peaked at number 20 on the UK Singles Chart. An English version of the album was released there on 26 February, under the original French title. The record received universal critical acclaim. In April, Redcar performed for the first time, and twice, at the Coachella Festival. In May, he was added to the BBC Radio 1 main rotation playlist, and on 17 June, he appeared on The Graham Norton Show. The Guardian called his performance at the Glastonbury Festival on 24 June, the day after the Brexit vote, one of the festival's "unequivocal highlights" and later described it as "career-launching". Chaleur humaine reached number 2 on the UK Albums Chart in July and was the best selling debut studio album of 2016 there. It was featured on some year-end lists and ranked 3rd by NME and 8th by The Guardian, among other accolades. In the decade-end 'top albums of the 2010s' listings, the record was ranked No. 40 by The Independent and No. 81 by NME. In September, he put together a cover version of Beyoncé's "Sorry" in the BBC Live Lounge; for arrangement and rendition he was included in the "6 Best New Songs of the Week" list by Vulture. The same month, when he was performing at the Camden Roundhouse, Elton John sang "Tilted" with him on stage; John had earlier bought Redcar‘s French album and praised him greatly. In November, Redcar performed in London, Manchester, and Glasgow, selling 16,000 seats in a few hours each time. In October, he was chosen as one of BBC's 100 Women. He appeared twice on the Jools' Annual Hootenanny TV show, on 31 December, and on 1 January 2017. Having toured intensively during 2014–16, he stopped at the end of 2016, saying later, "I didn't want to burn out on the first [studio album]".

=== 2018–2019: Chris ===
For his second studio album, Redcar had early sessions with both Mark Ronson and Damon Albarn, but eventually decided to work alone, with Cole M.G.N. as co-producer on some tracks. "Confident in [his] decision to go it alone, [he] cut [his] hair short and started again as Chris. 'I wanted to risk it all,' [he] said, smiling." In April 2018, he announced a tour across North America and Europe, planned for the autumn. In July, Christine also announced details of an upcoming studio album titled Chris. It was preceded by the release of two singles, each in an English and French version: "Girlfriend"/"Damn, dis-moi" on 17 May, and "Doesn't Matter"/"Doesn't Matter (Voleur de soleil)" on 5 July. He also released the English-language "5 Dollars" single on 16 August, which was followed by the French-language single "La marcheuse" on 23 August. Chris was released on 21 September 2018 and received universal critical acclaim. AllMusic editors summarised: "the singer/songwriter's triumphant second album borrows from '80s R&B and questions gender roles, engaging minds, hearts, and bodies along the way." Robert Steiner of The Boston Globe called the album "a refreshing, empowering record" and complimented its "stellar production and contagiously danceable jams", as well as Redcar "engrossing lyricism". Although he felt that the album "loses steam" in its second half, Steiner named "The Walker" as a highlight for its "poignant" portrayal of a victim of domestic violence. Chris peaked at number 2 on the French and at No. 3 on the UK chart. The record featured at the top of many year-end best-of lists, ranked number one by Clash, The Guardian, and The Independent, and placed in the top-five of five other lists, for a total of 12 positions in top-ten. "Girlfriend" was named song of the year by Time. In the 'top pop albums of the 2010s' listings, Chris was ranked No. 15 by Consequence, ahead of Rihanna's Anti and Ariana Grande's Thank U, Next, and No. 24 by Paste, ahead of Lady Gaga's Born This Way and Adele's 25.

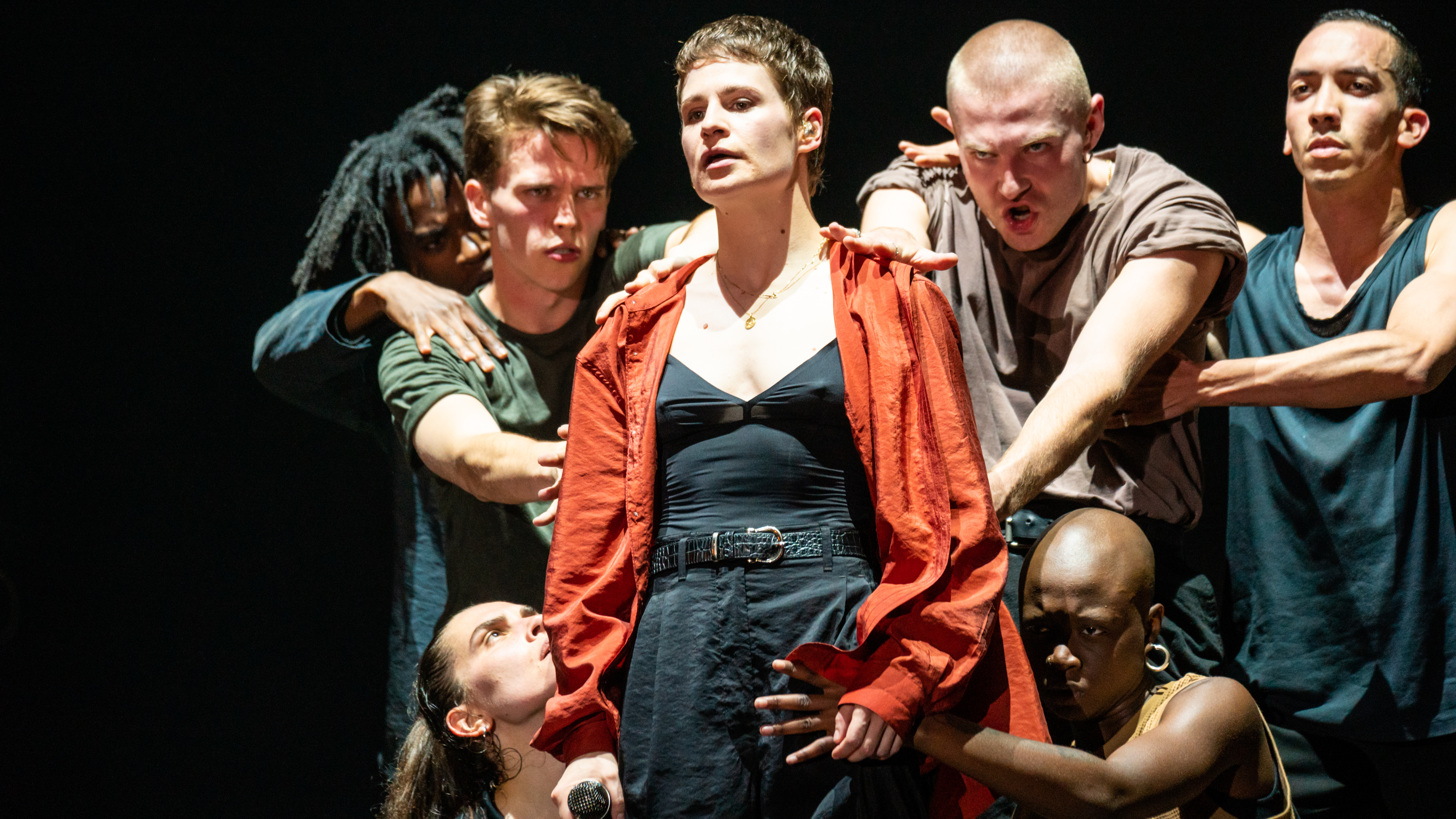
Christine and the Queens at the Primavera Sound Festival (2019)

In May 2019, Redcar performed during the season finale for the eleventh season of RuPaul's Drag Race held at the Orpheum Theatre in Los Angeles. The same month, he headlined the All Points East festival in London, marking his first UK headline festival appearance. His performance was well received; The Independent gave the concert five stars, calling it "a tiny tour de force". On 17 July, Charli XCX released the single "Gone" alongside the music video, a joint effort with Redcar, which they debuted earlier together at the end of May during the Primavera Sound festival. The track was shortlisted by BBC Radio 1 DJ Annie Mac for the Hottest Record of the Year, voted for by the public, and finished in third position. Pitchfork listed the song at number four on its list of 2019's 100 best songs and at number 145 for the 200 best songs of the 2010s. In September, the duo performed the song again at the Electric Picnic festival, on The Jonathan Ross Show to promote the release of Charli XCX's studio album Charli, and on The Tonight Show Starring Jimmy Fallon.

=== 2020–2021: La vita nuova ===
On 5 February 2020, Redcar released "People, I've Been Sad", the first single from his forthcoming extended play. La vita nuova ('The New Life'), containing five tracks and one bonus track, was released on 27 February. Again, he was the sole writer, with Ash Workman as co-producer. Redcar simultaneously released a conceptual short film directed by his longtime collaborator Colin Solal Cardo. It takes place at the famed historical Paris landmark Palais Garnier, features Redcar and a group of dancers dancing to the songs from the EP, and concludes with a guest appearance from featured artist Caroline Polachek. The EP was met with widespread critical acclaim upon its release. NME's El Hunt gave a rave review, summarizing; "conceptually, 'La Vita Nuova' is an astonishing feat – but even better than that, it also oozes an intensity of feeling that punches right in the gut." Variety called the EP "arguably [his] best work to date". "People, I've Been Sad" was recognized by Time as song of the year and also placed in the top-three of year-end critics' lists by NPR, Pitchfork, and The Guardian. The short film was included in Pitchfork's list of "The 20 Best Music Videos of 2020"; Ryan Dombal wrote: "this is art-pop cinema that's both steeped in history and gloriously unafraid to blaze its own way." Two more singles were released from La vita nuova: "I Disappear In Your Arms" on 8 June and the title track featuring Caroline Polachek on 14 August; an EP with remixes of the latter was released on 28 August. During the 2020 COVID-19 pandemic lockdown, Redcar shared a series of theatrical performances on Instagram. Also, in April, he contributed to Lady Gaga's One World: Together at Home event, and in May, he performed "People, I've Been Sad" via livestream from his Parisian home for The Late Show with Stephen Colbert. In June, Redcar performed "I Disappear In Your Arms", recorded in an empty music venue, on The Tonight Show Starring Jimmy Fallon, and then "La vita nuova", filmed inside the empty Grand Palais, on Global Citizen's Global Goal: Unite for Our Future virtual benefit concert. On 2 July 2020, he debuted "Eyes of a Child", a track created for the second season of the Amazon Prime Video series Hanna; the single had been released earlier to streaming platforms on 25 February. On 25 November, French new wave band Indochine released "3Sex" as a collaboration with Redcar, "a synth-pop dance reworking" of the band's song "3e sexe" from their studio album 3 (1985).

On 26 September 2021, Redcar released the two-track EP Joseph, containing a cover version of the George Michael song "Freedom '90", and the French classic song "Comme l'oiseau". On 4 November 2021, Charli XCX released "New Shapes" featuring Redcar and Caroline Polachek as the second single from her fifth studio album Crash (2022).

=== 2022–2023: Redcar les adorables étoiles (prologue) and Paranoia, Angels, True Love ===
Redcar first mentioned work on a third studio album in April 2020, saying that he was "looking for something very vast and hopeful" for the project. In May 2022, he collaborated with American rapper 070 Shake on "Body", a single from the latter's second studio album You Can't Kill Me. On 24 June 2022, Redcar released the lead single from his third studio album, "Je te vois enfin". The track is sung entirely in French and sees Redcar embody a "suave and sophisticated" alter ego named Redcar. His third studio album, Redcar les adorables étoiles (prologue), was released on 11 November 2022.

On 8 March 2023, Redcar released the song "To Be Honest" as the lead single from his fourth studio album Paranoia, Angels, True Love. Returning to the name Christine and the Queens for the album, he described it as "the second part of an operatic gesture that also encompassed 2022's Redcar les adorables étoiles". Primarily in English, Paranoïa, Angels, True Love was co-produced by Mike Dean. Released on 9 June 2023, it features collaborations with Madonna and 070 Shake. In 2024, Amazon licensed the song "Full of Life" from Paranoia, Angels, True Love for a 60-second ad called "Concrete Jungle". It was released in 30-second and full minute versions.

On 30 June 2023, Redcar was a guest celebrity judge in Episode 1 of Drag Race France Season 2 titled A Lé-Gen-Daire Return broadcast on France.tv Slash.

=== 2024–present: Hopecore and Catching Feelings ===
On 20 February 2024, MGMT released the single "Dancing in Babylon" featuring Christine and the Queens ahead of their fifth studio album Loss of Life. It is the first MGMT song to feature a guest vocalist. On 26 April, Redcar released the French-language song "Rentrer chez moi". It was followed by the English-language "That's Us/Wild Combination", an Arthur Russell cover, on 8 June; the song was released under the two stage names Christine and the Queens and Rahim C Redcar, the latter of which was also added to the credits of Redcar les adorables étoiles (prologue) that month.

In July 2024, Redcar, expressing frustration with both his record label and not being invited to perform during the 2024 Summer Olympics opening ceremony, leaked his fifth studio album Hopecore by sharing a WeTransfer link on his official social media accounts. He performed at the 2024 Summer Paralympics opening ceremony on 28 August, singing a remix of Édith Piaf's "Non, je ne regrette rien" near the beginning of the ceremony and a cover of Patrick Hernandez's "Born to Be Alive" near the end. Hopecore received an official release in September.

On 7 April 2025, Redcar was featured on the song "I Did Not Forget You" by French electronic duo Kompromat from their album Playing / Praying. He returned to the name Christine and the Queens for his collaborative four-track EP with French producer Cerrone, Catching Feelings. The title track was released as the lead single on 23 May 2025, with a music video directed by Redcar himself, and the EP followed on 4 July.

== Artistry ==
=== Lyrical and musical style ===
Redcar prefers lyrics that are not immediately understandable. He explained that he enjoys "authors with difficult lyrics", such as Alain Bashung. His music has been labelled by music critics as pop, synth-pop, electropop, indie pop, experimental pop, and art pop, while he described his own work as "freakpop".

=== Influences ===
Redcar emphasized the importance of his experience with Madame Jojo's drag club in London: "These drag artists have become my friends, they've inspired my creativity. They gave me the idea of creating a character, inventing another silhouette, another way of being in this world. Before it was a musical project, Christine was for me the answer to how to live properly. The Queens in Christine and the Queens is my tribute to them. Without the queens, I wouldn't be here".

He also said, "[he] does not want to choose between French music and English pop music" and takes influence from both. In a November 2013 interview with Brain Magazine, he cited artists such as Christophe, David Bowie (especially his Ziggy Stardust character), Kanye West, Kendrick Lamar, Philip Glass, T. Rex as well as the Soul Train soundtracks as his musical influences. He also named Michael Jackson as his favourite male singer and "either Patti Smith or Kate Bush" as his favourite female singer. Other influences include Björk, Beyoncé, Daniel Balavoine, Fever Ray, Frank Ocean, Janet Jackson, Jimmy Jam, Terry Lewis, Mylène Farmer, Joe Jackson, Lou Reed, Serge Gainsbourg, and Madonna.

== Personal life ==
=== Sexuality and gender ===
Redcar is pansexual. In an October 2019 interview with the magazine Attitude, he explained that he is genderqueer. Having tweeted in June 2021 that he uses all pronouns, he later told The New York Times in March 2022: "My journey with gender has always been tumultuous. It's raging right now, as I'm just exploring what is beyond this. A way to express it could be switching between they and she." In August of the same year, he stated in a TikTok video in French that his gender journey was "a long process" and explained that he had gendered himself in the masculine for about a year, which he had shared with family and close friends. He subsequently updated his pronouns to he/him across social media platforms. He has stated that he is "in resistance to the approach of trans identity that there has to be hormones and operations", which he considers a form of binarism.

=== Name ===
Redcar has used numerous personal and stage names, and remarked that he just "has many names for all the layers". He began his career as Christine and the Queens. For his second studio album, he shortened it to Chris, which was accompanied by a shift to a persona described as "a woman playing with masculine tropes". In October 2021, he was using the name Rahim, which sparked a debate around cultural appropriation due to the name's Arabic origin. He eventually began using a succession of different names such as Sam le pompier (the French title of Fireman Sam) and a full stop before settling on Redcar, sometimes shortened as Red. He still occasionally uses his birth name, about which he said: "Héloïse Letissier is my parents' provenance and I love my parents. I sometimes use Héloïse to reconnect me to my childhood, but my inner child name is Manamané."

In June 2024, he combined previous names into Rahim Claude Redcar and posted on social media that "[his] name and [his] path demand respect", expressing frustration that some of his work was credited to Christine and the Queens. Following this statement, the name Rahim C Redcar was added to streaming platforms as an additional artist alongside Christine and the Queens for the 2022 album Redcar les adorables étoiles (prologue) and the 2024 single "That's Us/Wild Combination". In September 2024, he released the single "Deep Holes" under the name Rahim Redcar. He also updated his Instagram account to reflect the name and called for people to stop deadnaming him, stating: "I don't know what problem you have to refuse to call me by my name, it's Rahim Redcar."

In January 2025, he explained during a conference at ESSEC Business School that his name changes were not "a legion of characters" as was the case with David Bowie, but rather "steps towards becoming". He stated that he sometimes thought about Christine and the Queens, but considered that identity to be part of his past and said that Rahim Redcar was the person he hoped to remain, expressing that he found the name "healing". Nevertheless, his collaborative extended play Catching Feelings with Cerrone was released in July 2025 under the name Christine and the Queens. Ahead of the EP's release, he told Le Point that "Christine and the Queens, as a project, [...] is a whole story that I don't necessarily feel like abandoning" and that he now considered it an artistic project separate from his personal identity as Rahim Redcar. He views his use of his older stage name as "rewriting the legacy of Christine and the Queens while remaining who [he has] become".

== Discography ==
- Chaleur humaine (2014)
- Chris (2018)
- Redcar les adorables étoiles (prologue) (2022)
- Paranoia, Angels, True Love (2023)
- Hopecore (as Rahim Redcar) (2024)

== See also ==
- List of French singers
- List of French singer-songwriters
