= Chris (album) =

Studio album by Christine and the Queens
- Released: 21 September 2018
- Studios: Atlas, Paris; Studio 45, London; Band House, Los Angeles; 10 Feet Under, Los Angeles
- Genres: Pop; pop-funk; electropop; R&B; dance-pop; disco funk
- Length: 44:28
- Languages: English; French
- Label: Because
- Producers: Christine and the Queens; Cole M.G.N. (Note: Vocal production; co-production on "The Walker" / "La Marcheuse", "5 Dollars" / "5 dols", "What's-Her-Face" / "Machin-chose", "Damn (What Must a Woman Do)" / "Follarse" and "Bruce est dans le brouillard")

Christine and the Queens chronology
Chaleur humaine (2014)	Chris (2018)	La vita nuova (2020)

Singles from Chris
- 1. "Girlfriend" / "Damn, dis-moi" Released: 17 May 2018; 2. "Doesn't Matter" / "Doesn't Matter (Voleur de soleil)" Released: 5 July 2018; 3. "5 Dollars" Released: 16 August 2018; 4. "La Marcheuse / The Walker" Released: 23 August 2018; 5. "Comme si" Released: 15 February 2019

Chris is the second studio album by French singer Christine and the Queens, released on 21 September 2018 in both English and French versions through Because Music. It was preceded by the release of two singles, each of which were released in both English and French versions: "Girlfriend" / "Damn, dis-moi", featuring Dâm-Funk, and "Doesn't Matter" / "Doesn't Matter (Voleur de soleil)". An English-language single, "5 Dollars", was also released alongside an S&M-inspired video, followed by the French version of "La Marcheuse".

On iTunes and other online streaming and download services, the album includes 23 tracks, with 11 in English and 12 in French, most of which are versions of the same song. The album is available physically in individual French and English versions and sets including both.

== Background ==
Although still credited to Christine and the Queens, Héloïse Letissier explained before the album's release that he had adopted the simplified moniker Chris, saying "it had to be Chris at some point because I was bolder and stronger and had more muscle [...] it was natural for me to shed the rest of the stage name and to cut my hair."

== Music and themes ==
In a track-by-track interview with Letissier, Pitchfork said the album "bounces from horny consumerism to melancholic machismo to stark vulnerability". It contrasted Chris with Letissier's debut album Chaleur humaine, saying that album's "warmth was slow-burning, [while] Chris is red hot, sweaty, and insatiable". Letissier later elaborated: "The first album was born out of the frustration of being an aberration in society, because I was a young queer woman. The second was really born out of the aberration I was becoming, which was a powerful woman—being lustful and horny and sometimes angry, and craving for this will to just own everything a bit more and apologise a bit less."

The Fader stated the album is "less starry-eyed than its predecessor", calling the lyrics more direct and sharp than before. It also claimed the album "explodes" Letissier's queer, feminist identity. Letissier named some of his references for the album were "immediate, catchy pop productions" by the likes of Cameo and Jimmy Jam and Terry Lewis, also specifically naming Michael Jackson's Dangerous and Janet Jackson's The Velvet Rope as influences. The track "Goya Soda" references the Spanish painter Francisco Goya.

== Critical reception ==
Professional ratings
Aggregate scores
Source	Rating
AnyDecentMusic?	8.3/10
Metacritic	89/100
Review scores
Source	Rating
AllMusic	4.5/5 stars
The A.V. Club	A−
The Daily Telegraph	5/5 stars
The Guardian	5/5 stars
The Independent	5/5 stars
NME	5/5 stars
The Observer	4/5 stars
Pitchfork	7.9/10
Q	4/5 stars
Rolling Stone	4/5 stars

Chris received widespread acclaim from music critics. At Metacritic, which assigns a normalised rating out of 100 to reviews from mainstream critics, the album received an average score of 89, based on 26 reviews, signifying "universal acclaim". Robert Steiner of The Boston Globe called the album a "refreshing, empowering record" and complimented its "stellar production and contagiously danceable jams", as well as Letissier's "engrossing lyricism". Although he felt that the album "loses steam" in its second half, Steiner named "The Walker" as a highlight for its "poignant" portrayal of a victim of domestic violence. In her review for AllMusic, Heather Phares concluded that "As he examines what masculinity, femininity, strength, and vulnerability mean to him, Christine has never sounded more exposed -- or in control. A triumph, Chris reaffirms just how masterfully he engages minds, hearts, and bodies."

=== Year-end lists ===
Critics' rankings of Chris
Publication	List	Rank	Ref.
AllMusic	The Allmusic 2018: Year in Review	—N/a	
Associated Press	AP's top 2018 albums	9	
Billboard	Billboard's 50 Best Albums of 2018	20	
Clash	Clash's Albums of the Year 2018	1	
Consequence of Sound	Top 50 Albums of 2018	6	
Crack	The Top 50 Albums of 2018	16	
The Daily Beast	Top 10 Albums of 2018	4	
Dazed Digital	The 20 best albums of 2018	8	
Drowned in Sound	Drowned in Sound's 15 Favourite Albums of 2018	3	
Idolator	The 25 Best Albums of 2018	2	
The Independent	The 40 best albums of 2018	1	
The Guardian	The 50 Best Albums of 2018	1	
The Line of Best Fit	The Best Albums of 2018	14	
Mojo	MOJO's Best Albums of 2018	5	
MusicOMH	Top 50 Albums Of 2018	4	
NME	NME's Albums of the Year 2018	10	
NPR Music	Best Music of 2018	21	
Pitchfork	The 50 Albums of 2018	30	
Spin	The 51 Best Albums of 2018	27	
PopMatters	The 70 Best Albums of 2018	17	
Slant Magazine	The 25 Best Albums of 2018	16	
Spectrum Culture	Top 20 Albums of 2018	18	
Spin	The 51 Best Albums of 2018	27	
USA Today	USA Today's Best Albums of 2018	—N/a	

=== Decade-end lists ===
Critics' rankings of Chris
Publication	List	Rank	Ref.
AllMusic	AllMusic's 200 Best Albums of the 2010s	—N/a	
Consequence of Sound	Top 100 of the 2010s	87	
Consequence of Sound	Top 25 Pop Albums of the 2010s	15	
Paste	The 30 Best Pop Albums of the 2010s	24	

== Track listing ==
All tracks are written by Christine and the Queens, except "Girlfriend" / "Damn, dis-moi", co-composed by Christine and the Queens and Dâm-Funk.

English version
No.	Title	Length
1.	"Comme si"	3:52
2.	"Girlfriend" (featuring Dâm-Funk)	3:20
3.	"The Walker"	4:16
4.	"Doesn't Matter"	4:24
5.	"5 Dollars"	3:28
6.	"Goya Soda"	5:25
7.	"Damn (What Must a Woman Do)"	3:37
8.	"What's-Her-Face"	5:03
9.	"Feel So Good"	3:45
10.	"Make Some Sense"	3:20
11.	"The Stranger"	4:03
Total length:		44:28

Target US bonus tracks
No.	Title	Length
12.	"Comme si on s'aimait"	3:52
13.	"Doesn't Matter (Voleur de soleil)"	4:24
14.	"5 Dols"	3:28
15.	"Bruce est dans le brouillard"	3:38
Total length:		59:49

French version
No.	Title	Length
1.	"Comme si on s'aimait"	3:52
2.	"Damn, dis-moi" (featuring Dâm-Funk)	3:20
3.	"La Marcheuse"	4:16
4.	"Doesn't Matter (Voleur de soleil)"	4:24
5.	"5 Dols"	3:28
6.	"Goya ! Soda !"	5:25
7.	"Follarse"	3:37
8.	"Machin-chose"	5:03
9.	"Bruce est dans le brouillard"	3:38
10.	"Le G"	3:55
11.	"Les Yeux mouillés"	3:20
12.	"L'Étranger (Voleur d'eau)"	4:03
Total length:		48:16

Notes

- All English and French track titles, except "Goya Soda" / "Goya ! Soda !", are stylised in sentence case capitalisation.
- The French tracks "Bruce est dans le brouillard" and "Le G" have no English counterparts, while the English track "Feel So Good" has no French counterpart.

== Personnel ==
Only English track titles listed, except for French-exclusive tracks.

Musicians

- Héloïse Letissier – arrangement, performance; drum programming (except on "What's-Her-Face"), bass (on "Comme si", "5 Dollars", "Goya Soda", "Damn (What Must a Woman Do", "What's-Her-Face", "Bruce est dans le brouillard", "Make Some Sense" and "The Stranger"), Neuron (on "Comme si", "The Walker", "Doesn't Matter", "Goya Soda", "Damn (What Must a Woman Do", "Bruce est dans le brouillard", "Feel So Good" and "Make Some Sense"), keyboards (on "5 Dollars", "Goya Soda", "Damn (What Must a Woman Do)", "What's-her-face", "Bruce est dans le brouillard", "Make Some Sense" and "The Stranger"), Emu (on "Damn (What Must a Woman Do)"), harpsichord (on "The Stranger" and "The Walker"), drums (on "What's-Her-Face"), piano (on "5 Dollars" and "What's-Her-Face"), additional synths (on "Doesn't Matter")
- Cole M.G.N. – additional arrangement (on "Damn (What Must a Woman Do)" and "The Stranger"), drum programming (except on "Comme si" and "What's-Her-Face"), bass (on "The Walker", "5 Dollars", "Damn (What Must a Woman Do)", "What's-Her-Face" and "The Stranger"), Moog (on "Comme Si"), drums (on "What's-Her-Face"), keyboards (on "The Stranger"), additional drum programming (on "Damn (What Must a Woman Do)"), additional synths (on "Doesn't Matter")
- Dâm-Funk – keytar (on "Girlfriend" and "Le G"), vocals (on "Girlfriend"), bass (on "Damn (What Must a Woman Do)"), drum programming (on "Le G")
- David Frank – keyboards (on "Girlfriend", "Goya Soda" and "Le G"), bass (on "Doesn't Matter"), piano (on "Goya Soda")
- Marlon McClain – guitars (on "Girlfriend", "Le G" and "Feel So Good")
- James Manning – bass (on "Girlfriend", "Goya Soda" and "Le G")
- Lance Tolbert – bass (on "Feel So Good")
- Daniel Aged – pedal steel (on "What's-Her-Face")
- Bastien Doremus – additional drum programming (on "Make Some Sense")

Technical

- Manny Marroquin – mixing (at Larrabee Studios)
- Chris Galland – mix engineering
- Robin Florent – mix assistance
- Scott Desmarais – mix assistance
- Felix Rémy – recording assistance (at Studio de l'Atlas)
- Michael Tainturier – recording assistance (at Studio de l'Atlas)
- Chris Steffen – recording assistance (at Band House Studios)
- David Davis – engineering (at 10 Feet Under Recording Studio)
- Chab – mastering

Artwork

- Jamie Morgan – photos
- Tracy Ma – artwork
- Laurent Antoine – design
- Auriana Beltrand – design

== Charts ==
=== Weekly charts ===
Chart (2018)	Peak position
Australian Digital Albums (ARIA)	17
Austrian Albums (Ö3 Austria)	38
Belgian Albums (Ultratop Flanders)	5
Belgian Albums (Ultratop Wallonia)	1
Canadian Albums (Billboard)	74
Dutch Albums (Album Top 100)	32
French Albums (SNEP)	2
German Albums (Offizielle Top 100)	36
Irish Albums (IRMA)	12
Scottish Albums (Official Charts)	2
Spanish Albums (Promusicae)	55
Swiss Albums (Schweizer Hitparade)	5
UK Albums (Official Charts)	3
UK Independent Albums (Official Charts)	1
US Current Albums (Billboard)	50
US Heatseekers Albums (Billboard)	1
US Top Album Sales (Billboard)	55
US Top Alternative Album Sales (Billboard)	6

=== Year-end charts ===
Chart (2018)	Position
Belgian Albums (Ultratop Flanders)	107
Belgian Albums (Ultratop Wallonia)	59
French Albums (SNEP)	68

Chart (2019)	Position
French Albums (SNEP)	164

== Certifications ==
Region	Certification	Certified units/sales
France (SNEP)	Platinum	100,000^{‡}
United Kingdom (BPI)	Silver	60,000^{‡}
^{‡} Sales+streaming figures based on certification alone.
