= Doesn't Matter (Voleur de soleil) =

Single by Christine and the Queens

from the album Chris
- Language: French; English
- English title: "Doesn't Matter (Thief of the Sun)"
- Released: 5 July 2018
- Recorded: 2018
- Genre: Dance; bubblegum pop
- Length: 4:23
- Label: Because
- Songwriter(s): Christine and the Queens
- Producer(s): Christine and the Queens

Christine and the Queens French singles chronology
"Damn, dis-moi" (2018)	"Doesn't matter (voleur de soleil)" (2018)	"La Marcheuse" (2018)

Christine and the Queens English singles chronology
"Girlfriend" (2018)	"Doesn't Matter" (2018)	"5 Dollars" (2018)

"Doesn't Matter (Voleur de soleil)", also released under the title "Doesn't Matter", is a song by French singer Christine and the Queens. "Doesn't matter (voleur de soleil)" is sung largely in French (with the exception of the chorus), whilst "Doesn't Matter" is a fully English version. Both versions were released on 5 July 2018.

== Background ==
The singer announced his second album, Chris, for release later in 2018 and a new tour for the northern hemisphere autumn. Seven weeks after he released the first single, "Damn, dis-moi / Girlfriend", he released the second single on 5 July 2018.

== Music videos ==
The videos of the two versions were released on Christine and the Queen's YouTube channel on 5 July 2018.

== Personnel ==
- Héloïse Adelaïde Letissier – drum programming, Neuron, additional synthesisers
- Cole M.G.N. – drum programming, additional synthesisers
- David Frank – bass

== Charts ==
Chart (2018)	Peak position
French Downloads (SNEP)	49

== Release history ==
Region	Date	Format	Ref.
France	5 July 2018	Digital download	
United Kingdom	5 July 2018	Digital download	
