= Damn, dis-moi =

Single by Christine and the Queens featuring Dâm-Funk

from the album Chris
- Language: Mostly French (for "Damn, dis-moi" version); Mostly English (for "Girlfriend" version)
- English title: Damn, tell me
- Released: 17 May 2018
- Recorded: 2018
- Genre: Funk; synth-pop
- Length: 3:21
- Label: Caroline; Because
- Songwriter(s): Christine and the Queens; Dâm-Funk
- Producer(s): Christine and the Queens

Christine and the Queens singles chronology
"Here" (2016)	"Damn, dis-moi" (2018)	"Doesn't matter (voleur de soleil)" (2018)

"Damn, dis-moi" (English "Damn, Tell Me"), also released under the title "Girlfriend", is a song by French singer Christine and the Queens featuring American funk musician Dâm-Funk. "Damn, dis-moi" is the French version and "Girlfriend" is the English version. Both versions were released on 17 May 2018.

The song peaked inside the top 10 of the French singles chart and was named as the best song of 2018 by Time.

The characteristic harmonic basis of the song is a loop from the GarageBand software, which is provided free of charge by Apple. The use of the sample was documented acoustically by Dr. Pop in the podcast ‘Auf Knopfdruck zum Welthit’.

== Background ==
Letissier announced a new tour planned for autumn 2018 and a new album, Chris.

== Commercial performance ==
=== "Damn, dis-moi" ===
"Damn, dis-moi" started at number 69 on the French Singles Chart (Downloads + Streaming) with 3,701 units, but entered at number 7 on the Sales Singles Chart (physical sales and downloads).

The single did not enter the Swiss national charts, but peaked at number 15 in Romandy.

=== "Girlfriend" ===
"Girlfriend" did not enter the French Singles Chart, but peaked at number 27 on the Sales Singles Chart and at number 26 on the Downloads Singles Chart.

The single entered at number 95 on the UK Singles Chart. It entered at number 76 on the Scottish Singles Chart.

=== "Damn, dis-moi" + "Girlfriend" ===
The Belgian Web site Ultratop.be indicates "Damn, dis-moi" + "Girlfriend" on both the Flemish and Wallonian charts until 15 June 2018. During the first week, the single did not enter on both ultratop 50 charts, but peaked at number 22 on Wallonian Ultratip chart and at number 15 on Flemish Ultratip chart. The second week, it entered on both Ultratop 50 charts and peaked at number 21 on the Flemish chart and at number 45 on the Wallonian chart. It later reached number 13 in Wallonia, then number 10.

== Music videos ==
The audio videos of two versions (French and English) were released in YouTube Christine and the Queens channel on 17 May 2018. On the picture, there is a new name "Chris", stylised as "CHRIS~~TINE AND THE QUEENS~~". He also changed the title of his website. On 24 May 2018, both versions of the official video were released on his website.

== Live performances ==
During BBC Radio 1's Big Weekend 2018 in Swansea, he sang several songs from his discography, including "Girlfriend". On 5 June 2018, Letissier again interpreted his song in the United Kingdom, during Later... with Jools Holland on the television channel BBC 2. On 8 June 2018, the singer participated in La Chanson de l'année 2018 (Song of the Year 2018) at the Arena of Nîmes, which was broadcast on the French television channel TF1. He sang the French version of the single, "Damn, dis-moi".

== Reception ==
The song was acclaimed by music critics and was named as the best song of 2018 by Time. The magazine wrote:

Flexing lyrically over a Michael Jackson–inspired beat, Letissier wrestles with, and ultimately rejects, gender norms. In the process, [he] proves that pop’s boundaries can be just as fluid as identity—if only we are bold enough to assert ourselves as [he] does.

== Track listing ==
- Digital download – Damn, dis-moi
1. "Damn, dis-moi" (French version) — 3:21
2. "Girlfriend" (English version) — 3:21
- Digital download – Girlfriend
1. "Girlfriend" (English version) — 3:21
- Digital download – Girlfriend / Damn, dis-moi (Remixes)
1. Girlfriend" (Gerd Janson's Balearic Remix Edit Version) — 3:44
2. "Damn, dis-moi" (Gerd Janson's Balearic Remix Edit Version) — 3:44
3. "Girlfriend" (Palms Trax Remix) — 5:25
4. "Damn, dis-moi" (Palms Trax Remix) — 5:25
5. "Girlfriend" (Dâm-Funk Re-Freak) — 7:28
6. "Girlfriend" (Jam City Remix) —3:17
7. "Girlfriend" (GODMODE Remix) — 4:28

== Personnel ==
- Chris – vocals, drum programming
- Cole M.G.N. – drum programming
- James Manning – bass
- Marlon McClain – guitars
- David Frank – keyboards
- Dâm-Funk – vocals, keytar

== Charts ==
=== "Damn, dis-moi" + "Girlfriend" ===
Weekly charts

Chart (2018)	Peak position
Belgium (Ultratop 50 Flanders)	21
Belgium (Ultratop 50 Wallonia)	7

Year-end charts

Chart (2018)	Peak position
Belgium (Ultratop Wallonia)	44

=== "Damn, dis-moi" ===
Chart (2018)	Peak position
French Streaming (SNEP)	82
French Airplay (SNEP)	8
French Downloads (SNEP)	7
French Singles Sales (physical + downloads) (SNEP)	7
French Singles (downloads + streaming) (SNEP)	61
Switzerland (Media Control Romandy)	15

=== "Girlfriend" ===
Chart (2018)	Peak position
French Downloads (SNEP)	26
French Sales Singles (SNEP)	27
Scotland (OCC)	31
UK Singles (OCC)	85
UK Indie (OCC)	18

== Certifications ==
Region	Certification	Certified units/sales
France (SNEP)	Gold	100,000^{‡}
^{‡} Sales+streaming figures based on certification alone.

== Release history ==
Region	Date	Format	Labels	Ref.
France	17 May 2018	Digital download	Caroline, Because	
United Kingdom	17 May 2018	Digital download	Caroline, Because	
United States	17 May 2018	Digital download	Caroline, Because	
