= Grammy Award for Best Engineered Album, Non-Classical =

Music industry award

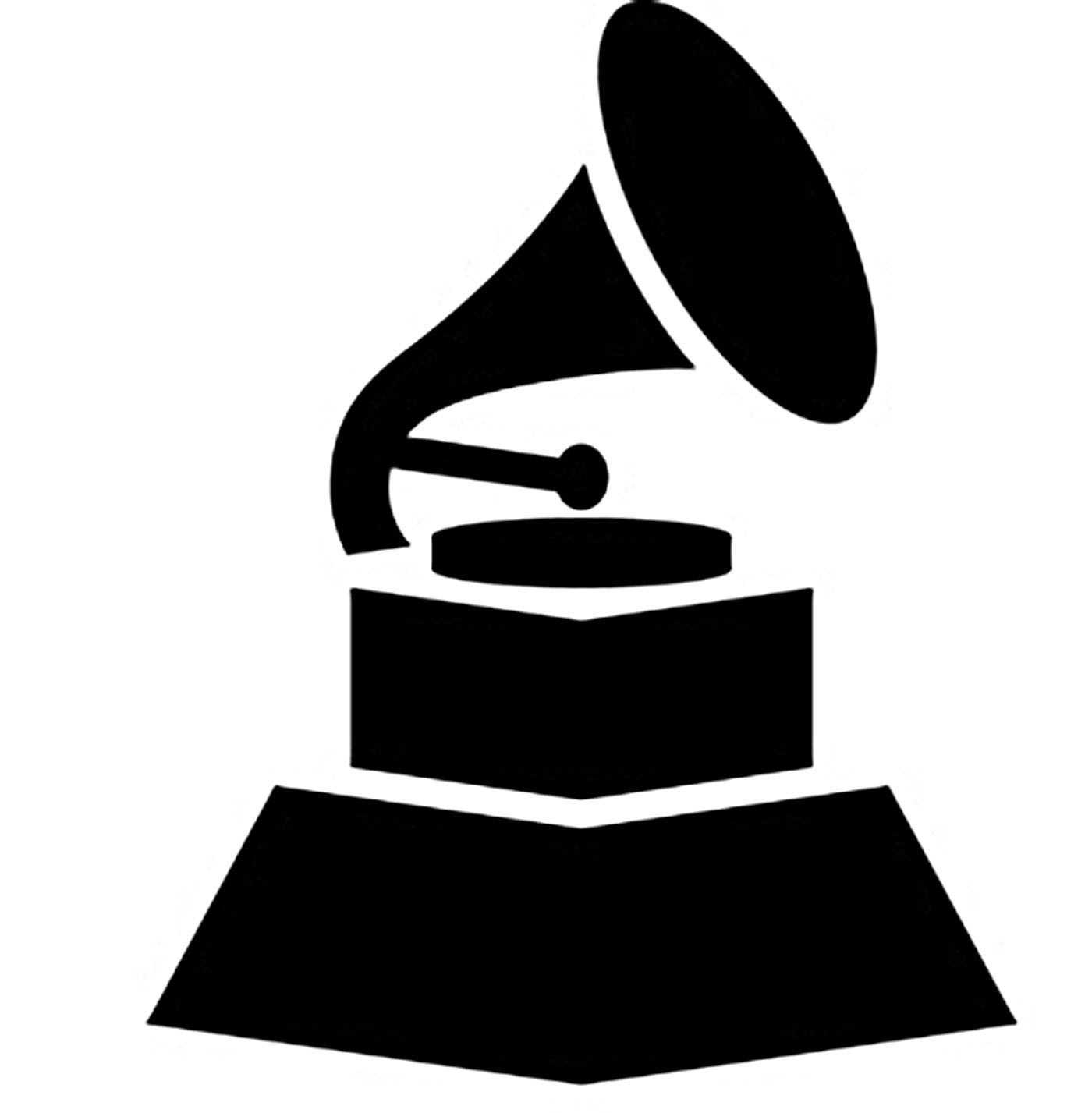
- Gilded gramophone trophy presented to Grammy Award winners
- Awarded for: Quality engineering for a non-classical album
- Country: United States
- Presented by: National Academy of Recording Arts and Sciences
- First award: 1959
- Currently held by: That Wasn't a Dream (2026)
- Website: grammy.com

The Grammy Award for Best Engineered Album, Non-Classical has been awarded since 1959. The award had several minor name changes:

- In 1959, the award was known as Best Engineered Record – Non-Classical
- In 1960, it was awarded as Best Engineering Contribution – Other Than Classical or Novelty
- From 1961 to 1962, it was awarded as Best Engineering Contribution – Popular Recording
- In 1963, it was awarded as Best Engineering Contribution – Other Than Novelty and Other Than Classical
- In 1964, it was awarded as Best Engineered Recording – Other Than Classical
- From 1965 to 1991, it returned to the title Best Engineered Recording – Non-Classical
- Since 1992, it has been awarded as Best Engineered Album, Non-Classical

This award is presented alongside the Grammy Award for Best Engineered Album, Classical. From 1960 to 1965 a further award was presented for Best Engineered Recording – Special or Novel Effects.

Years reflect the year in which the Grammy Awards were presented, for works released in the previous year. The award is presented to the audio engineer(s) (and, since 2012, also to the mastering engineer[s]) on the winning work, not to the artist or performer, except if the artist is also a credited engineer.

== Winners and nominees ==
=== 1950s ===
Year^{[I]}	Work	Recipient(s)	Artist(s)
1959 (May)	"The Chipmunk Song"	Ted Keep, engineer	David Seville
1959 (May)	Billy May's Big Fat Brass	Hugh Davies, engineer	Billy May
1959 (May)	Come Fly with Me	Luis P. Valentin, engineer	Frank Sinatra
1959 (May)	Other Worlds, Other Sounds	Rafael O. Valentin, engineer	Esquivel
1959 (May)	"Witchcraft"	Marvin Schwartz, engineer	Frank Sinatra
1959 (November)	Belafonte at Carnegie Hall	Robert Simpson, engineer	Harry Belafonte
1959 (November)	Big Band Guitar	Robert Simpson, engineer	Buddy Morrow
1959 (November)	Compulsion to Swing	Robert Simpson, engineer	Henri René
1959 (November)	New Sounds at the Roosevelt	Robert Simpson, engineer	Larry Elgart
1959 (November)	Strings Aflame	Ernest Oelrich, engineer	Esquivel

=== 1960s ===
Year^{[I]}	Work	Recipient(s)	Artist(s)
1961	Ella Fitzgerald Sings the George and Ira Gershwin Songbook	Luis P. Valentin, engineer	Ella Fitzgerald
1961	Belafonte Returns to Carnegie Hall	Robert Simpson, engineer	Harry Belafonte
1961	Infinity in Sound	John Norman, engineer	Esquivel
1961	Louis Bellson Swings Jule Styne	Luis P. Valentin, engineer	Louis Bellson
1961	Persuasive Percussion No. 2	Robert Fine, engineer	Enoch Light
1961	Wild Is Love	John Kraus, engineer	Nat King Cole
1961	Wild Percussion and Horns A'Plenty	Robert Simpson, engineer	Dick Schory
1962	Judy at Carnegie Hall	Robert Arnold, engineer	Judy Garland
1962	Breakfast at Tiffany's: Music from the Motion Picture	Al Schmitt, engineer	Henry Mancini
1962	Cozy	Bill MacMeekin, engineer	Steve Lawrence and Eydie Gormé
1962	Great Band with Great Voices	Al Schmitt, engineer	The Johnny Mann Singers
1962	Stereo 35/MM	Robert Fine, engineer	Enoch Light
1963	Hatari! (Original Motion Picture Soundtrack)	Al Schmitt, engineer	Henry Mancini
1963	Adventures in Jazz	Carson C. Taylor, engineer	Stan Kenton
1963	Great Band with Great Voices Swing the Great Voices of the Great Bands	Al Schmitt, engineer	Si Zentner Orchestra and The Johnny Mann Singers
1963	"I Can't Stop Loving You"	Bill Putnam, engineer	Ray Charles
1963	Jonah Jones and Glen Gray	Hugh Davies, engineer	Jonah Jones and Glen Gray
1963	"Route 66 Theme"	John Kraus, engineer	Nelson Riddle
1963	Stereo Spectacular	William Hamilton, engineer	Various Artists
1964	Charade (Original Motion Picture Soundtrack)	James Malloy, engineer	Henry Mancini
1964	The Barbra Streisand Album	Frank Laico, engineer	Barbra Streisand
1964	Ella and Basie!	Luis P. Valentin, engineer	Ella Fitzgerald and Count Basie
1964	Exotic Sounds of Bali	Harold Chapman, engineer	Mantle Hood
1964	The Many Moods of Christmas	Anthony J. Salvatore, engineers	Robert Shaw Chorale
1964	Our Man in Hollywood	Al Schmitt, engineer	Henry Mancini
1964	Politely Percussive	Ronald A. Steele, engineer	Dick Schory
1964	The Second Barbra Streisand Album	Frank Laico, engineer	Barbra Streisand
1964	Supercussion	Ronald A. Steele, engineer	Dick Schory
1965	Getz/Gilberto	Phil Ramone, engineer	Stan Getz and João Gilberto
1965	Artistry in Voices and Brass	John Kraus, engineer	Stan Kenton
1965	The Pink Panther (Original Motion Picture Soundtrack)	James Malloy, engineer	Henry Mancini
1965	"Pops" Goes the Trumpet	Bernie Keville, engineers	Al Hirt, Arthur Fiedler and Boston Pops Orchestra
1965	Sugar Lips	Chuck Seitz, engineer	Al Hirt
1965	Who Can I Turn To	George Kneurr and Frank Laico, engineers	Tony Bennett
1966	"A Taste of Honey"	Larry Levine, engineer	Herb Alpert and the Tijuana Brass
1966	The Latin Sound of Henry Mancini	Dick Bogert, engineer	Henry Mancini
1966	More of That Guitar Country	Al Pachucki and Chuck Seitz, engineers	Chet Atkins
1966	My Name Is Barbra	Frank Laico, engineer	Barbra Streisand
1966	September of My Years	Lowell Frank, engineer	Frank Sinatra
1966	That Honey Horn Sound	Chuck Seitz and William Vandevort, engineers	Al Hirt
1967	Strangers in the Night	Eddie Brackett and Lee Herschberg, engineers	Frank Sinatra
1967	Arabesque (Original Motion Picture Soundtrack)	Dick Bogert, engineer	Henry Mancini
1967	The Last Word in Lonesome	James Malloy, engineer	Eddy Arnold
1967	Presenting Joe Williams and Thad Jones/Mel Lewis, the Jazz Orchestra	Phil Ramone, engineer	Joe Williams and The Thad Jones/Mel Lewis Orchestra
1967	Presenting Thad Jones/Mel Lewis and the Jazz Orchestra	Phil Ramone, engineer	The Thad Jones/Mel Lewis Orchestra
1968	Sgt. Pepper's Lonely Hearts Club Band	Geoff Emerick, engineer	The Beatles
1968	Chet's Tune	William Vandevort, engineer	Some of Chet's Friends
1968	How Great Thou Art	James Malloy, engineer	Elvis Presley
1968	Music from Mission: Impossible	Hank Cicalo, engineer	Lalo Schifrin
1968	Ode to Billie Joe	Joe Polito, engineer	Bobbie Gentry
1969	Wichita Lineman	Hugh Davies and Joe Polito, engineers	Glen Campbell
1969	Daktari	Dave Wiechman, engineer	Shelly Manne
1969	The Good, the Bad and the Ugly	Richard Bogert, engineer	Hugo Montenegro
1969	Man of La Mancha (Original London Cast Recording)	Jerry Boys and Peter Vince, engineers	Various Artists
1969	Rotary Connection	Doug Brand, engineer	Rotary Connection

=== 1970s ===
Year^{[I]}	Work	Recipient(s)	Artist(s)
1970	Abbey Road	Geoff Emerick and Phil McDonald, engineers	The Beatles
1970	The Age of Aquarius	Bones Howe, engineers	The 5th Dimension
1970	Blood, Sweat & Tears	Roy Halee, engineer	Blood, Sweat & Tears
1970	Moog Groove	Doug Brand, Chuck Lishon, Bruce Swedien and Hans Wurman, engineers	Electronic Concept Orchestra
1970	Velvet Voices and Bold Brass	Chuck Britz, Larry Cox and Lee Herschberg, engineers	Anita Kerr Quartet
1971	Bridge Over Troubled Water	Roy Halee, engineer	Simon & Garfunkel
1971	Close to You	Dick Bogert and Ray Gerhardt, engineers	The Carpenters
1971	The Kaempfert Touch	Peter Klemt, engineer	Bert Kaempfert and Orchestra
1971	Tap Root Manuscript	Armin Steiner, engineer	Neil Diamond
1971	To Our Children's Children's Children	Adrian Martins, Robin Thompson and Derek Vernals, engineers	The Moody Blues
1972	"Theme from Shaft"	Henry Bush, Ron Capone and Dave Purple, engineers	Isaac Hayes
1972	Carpenters	Dick Bogert and Ray Gerhardt, engineers	The Carpenters
1972	The 5th Dimension Live!	Bones Howe, engineer	The 5th Dimension
1972	Stones	Armin Steiner, engineer	Neil Diamond
1972	Wings	Larry Levine and Roger Roche, engineers	Michel Colombier
1973	Moods	Armin Steiner, engineer	Neil Diamond
1973	Baby I'm-a Want You	Armin Steiner, engineer	Bread
1973	Fragile	Eddy Offord, engineer	Yes
1973	Honky Château	Ken Scott, engineer	Elton John
1973	Son of Schmilsson	Robin Geoffrey Cable, Ken Scott and Phil McDonald, engineers	Harry Nilsson
1974	Innervisions	Malcolm Cecil and Robert Margouleff, engineers	Stevie Wonder
1974	The Dark Side of the Moon	Alan Parsons, engineer	Pink Floyd
1974	Goodbye Yellow Brick Road	David Hentschel, engineer	Elton John
1974	"Long Train Runnin'"	Donn Landee, engineer	The Doobie Brothers
1974	No Secrets	Robin Geoffrey Cable and Bill Schnee, engineers	Carly Simon
1975	Band on the Run	Geoff Emerick, engineer	Paul McCartney and Wings
1975	Crime of the Century	John Jansen and Ken Scott, engineers	Supertramp
1975	Lincoln Mayorga and Distinguished Colleagues, Vol. 3	Bill Schnee, engineer	Lincoln Mayorga
1975	Powerful People	Larry Forkner and Tommy Vicari, engineers	Gino Vannelli
1975	Southern Comfort	Peter Granet and Rik Pekkonen, engineers	The Crusaders
1976	Between the Lines	Brooks Arthur, Larry Alexander and Russ Payne, engineers	Janis Ian
1976	Ambrosia	Chuck Johnson, Alan Parsons, Freddie Piro, Billy Taylor and Tom Trefethen, engineers	Ambrosia
1976	I've Got the Music in Me	Bill Schnee, engineer	Thelma Houston and Pressure Cooker
1976	The Original Soundtrack	Eric Stewart, engineer	10cc
1976	Storm at Sunup	Tommy Vicari, engineer	Gino Vannelli
1977	Breezin'	Al Schmitt, engineer	George Benson
1977	The Dream Weaver	Jay Lewis, engineer	Gary Wright
1977	The King James Version	Ron Hitchcock, engineer	Harry James
1977	Somewhere I've Never Travelled	Alan Parsons and Tom Trefethen, engineers	Ambrosia
1977	Tales of Mystery and Imagination	Alan Parsons, engineer	The Alan Parsons Project
1978	Aja	Roger Nichols, Elliot Scheiner, Al Schmitt and Bill Schnee, engineers	Steely Dan
1978	Discovered Again!	Bill Schnee, engineer	Dave Grusin
1978	JT	Val Garay, engineer	James Taylor
1978	Rumours	Ken Caillat and Richard Dashut, engineers	Fleetwood Mac
1978	Simple Dreams	Val Garay, engineer	Linda Ronstadt
1979	"FM (No Static at All)"	Roger Nichols and Al Schmitt, engineers	Steely Dan
1979	All 'n All	George Massenburg, engineer	Earth, Wind & Fire
1979	Close Encounters of the Third Kind	John Neal, engineer	John Williams
1979	Pyramid	Alan Parsons, engineer	The Alan Parsons Project
1979	Sounds...and Stuff Like That!!	Bruce Swedien, engineer	Quincy Jones
1979	A Tribute to Ethel Waters	Alan Sides and John Neal, engineers	Diahann Carroll

=== 1980s ===
Year^{[I]}	Work	Recipient(s)	Artist(s)
1980	Breakfast in America	Peter Henderson, engineer	Supertramp
1980	Cornerstone	Rob Kingsland and Gary Loizzo, engineers	Styx
1980	Eve	Alan Parsons, engineer	The Alan Parsons Project
1980	Just Friends	Phil Edwards, engineer	L.A. 4
1980	Rickie Lee Jones	Tom Knox, engineer	Rickie Lee Jones
1981	The Wall	James Guthrie, engineer	Pink Floyd
1981	Christopher Cross	Chet Himes, engineer	Christopher Cross
1981	Give Me the Night	Bruce Swedien, engineer	George Benson
1981	Growing Up in Hollywood Town	Bill Schnee, engineer	Lincoln Mayorga and Amanda McBroom
1981	New Baby	Bill Schnee, engineer	Don Randi and Quest
1982	Gaucho	Jerry Garszva, Roger Nichols, Elliot Scheiner and Bill Schnee, engineers	Steely Dan
1982	The Dude	Bruce Swedien, engineer	Quincy Jones
1982	Escape	Kevin Elson and Mike Stone, engineers	Journey
1982	The Turn of a Friendly Card	Alan Parsons, engineer	The Alan Parsons Project
1982	Zenyatta Mondatta	Nigel Gray, engineer	The Police
1983	Toto IV	Tom Knox, Greg Ladanyi, David Leonard and Al Schmitt, engineers	Toto
1983	American Fool	Don Gehman, Mark Stebbeds and George Tutko, engineers	John Cougar
1983	Eye in the Sky	Alan Parsons, engineer	The Alan Parsons Project
1983	Love over Gold	Neil Dorfsman, engineer	Dire Straits
1983	The Nightfly	Roger Nichols, engineer	Donald Fagen
1984	Thriller	Bruce Swedien, engineer	Michael Jackson
1984	Bossa Nova Hotel	Peter Chaiken, James Gallagher, Tommy Vicari and Thom Wilson, engineers	Michael Sembello
1984	Jarreau	Ian Eales, Jay Graydon and Eric Prestis, engineers	Al Jarreau
1984	Kilroy Was Here	Rob Kingsland, Gary Loizzo and Will Rascati, engineer	Styx
1984	Target	Alan Sides, engineer	Tom Scott
1985	Chicago 17	Humberto Gatica, engineer	Chicago
1985	Aerial Boundaries	Steven Miller, engineer	Michael Hedges
1985	Can't Slow Down	Calvin Harris, engineer	Lionel Richie
1985	Heartbeat City	Nigel Green, engineer	The Cars
1985	Into the Gap	Phil Thornalley, engineer	Thompson Twins
1986	Brothers in Arms	Neil Dorfsman, engineer	Dire Straits
1986	Crazy from the Heat	Jeff Hendrickson, engineer	David Lee Roth
1986	The Dream of the Blue Turtles	Jim Scott and Pete Smith, engineers	Sting
1986	Harlequin	Don Murray, engineer	Dave Grusin and Lee Ritenour
1986	Modern Manners	Paul Wickliffe and Chieli Minucci, engineers	Special EFX
1987	Back in the High Life	Jason Corsaro and Tom Lord-Alge, engineers	Steve Winwood
1987	David Foster	Humberto Gatica, engineer	David Foster
1987	Dog Eat Dog	Mike Shipley, engineer	Joni Mitchell
1987	GRP Live in Session	Don Murray, engineer	Various Artists
1987	Riptide	Jason Corsaro and Eric "ET" Thorngren, engineers	Robert Palmer
1988	Bad	Bruce Swedien and Humberto Gatica, engineers	Michael Jackson
1988	Cinemagic	Don Murray and Keith Grant, engineers; Josiah Gluck and Dave Grusin, mixers	Dave Grusin
1988	Heart & Soul	Joe Bogen, Ben Harris and Kyle Lehning, engineers	Ronnie Milsap
1988	A Momentary Lapse of Reason	Andy Jackson, engineer	Pink Floyd
1988	Neon	Ray Bardani and John Potoker, engineers	Flim & the BB's
1988	Reflections	Al Schmitt, engineer	Bill Watrous
1989	Roll with It	Tom Lord-Alge, engineer	Steve Winwood
1989	Facets	Mick Guzauski, engineer	Doc Severinsen
1989	Let It Roll	George Massenburg, engineer	Little Feat
1989	Provision	Ray Bardani and John Potoker, engineers	Scritti Politti
1989	Soul Searchin'	Elliot Scheiner, engineer	Glenn Frey
1989	Through the Lens	John Archer, engineer	Checkfield

=== 1990s ===
Year^{[I]}	Work	Recipient(s)	Artist(s)
1990	Cry Like a Rainstorm, Howl Like the Wind	George Massenburg, engineer	Linda Ronstadt
1990	Flowers in the Dirt	Neil Dorfsman, engineer	Paul McCartney
1990	Full Moon Fever	Mike Campbell, Don Smith and Bill Bottrell, engineers	Tom Petty
1990	Happy Anniversary, Charlie Brown	Josiah Gluck, engineer	Various Artists
1990	Like a Prayer	Bill Bottrell, engineer	Madonna
1990	Migration	Don Murray and Ed Rak, engineers	Dave Grusin
1991	Back on the Block	Bruce Swedien, engineer	Quincy Jones
1991	Bedtime Stories	Steve Churchyard and Dan Marnien, engineers	David Baerwald
1991	...But Seriously	Hugh Padgham, engineer	Phil Collins
1991	Holdin' a Good Hand	Scott Hendricks, engineer	Lee Greenwood
1991	Love Is Gonna Getcha	Don Murray, engineer	Patti Austin
1992	Unforgettable... with Love	Al Schmitt, Armin Steiner and Woody Woodruff, engineers	Natalie Cole
1992	Havana (Original Motion Picture Soundtrack)	Don Murray, engineer	Dave Grusin
1992	Luck of the Draw	Ed Cherney, engineer	Bonnie Raitt
1992	Storyville	Steve Nye, engineer	Robbie Robertson
1992	Warm Your Heart	George Massenburg, engineer	Aaron Neville
1993	Dangerous	Bruce Swedien and Teddy Riley, engineers	Michael Jackson
1993	Brasileiro	Moogie Canazio, engineer	Sérgio Mendes
1993	The Hunter	Elliot Scheiner and Walter New, engineers	Jennifer Warnes
1993	Ingénue	Greg Penny and Marc Ramaer, engineers	k.d. lang
1993	Out of the Cradle	Lindsey Buckingham, Richard Dashut, Kevin Killen, Greg Droman and Chris Lord-Alge, engineers	Lindsey Buckingham
1994	Ten Summoner's Tales	Hugh Padgham, engineer	Sting
1994	Janet	Steve Hodge and Dave Rideau, engineer	Janet Jackson
1994	Lam Toro	Cesar Sogbe and Joe Galdo, engineers	Baaba Maal
1994	Rage Against the Machine	Andy Wallace, Stan Katayama and Garth Richardson, engineers	Rage Against the Machine
1994	Wes Bound	Don Murray, engineer	Lee Ritenour
1995	Longing in Their Hearts	Ed Cherney, engineer	Bonnie Raitt
1995	The Division Bell	Andy Jackson, engineer	Pink Floyd
1995	I'm Alive	Ed Cherney, Paul Dieter and Rik Pekkonen, engineers	Jackson Browne
1995	Rhythm, Country and Blues	Chuck Ainlay, Ed Cherney, Roger Nichols, Rik Pekkonen, Don Smith and Bob Clearmountain, engineers	Various Artists
1995	Seal	Robin Barclay, Sean Chenery, Steve Fitzmaurice, Gregg Jackman, Steve MacMillin, Carmen Rizzo, Tim Weidner and Paul Wright, engineers	Seal
1996	Wildflowers	Dave Bianco, Richard Dodd, Stephen McLaughlin and Jim Scott, engineers	Tom Petty
1996	Afterglow	Al Schmitt, engineer	Dr. John
1996	Astro-Creep: 2000	Terry Date and Ulrich Wild, engineers	White Zombie
1996	Hell Freezes Over	Rob Jacobs and Elliot Scheiner, engineers	Eagles
1996	HIStory: Past, Present and Future, Book I	Bruce Swedien, engineer	Michael Jackson
1997	Q's Jook Joint	Francis Buckley, Al Schmitt, Bruce Swedien and Tommy Vicari, engineers	Quincy Jones and Various Artists
1997	Oceano	Moogie Canazio, engineer	Sérgio Mendes
1997	Peace Beyond Passion	Michael Krowiak, Bob Power and Rail Jon Rogut, engineers	Meshell Ndegeocello
1997	Stardust	Dave Reitzas, Elliot Scheiner, Al Schmitt and Erik Zobler, engineers	Natalie Cole
1997	Tambu	Elliot Scheiner, Al Schmitt and Bill Smith, engineers	Toto
1998	Hourglass	Frank Filipetti, engineer	James Taylor
1998	Blue Moon Swamp	Bob Clearmountain and John Lowson, engineers	John Fogerty
1998	The Day	"Bassy" Bob Brockmann, Jon Gass, Humberto Gatica, Brad Gilderman, Mick Guzauski, Thom Russo and Mike Scott, engineers	Babyface
1998	Dream Walkin'	John Guess and Julian King, engineers	Toby Keith
1998	Two for the Road	Elliot Scheiner and Al Schmitt, engineers	Dave Grusin
1999	The Globe Sessions	Andy Wallace, Tchad Blake and Trina Shoemaker, engineers	Sheryl Crow
1999	Breath of Heaven	Al Schmitt, engineer	Vince Gill
1999	Contact from the Underworld of Redboy	Howie B, Andy Bradfield, Jamie Cerniglia, Marius de Vries, Chris Fogel, Tim Gordine, Troy Matthews, Pat McCarthy, Dane Ngahuka, Randall Prescott, Carmen Rizzo, Tim Stroh and Jim Wilson, engineers	Robbie Robertson
1999	Firecracker	Bob Clearmountain and Juan Patino, engineers	Lisa Loeb
1999	The Nu Nation Project	Gerald Baillergeau, Chris Bell, Kevin Bond, "Bassy" Bob Brockmann, Mick Guzauski, Fred Hammond, Ray Hammond, Tim Kimsey, Victor "Vinno" Merritt and Mark Williams, engineers	Kirk Franklin

=== 2000s ===
Year^{[I]}	Work	Recipient(s)	Artist(s)
2000	When I Look in Your Eyes	Al Schmitt, engineer	Diana Krall
2000	Forget About It	Gary Paczosa, engineer	Alison Krauss
2000	Mindfields	Steve MacMillan, Elliot Scheiner, Al Schmitt and Jess Sutcliffe, engineers	Toto
2000	My Heart	Joe Chiccarelli, Mick Guzauski and John Kelton, engineers	Lorrie Morgan
2000	Owsley	Jeff Balding, Tom Lord-Alge, J.R. McNeeley, Owsley, Millard Powers and Shane Wilson, engineers	Owsley
2001	Two Against Nature	Phil Burnett, Roger Nichols, Dave Russell and Elliot Scheiner, engineers	Steely Dan
2001	Absolute Benson	Steve Barkan, Jon Fausty, Al Schmitt and Bill Schnee, engineers	George Benson
2001	Here's to You, Charlie Brown: 50 Great Years!	Clark Germain and Bill Schnee, engineers	David Benoit
2001	Kid A	Nigel Godrich, engineer	Radiohead
2001	Oregon in Moscow	Rich Breen, engineer	Oregon and Moscow Tchaikovsky Symphony Orchestra
2002	The Look of Love	Al Schmitt, engineer	Diana Krall
2002	Ballads: Remembering John Coltrane	Josiah Gluck, engineer	Karrin Allyson
2002	Life on a String	Martin Brumbach, engineer	Laurie Anderson
2002	New Favorite	Gary Paczosa, engineer	Alison Krauss & Union Station
2002	Time* Sex* Love*	George Massenburg, engineer	Mary Chapin Carpenter
2003	Come Away with Me	S. Husky Höskulds, Arif Mardin and Jay Newland, engineers	Norah Jones
2003	Ask a Woman Who Knows	Elliot Scheiner and Al Schmitt, engineers	Natalie Cole
2003	C'mon, C'mon	Trina Shoemaker and Eric Tew, engineers	Sheryl Crow
2003	Home	Gary Paczosa, engineer	Dixie Chicks
2003	Morning View	Mike Einziger, Dave Holdredge, Scott Litt and Rick Will, engineers	Incubus
2004	Hail to the Thief	Nigel Godrich and Darrell Thorp, engineers	Radiohead
2004	Elephunk	Will Adams, Dylan Dresdow, Jun Ishizeki, Chris Lord-Alge, Tony Maserati, Jason Villaroman, Tal Herzberg and Frank Wolf, engineers	The Black Eyed Peas
2004	Natural Selection	Michael Beinhorn, Frank Filipetti, Nathaniel Kunkel, Fred Maher, Andy Wallace and Josh Wilbur, engineers	Fuel
2004	Nature Boy: The Standards Album	Dave O'Donnell, Malcolm Pollack and Elliot Scheiner, engineers	Aaron Neville
2004	North	Kevin Killen and Bill Moss, engineers	Elvis Costello
2005	Genius Loves Company	Robert Fernandez, John Harris, Terry Howard, Pete Karam, Joel Moss, Seth Presant, Al Schmitt and Ed Thacker, engineers	Ray Charles and Various Artists
2005	Brian Wilson Presents Smile	Mark Linett, engineer	Brian Wilson
2005	Feels Like Home	Jay Newland, engineer	Norah Jones
2005	The Girl in the Other Room	Al Schmitt, engineer	Diana Krall
2005	Give	Tchad Blake, engineer	The Bad Plus
2006	Back Home	Alan Douglas and Mick Guzauski, engineers	Eric Clapton
2006	Deceiver	Gary Paczosa and Chris Thile, engineers	Chris Thile
2006	Lonely Runs Both Ways	Gary Paczosa, engineer	Alison Krauss & Union Station
2006	Mr. A-Z	Carl Glanville, Steve Lillywhite, Samuel "Vaughan" Merrick, Jim Scott and David Thoener, engineers	Jason Mraz
2006	Rock Swings	Al Schmitt, engineer	Paul Anka
2007	At War with the Mystics	The Flaming Lips and Dave Fridmann, engineers	The Flaming Lips
2007	Adieu False Heart	Gary Paczosa, engineer	Linda Ronstadt and Ann Savoy
2007	Like Red on a Rose	Brandon Bell, Terry Christian and Gary Paczosa, engineers	Alan Jackson
2007	The Phat Pack	Marcelo Penell, Dave Sharenow and Tommy Vicari, engineers	Gordon Goodwin's Big Phat Band
2007	Suitcase	Rik Pekkonen and John Porter, engineers	Keb' Mo'
2008	Beauty & Crime	Tchad Blake, Cameron Craig, Emery Dobyns and Jimmy Hogarth, engineers	Suzanne Vega
2008	Destination Moon	Dave O'Donnell and Elliot Scheiner, engineers	Deborah Cox
2008	Don't Mess with the Dragon	Robert Carranza, Serban Ghenea, John Hanes and K. C. Porter, engineers	Ozomatli
2008	Floratone	Tucker Martine, engineer	Floratone
2008	II	Jason Lehning, engineer	Viktor Krauss
2009	Consolers of the Lonely	Joe Chiccarelli and Vance Powell, engineers	The Raconteurs
2009	Just a Little Lovin'	Al Schmitt, engineer	Shelby Lynne
2009	Lay It Down	Jimmy Douglass, Russell Elevado and John Smeltz, engineers	Al Green
2009	Still Unforgettable	Steve Genewick, Al Schmitt and Bill Schnee, engineers	Natalie Cole
2009	We Sing. We Dance. We Steal Things.	Dyre Gormsen and Tony Maserati, engineers	Jason Mraz

=== 2010s ===
Year^{[I]}	Work	Recipient(s)	Artist(s)
2010	Ellipse	Imogen Heap, engineer	Imogen Heap
2010	Gossip in the Grain	Ethan Johns and Dominic Monks, engineers	Ray LaMontagne
2010	My One and Only Thrill	Helik Hadar and Al Schmitt, engineers	Melody Gardot
2010	Safe Trip Home	Jon Brion, Jim Scott, Grippa and Greg Koller, engineers	Dido
2010	Swan Feathers	Richard Alderson, Chris Allen, Roman Klun, Jamie Polaski, Lawrence Manchester, Rob Mounsey, Jay Newland, Gene Paul and Gordie Sampson, engineers	Leslie Mendelson
2011	Battle Studies	Michael H. Brauer, Joe Ferla, Chad Franscoviak and Manny Marroquin, engineers	John Mayer
2011	Dirty Side Down	John Keane, engineer	Widespread Panic
2011	Emotion & Commotion	Steve Lipson, engineer	Jeff Beck
2011	God Willin' & the Creek Don't Rise	Ryan Freeland, engineer	Ray LaMontagne and the Pariah Dogs
2011	Pink Elephant	Seth Presant and Leon F. Sylvers III, engineers	N'dambi
2012	Paper Airplane	Mike Shipley and Neal Cappellino, engineers; Brad Blackwood, mastering engineer	Alison Krauss & Union Station
2012	Follow Me Down	Brandon Bell and Gary Paczosa, engineers; Sangwook "Sunny" Nam and Doug Sax, mastering engineers	Sarah Jarosz
2012	The Harrow & The Harvest	Matt Andrews, engineer; Stephen Marcussen, mastering engineer	Gillian Welch
2012	Music Is Better Than Words	Rich Breen and Frank Filipetti, engineers; Bob Ludwig, mastering engineer	Seth MacFarlane
2012	The Next Right Thing	Kevin Killen, Brendan Muldowney and John Shyloski, engineers; John Shyloski, mastering engineer	Seth Glier
2013	The Goat Rodeo Sessions	Richard King, engineer and mastering engineer	Yo-Yo Ma, Stuart Duncan, Edgar Meyer and Chris Thile
2013	The Absence	Moogie Canazio and Al Schmitt, engineers; Bernie Grundman, mastering engineer	Melody Gardot
2013	Ashes & Fire	Glyn Johns, engineer; Bob Ludwig, mastering engineer	Ryan Adams
2013	Love Is a Four Letter Word	Joe Chiccarelli, Steve Churchyard, Tony Maserati, Lars Fox, Graham Hope and Morgan Stratton, engineers; Bob Ludwig, mastering engineer	Jason Mraz
2013	Slingshot	Helik Hadar, engineer; Bernie Grundman, mastering engineer	Rebecca Pidgeon
2014	Random Access Memories	Peter Franco, Mick Guzauski, Daniel Lerner and Florian Lagatta, engineers; Bob Ludwig and Antoine Chabert, mastering engineers	Daft Punk
2014	Annie Up	Chuck Ainlay, engineer; Bob Ludwig, mastering engineer	Pistol Annies
2014	The Blue Room	Helik Hadar and Leslie Ann Jones, engineers; Bernie Grundman, mastering engineer	Madeleine Peyroux
2014	The Devil Put Dinosaurs Here	Paul Figueroa and Randy Staub, engineers; Ted Jensen, mastering engineer	Alice in Chains
2014	...Like Clockwork	Joe Barresi and Mark Rankin, engineers; Gavin Lurssen, mastering engineer	Queens of the Stone Age
2014	The Moorings	Trina Shoemaker, engineer; Eric Conn, mastering engineer	Andrew Duhon
2015	Morning Phase	Drew Brown, Tom Elmhirst, Cole M. Greif-Neill, David Greenbaum, Florian Lagatta, Robbie Nelson, Darrell Thorp, Cassidy Turbin and Joe Visciano, engineers; Bob Ludwig, mastering engineer	Beck
2015	Bass & Mandolin	Richard King and Dave Sinko, engineers; Bob Ludwig, mastering engineer	Chris Thile and Edgar Meyer
2015	Bluesamericana	Ross Hogarth and Casey Wasner, engineers; Richard Dodd, mastering engineer	Keb' Mo'
2015	The Way I'm Livin'	Chuck Ainlay, engineer; Gavin Lurssen, mastering engineer	Lee Ann Womack
2015	What's Left Is Forever	Tchad Blake, Oyvind Jakobsen, Jo Ranheim, Itai Shapiro and Davi Way, engineers; Bernie Grundman, mastering engineer	Thomas Dybdahl
2016	Sound & Color	Shawn Everett, engineer; Bob Ludwig, mastering engineer	Alabama Shakes
2016	Before This World	Dave O'Donnell, engineer; Ted Jensen, mastering engineer	James Taylor
2016	Currency of Man	Maxime Le Guil, engineer; Bernie Grundman, mastering engineer	Melody Gardot
2016	Recreational Love	Greg Kurstin and Alex Pasco, engineers; Emily Lazar, mastering engineer	The Bird and the Bee
2016	Wallflower	Steve Price, Jochem van der Saag and Jorge Vivo, engineers; Paul Blakemore, mastering engineer	Diana Krall
2017	Blackstar	David Bowie, Tom Elmhirst, Kevin Killen and Tony Visconti, engineers; Joe LaPorta, mastering engineer	David Bowie
2017	Are You Serious	Tchad Blake and David Boucher, engineers; Bob Ludwig, mastering engineer	Andrew Bird
2017	Dig In Deep	Ryan Freeland, engineer; Kim Rosen, mastering engineer	Bonnie Raitt
2017	Hit n Run Phase Two	Booker T., Dylan Dresdow, Chris James, Prince and Justin Stanley, engineers; Dylan Dresdow, mastering engineer	Prince
2017	Undercurrent	Shani Gandhi and Gary Paczosa, engineers; Paul Blakemore, mastering engineer	Sarah Jarosz
2018	24K Magic	Serban Ghenea, John Hanes and Charles Moniz, engineers; Tom Coyne, mastering engineer	Bruno Mars
2018	Every Where Is Some Where	Brent Arrowood, Miles Comaskey, JT Daly, Tommy English, Kristine Flaherty, Adam Hawkins, Chad Howat and Tony Maserati, engineers; Joe LaPorta, mastering engineer	K. Flay
2018	Is This the Life We Really Want?	Nigel Godrich, Sam Petts-Davies and Darrell Thorp, engineers; Bob Ludwig, mastering engineer	Roger Waters
2018	Natural Conclusion	Ryan Freeland, engineer; Joao Carvalho, mastering engineer	Rose Cousins
2018	No Shape	Shawn Everett and Joseph Lorge, engineers; Patricia Sullivan, mastering engineer	Perfume Genius
2019	Colors	Julian Burg, Serban Ghenea, David Greenbaum, John Hanes, Beck Hansen, Greg Kurstin, Florian Lagatta, Cole M.G.N., Alex Pasco, Jesse Shatkin, Darrell Thorp and Cassidy Turbin, engineers; Chris Bellman, Tom Coyne, Emily Lazar and Randy Merrill, mastering engineers	Beck
2019	Earthtones	Robbie Lackritz, engineer; Philip Shaw Bova, mastering engineer	Bahamas
2019	All the Things That I Did And All the Things That I Didn't Do	Ryan Freeland and Kenneth Pattengale, engineers; Kim Rosen, mastering engineer	The Milk Carton Kids
2019	Head Over Heels	Nathaniel Alford, Jason Evigan, Chris Galland, Tom Gardner, Patrick "P-Thugg" Gemayel, Serban Ghenea, John Hanes, Tony Hoffer, Derek Keota, Ian Kirkpatrick, David Macklovitch, Amber Mark, Manny Marroquin, Vaughn Oliver, Chris "TEK" O'Ryan, Morgan Taylor Reid and Gian Stone, engineers; Chris Gehringer and Emerson Mancini, mastering engineers	Chromeo
2019	Voicenotes	Manny Marroquin and Charlie Puth, engineers; Dave Kutch, mastering engineer	Charlie Puth

=== 2020s ===
Year^{[I]}	Work	Recipient(s)	Artist(s)
2020	When We All Fall Asleep, Where Do We Go?	Rob Kinelski and Finneas O'Connell, engineers; John Greenham, mastering engineer	Billie Eilish
2020	All These Things	Tchad Blake, Adam Greenspan and Rodney Shearer, engineers; Bernie Grundman, mastering engineer	Thomas Dybdahl
2020	Ella Mai	Chris "Shaggy" Ascher, Jaycen Joshua and David Pizzimenti, engineers; Chris Athens, mastering engineer	Ella Mai
2020	Run Home Slow	Paul Butler and Sam Teskey, engineers; Joe Carra, mastering engineer	The Teskey Brothers
2020	Scenery	Tom Elmhirst, Ben Kane and Jeremy Most, engineers; Bob Ludwig, mastering engineer	Emily King
2021	Hyperspace	Drew Brown, Julian Burg, Andrew Coleman, Paul Epworth, Shawn Everett, Serban Ghenea, David Greenbaum, John Hanes, Beck Hansen, Jaycen Joshua, Greg Kurstin, Mike Larson, Cole M.G.N., Alex Pasco and Matt Wiggins, engineers; Randy Merrill, mastering engineer	Beck
2021	Black Hole Rainbow	Shawn Everett and Ivan Wayman, engineers; Bob Ludwig, mastering engineer	Devon Gilfillian
2021	Expectations	Gary Paczosa and Mike Robinson, engineers; Paul Blakemore, mastering engineer	Katie Pruitt
2021	Jaime	Shawn Everett, engineer/mastering engineer	Brittany Howard
2021	25 Trips	Shani Gandhi and Gary Paczosa, engineers; Adam Grover, mastering engineer	Sierra Hull
2022	Love for Sale	Dae Bennett, Josh Coleman and Billy Cumella, engineers; Greg Calbi and Steve Fallone, mastering engineers	Tony Bennett and Lady Gaga
2022	Cinema	Josh Conway, Marvin Figueroa, Josh Gudwin, Neal H Pogue and Ethan Shumaker, engineers; Joe LaPorta, mastering engineer	The Marías
2022	Dawn	Thomas Brenneck, Zach Brown, Elton "L10MixedIt" Chueng, Riccardo Damian, Tom Elmhirst, Jens Jungkurth, Todd Monfalcone, John Rooney and Smino, engineers; Randy Merrill, mastering engineer	Yebba
2022	Hey What	B.J. Burton, engineer/mastering engineer	Low
2022	Notes with Attachments	Joseph Lorge and Blake Mills, engineers; Greg Koller, mastering engineer	Pino Palladino and Blake Mills
2023	Harry's House	Jeremy Hatcher, Oli Jacobs, Nick Lobel, Mark "Spike" Stent and Sammy Witte, engineers; Randy Merrill, mastering engineer	Harry Styles
2023	Adolescence	Yonatan (Yoni) Ayal, Maxwell Byrne, Patrick Liney, Tim Nelson, Jock Nowell-Usticke, Aidan Peterson, Pierre Luc Rioux, Ike Schultz, Rutger Van Woudenberg, George Nicholas and Ryan Schwabe, engineers; Ryan Schwabe, mastering engineer	Baynk
2023	Black Radio III	Daniel Farris, Tiffany Gouché, Qmillion, Musiq Soulchild, Reginald Nicholas, Q-Tip, Amir Sulaiman, Michael Law Thomas and Jon Zacks, engineers; Chris Athens, mastering engineer	Robert Glasper
2023	Chloë and the Next 20th Century	Dave Cerminara and Jonathan Wilson, engineers; Adam Ayan, mastering engineer	Father John Misty
2023	Wet Leg	Jon McMullen, Joshua Mobaraki, Alan Moulder and Alexis Smith, engineers; Matt Colton, mastering engineer	Wet Leg
2024	Jaguar II	John Kercy, Kyle Mann, Victoria Monét, Patrizio "Teezio" Pigliapoco, Neal H Pogue and Todd Robinson, engineers; Colin Leonard, mastering engineer	Victoria Monét
2024	Desire, I Want to Turn Into You	Macks Faulkron, Daniel Harle, Caroline Polachek and Geoff Swan, engineers; Mike Bozzi and Chris Gehringer, mastering engineers	Caroline Polachek
2024	History	Nic Hard, engineer; Dave McNair, mastering engineer	Bokanté
2024	Multitudes	Michael Harris, Robbie Lackritz, Joseph Lorge and Blake Mills, engineers	Feist
2024	The Record	Owen Lantz, Will Maclellan, Catherine Marks, Mike Mogis, Bobby Mota, Kaushlesh "Garry" Purohit and Sarah Tudzin, engineers; Pat Sullivan, mastering engineer	Boygenius
2025	I/O	Tchad Blake, Oli Jacobs, Katie May and Dom Shaw, engineers; Matt Colton, mastering engineer	Peter Gabriel
2025	Algorithm	Dernst Emile II, Michael B. Hunter, Stephan Johnson, Rachel Keen, John Kercy, Charles Moniz and Todd Robinson, engineers; Colin Leonard, mastering engineer	Lucky Daye
2025	Cyan Blue	Jack Emblem, Jack Rochon and Charlotte Day Wilson, engineers; Chris Gehringer, mastering engineer	Charlotte Day Wilson
2025	Deeper Well	Craig Alvin, Shawn Everett, Mai Leisz, Todd Lombardo, John Rooney, Konrad Snyder and Daniel Tashian, engineers; Greg Calbi, mastering engineer	Kacey Musgraves
2025	Empathogen	Beatriz Artola, Zach Brown, Oscar Cornejo, Chris Greatti and Mitch McCarthy, engineers; Joe LaPorta, mastering engineer	Willow
2025	Short n' Sweet	Bryce Bordone, Jack Antonoff, Julian Bunetta, Serban Ghenea, Jeff Gunnell, Oli Jacobs, Ian Kirkpatrick, Jack Manning, Manny Marroquin, John Ryan and Laura Sisk, engineers; Nathan Dantzler and Ruairi O'Flaherty, mastering engineers	Sabrina Carpenter
2026	That Wasn't a Dream	Joseph Lorge and Blake Mills, engineers; Patricia Sullivan, mastering engineer	Pino Palladino and Blake Mills
2026	All Things Light	Jesse Brock, Jon Castelli, Tyler Johnson, Nick Lobel, Simon Maartensson, Lawrence "Boo" Mitchell, Anders Mouridsen, Ryan Nasci, Ernesto Olvera-LaPier, Ethan Schneiderman, Matt Chamberlain, Rob Moose, Rahm Silverglade and Owen Stoutt, engineers; Dale Becker, mastering engineer	Cam
2026	Arcadia	Neal Capellino and Garry Paczosa, engineers; Brad Blackwood, mastering engineer	Alison Krauss & Union Station
2026	For Melancholy Brunettes (& Sad Women)	Joseph Lorge, Blake Mills and Sebastian Reunert, engineers; Patricia Sullivan, mastering engineer	Japanese Breakfast
2027	The Art of Loving	Julian Bunetta, Austin Christy, Dan Ewins, Jeff Gunnell, Charlie Holmes, Zach Nahome, John Ryan, Jan Trafas, Max Wolfgang and Matt Zara, engineers; Simon Francis, mastering engineer	Olivia Dean
2027	Lux (Complete Works)	Daniel Cayotte, Isaac Diskin, Tom Elmhirst, Nigel Godrich, Tristan Hoogland, Mike Larson, Manny Marroquin, Jake Miller, Joaquim Monte, Alberto Pérez, Billy Ray, David Rodríguez, Marta Salogni, Bergur Thorisson and Harry Wilson, engineers; Bob Jackson and Brian Lee, mastering engineers	Rosalía
2027	Middle of Nowhere	Bryce Bordone, Serban Ghenea, Konrad Snyder and Mike Stankiewicz, engineers; Adam Grover, mastering engineer	Kacey Musgraves
2027	Nine Inch Noize	Boys Noize, Jacob Moreno, Trent Reznor and Atticus Ross, engineers; Boys Noize, Jacob Moreno, Trent Reznor and Atticus Ross, mastering engineers	Nine Inch Nails and Boys Noize
2027	The Thread	Joe Dougherty, Chris Greatti, Mitch McCarthy, Adam Schoeller and Willow Smith, engineers; Nathan Dantzler, mastering engineer	Willow

== Multiple wins ==
10 wins

- Al Schmitt

5 wins

- Bruce Swedien

4 wins

- Roger Nichols

3 wins

- Tchad Blake
- Geoff Emerick
- Serban Ghenea
- David Greenbaum
- John Hanes
- Florian Lagatta
- Bob Ludwig
- Randy Merrill
- Elliot Scheiner
- Darrell Thorp

2 wins

- Drew Brown
- Julian Burg
- Tom Coyne
- Tom Elmhirst
- Shawn Everett
- Humberto Gatica
- Mick Guzauski
- Beck Hansen
- Oli Jacobs
- Greg Kurstin
- Tom Lord-Alge
- Cole M.G.N.
- Blake Mills
- Alex Pasco
- Bill Schnee
- Armin Steiner
- Cassidy Turbin

== Multiple nominations ==
29 nominations

- Al Schmitt

13 nominations

- Elliot Scheiner

12 nominations

- Bob Ludwig

11 nominations

- Gary Paczosa
- Bill Schnee

10 nominations

- Bruce Swedien

8 nominations

- Alan Parsons

7 nominations

- Tchad Blake
- Don Murray

6 nominations

- Shawn Everett
- Serban Ghenea
- Bernie Grundman
- Mick Guzauski
- Roger Nichols
- Robert Simpson

5 nominations

- John Hanes
- Joseph Lorge
- George Massenburg
- Armin Steiner
- Tommy Vicari

4 nominations

- Dick Bogert
- Ed Cherney
- Tom Elmhirst
- Ryan Freeland
- Humberto Gatica
- Kevin Killen
- Frank Laico
- Joe LaPorta
- James Malloy
- Manny Marroquin
- Tony Maserati
- Randy Merrill
- Blake Mills
- Rik Pekkonen
- Jim Scott
- Patricia Sullivan
- Darrell Thorp
- Luis P. Valentin

3 nominations

- Paul Blakemore
- Moogie Canazio
- Joe Chiccarelli
- Bob Clearmountain
- Hugh Davies
- Neil Dorfsman
- Geoff Emerick
- Frank Filipetti
- Chris Gehringer
- Josiah Gluck
- Nigel Godrich
- David Greenbaum
- Oli Jacobs
- John Kraus
- Greg Kurstin
- Florian Lagatta
- Tom Lord-Alge
- Jay Newland
- Dave O'Donnell
- Alex Pasco
- Phil Ramone
- Ken Scott
- Chuck Seitz
- Trina Shoemaker
- Andy Wallace

2 nominations

- Chris Athens
- Ray Bardani
- Brandon Bell
- Chris Bell
- Brad Blackwood
- Bill Bottrell
- Doug Brand
- Rich Breen
- "Bassy" Bob Brockmann
- Drew Brown
- Zach Brown
- Julian Burg
- Robin Geoffrey Cable
- Greg Calbi
- Steve Churchyard
- Matt Colton
- Jason Corsaro
- Tom Coyne
- Richard Dashut
- Dylan Dresdow
- Richard Dodd
- Robert Fine
- Shani Gandhi
- Val Garay
- Ray Gerhardt
- Roy Halee
- Beck Hansen
- Bones Howe
- Andy Jackson
- Jaycen Joshua
- John Kercy
- Rob Kingsland
- Ian Kirkpatrick
- Tom Knox
- Greg Koller
- Robbie Lackritz
- Emily Lazar
- Colin Leonard
- Larry Levine
- Nick Lobel
- Gary Loizzo
- Cole M.G.N.
- Phil McDonald
- Charles Moniz
- John Neal
- Hugh Padgham
- Neal H Pogue
- Joe Polito
- John Potoker
- Seth Presant
- Carmen Rizzo
- Todd Robinson
- John Rooney
- Kim Rosen
- Mike Shipley
- Alan Sides
- Don Smith
- Ronald A. Steele
- Tom Trefethen
- Cassidy Turbin
- William Vandevort

== Summary ==
Breakdown by genre as of 2021.
1. Pop (27.0%)
2. Rock (22.0%)
3. Jazz (16.0%)
4. Folk (8.00%)
5. R&B (8.00%)
6. Soundtrack (3.00%)
7. Soul (3.00%)
8. Blues (3.00%)
9. Bluegrass (3.00%)
10. Other (7.00%)
