= Bob Ludwig =

American audio mastering engineer (born 1944)

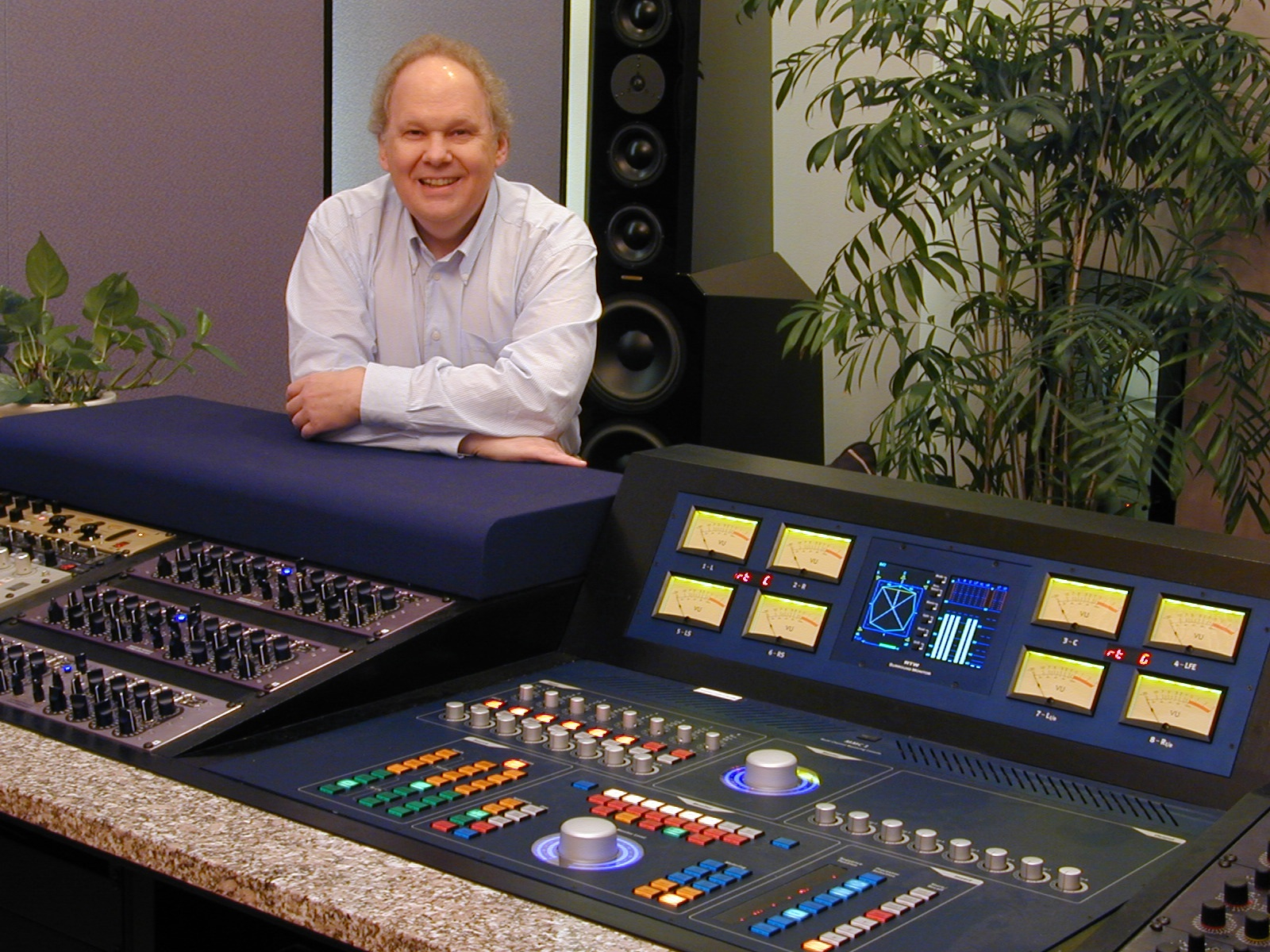
- Ludwig in 2008
- Born: Robert Carl Ludwig; December 11, 1944 (age 81); Savannah, Georgia, U.S.
- Education: Eastman School of Music (BA and MA)
- Occupation: Mastering engineer
- Years active: 1960–2023

Robert Carl Ludwig (born December 11, 1944) is a retired American mastering engineer. He mastered recordings on all the major recording formats for all the major record labels, and on projects by more than 1,300 artists, including Led Zeppelin, Lou Reed, Metallica, Queen, Jimi Hendrix, Bryan Ferry, Paul McCartney, Nirvana, Bruce Springsteen, Radiohead, Tool and Daft Punk, with more than 3,000 credits. He is the recipient of thirteen Grammy and other awards. In 1992, Ludwig founded his own mastering facility, Gateway Mastering Studios, in Portland, Maine. He retired in 2023.

== Biography ==
At the age of eight in South Salem, New York, Ludwig was so fascinated with his first tape recorder that he used to make recordings of whatever was on the radio. Ludwig is a classical musician by training, having obtained his bachelor's and master's degrees from the Eastman School of Music of the University of Rochester in New York. He was also involved in the sound department at Eastman, as well as being principal trumpet of the Utica Symphony Orchestra. Inspired by Phil Ramone when he came to Eastman to teach a summer recording workshop, Ludwig ended up working as his assistant. Afterwards, he was contacted and offered work with Ramone at A&R Recording.

After a few years at A&R, Ludwig received an offer from Sterling Sound, where he eventually became a vice president. After seven years at Sterling, he moved to its competitor, Masterdisk, where he was vice president and chief engineer. In December 1992, Ludwig left Masterdisk to start his own record mastering facility, Gateway Mastering Studios, in Portland, Maine.

== Work ==
Ludwig's mastering credits include albums for classical artists such as the Kronos Quartet, and rock acts, including Jimi Hendrix, Phish, Rush, Mötley Crüe, Megadeth, Metallica, Gloria Estefan, Nirvana, the Strokes, Queen, U2, Sting, the Police, Janet Jackson, Mariah Carey, Beck, Guns N' Roses, Richie Sambora, Tool, Simple Minds, Bryan Ferry, Tori Amos, Bonnie Raitt, Mark Knopfler, Leonard Cohen, David Bowie, Paul McCartney, Bruce Springsteen, the Bee Gees, Madonna, Richard Wood, Supertramp, Will Ackerman, Pet Shop Boys, Radiohead, Elton John, Daft Punk, Avenged Sevenfold and Alabama Shakes. Ludwig occasionally undertook larger projects, such as remastering the back catalogues of Rush, Dire Straits, Creedence Clearwater Revival and the Rolling Stones.

As a judge for the 8th and 10th-14th annual Independent Music Awards, Ludwig's contributions helped assist the careers of upcoming independent artists. Ludwig is active in the Audio Engineering Society and is a past chairman of the New York AES section. He was co-chair of the Producers and Engineers Wing for 5 years and is presently on the Advisory Council of the P&E Wing of National Academy of Recording Arts and Sciences.

On July 2, 2023, Ludwig announced that he had retired and had closed Gateway Mastering: "Music has always been my love. I’ll miss you and the whole music community with whom I’ve worked. I wake up every day enjoying what I do, which has been such a blessing. It’s been an extraordinary experience to work with you all these years."

Ludwig ended his career with 7,892 credits listed on the Discogs database and is listed on that database as the most collected individual or group in the music industry, performing artists included.

== Awards and recognition ==
=== Grammy Awards ===
Grammy Award nominations for Bob Ludwig
Year	Nominee / work	Award	Result
2003	The Rising	Album Of The Year	Nominated
2005	Avalon	Best Surround Sound Album	Nominated
2006	Brothers In Arms - 20th Anniversary Edition	Best Surround Sound Album	Won
2006	In Your Honor	Best Surround Sound Album	Nominated
2008	Lorraine Hunt Lieberson Sings Peter Lieberson: Neruda Songs	Best Classical Album	Nominated
2009	In Rainbows	Album of the Year	Nominated
2009	Viva la Vida or Death and All His Friends	Album of the Year	Nominated
2012	Layla and Other Assorted Love Songs (Super Deluxe Edition)	Best Surround Sound Album	Won
2012	Music Is Better Than Words	Best Engineered Album, Non-Classical	Nominated
2013	Ashes & Fire	Best Engineered Album, Non-Classical	Nominated
2013	Love Is a Four Letter Word	Best Engineered Album, Non-Classical	Nominated
2013	Babel	Album of the Year	Won
2013	Blunderbuss	Album of the Year	Nominated
2014	Random Access Memories	Album of the Year	Won
2014	Random Access Memories	Best Engineered Album, Non-Classical	Won
2014	Annie Up	Best Engineered Album, Non-Classical	Nominated
2014	"Get Lucky"	Record of the Year	Won
2014	Charlie Is My Darling - Ireland 1965	Best Historical Album	Won
2015	G I R L	Album of the Year	Nominated
2015	Morning Phase	Album of the Year	Won
2015	Morning Phase	Best Engineered Album, Non-Classical	Won
2015	Bass & Mandolin	Best Engineered Album, Non-Classical	Nominated
2015	Beyoncé	Best Surround Sound Album	Won
2016	Sound & Color	Album of the Year	Nominated
2016	Sound & Color	Best Engineered Album, Non-Classical	Won
2017	Are You Serious	Best Engineered Album, Non-Classical	Nominated
2018	Is This the Life We Really Want?	Best Engineered Album, Non-Classical	Nominated
2020	Scenery	Best Engineered Album, Non-Classical	Nominated
2020	Riley: Sun Rings	Best Engineered Album, Classical	Won
2020	Kverndokk: Symphonic Dances	Best Immersive Audio Album	Nominated
2020	The Savior	Best Immersive Audio Album	Nominated
2021	Black Hole Rainbow	Best Engineered Album, Non-Classical	Nominated
2022	Clique	Best Immersive Audio Album	Nominated
2022	The Future Bites	Best Immersive Audio Album	Nominated
2023	Yankee Hotel Foxtrot (2022 Remaster)	Best Historical Album	Won

=== APRS ===
2012: Association of Professional Recording Services Sound Fellowship - received 27 October 2012

=== Audio Engineering Society ===
2015: AES Gold Medal
