= Kimaya Diggs =

American singer-songwriter

- Born: 1992 or 1993 (age 33–34)
- Origin: Northampton, Massachusetts, U.S.
- Genres: Soul; R&B; Indie folk; Indie pop
- Occupations: Singer-songwriter; record producer
- Instruments: Vocals; guitar; cello
- Years active: 2018–present
- Label: Independent

Kimaya Diggs (born 1992 or 1993) is an American singer-songwriter based in Northampton, Massachusetts. Her music combines acoustic and indie-folk foundations with elements of soul, R&B and jazz. She has released three studio albums as an independent artist: Breastfed (2018), Quincy (2023) and Green (2026).

== Early life ==
Diggs grew up in western Massachusetts, the daughter of a Black father and an Indian mother. As a child she played music with her two sisters, learning instruments including cello, violin and viola. She attended college in Pennsylvania before returning to western Massachusetts.

== Career ==
=== Breastfed (2018) ===
Diggs released her debut album, Breastfed, in 2018. It was made with bassist Jacob Rosazza. Most of the songs feature Diggs accompanying herself on acoustic guitar, with occasional cello. WBUR later described the record as contemplative and self-produced in character.

=== Quincy (2023) ===
Diggs began work on her second album before the COVID-19 pandemic and continued it through 2020. In 2021 her mother died of cancer, a close friend and musical mentor was killed in a bicycle accident, and her dog, a retired racing greyhound named Quincy, died. The album was named after the dog. Diggs aimed for a fuller sound than on her debut, and her father contributed flute to three tracks.

Quincy was released on March 9, 2023, preceded by the singles "If You Love Me" and "Rainbow". Under the Radar characterized the album's style as indie pop with R&B and soul elements. In a 2023 profile, WBUR highlighted the album's retro-influenced R&B arrangements and noted that Diggs did not regard it as an album about grief. Later that year she released an EP of live versions of songs from the album.

=== "Everything Is Not Lost" (2024) ===
In 2024 Diggs released the single "Everything Is Not Lost", which she described as more dance-oriented than her earlier work. She photographed the single's cover art herself.

=== Green (2026) ===
Diggs released three singles ahead of her third album: "I Know That I'm Perfect", a rock-influenced track, followed by "Dance with Me" and "Plants (Still Grow)". Green was released on October 2, 2026. It is the first of her albums on which she is credited in a production role: she co-produced the record and engineered roughly a quarter of it. She and her partner, also a musician, converted the basement of their Northampton home into a studio and rehearsal space. Eighty-two artists from western Massachusetts contributed to the album.

The album explores the question of what makes a place feel like home and Diggs's relationship with the region where she grew up. The song "A Sense of Place" addresses the racial isolation she experienced in New England. The title refers to the point each spring when trees leaf out almost all at once.

== Live performance ==
Diggs has performed as a supporting act for artists including Mavis Staples, Trombone Shorty, Emily King and Tank and the Bangas.

== Discography ==
=== Studio albums ===
- Breastfed (2018)
- Quincy (2023)
- Green (2026)

=== Singles ===
- "If You Love Me" (2023)
- "Rainbow" (2023)
- "Everything Is Not Lost" (2024)
- "I Know That I'm Perfect" (2026)
- "Dance with Me" (2026, from Green)
- "Plants (Still Grow)" (2026, from Green)
