= Pink Elephant (N'Dambi album) =

Studio album by N'dambi
- Released: October 6, 2009
- Recorded: 2009
- Genres: R&B; nu soul; jazz; funk
- Length: 51:05 (standard); 63:53 (European)
- Label: Stax Records
- Producer: Leon Sylvers III

N'dambi chronology
A Weird Kind Of Wonderful (2005)	Pink Elephant (2009)

Singles from Pink Elephant
- 1. "Can't Hardly Wait" Released: September 15, 2009; 2. "Ooo Baby" Released: July 11, 2011

Pink Elephant is the fourth studio album by American recording artist N'Dambi. A neo soul record that incorporates elements of jazz and funk, it focuses on themes including double lives, love-hate relationships, true love, betrayal, and the music industry. N'Dambi highlighted classic R&B artists such as Betty Davis and Smokey Robinson as her influences when recording the album; for the album's writing and production, she worked with Leon Sylvers III, who was known for his work with artists including Gladys Knight, Shalamar, and Blackstreet.

The album was released in the United States on October 6, 2009, by Stax Records, and in the United Kingdom on February 22, 2010. It marked N'Dambi's major-label debut, after having independently released her first three records. It also marked the first full-length release by Stax following its closure then reestablishment. Upon its release, the album received favorable reviews from critics, who praised the storytelling lyrics and N'Dambi's vocal performance; it also received a nomination at the 53rd Annual Grammy Awards for Best Engineered Album, Non-Classical. The album attained a peak of number 42 on the Billboard Top R&B/Hip-Hop Albums chart, as well as number 31 on the Heatseekers Albums chart. Additionally, the lead single, "Can't Hardly Wait", entered the Hot R&B/Hip-Hop Songs chart and became a top 40 hit on the Adult R&B Songs chart. The album also spawned a second single, "Ooo Baby".

== Background ==
N'dambi, born Chonita Gilbert, began her music career at age 18 as a background vocalist for Gaye Arbuckle, a gospel singer in her native Dallas, Texas. After two years as a backup singer for Arbuckle, Gilbert began working with neo-soul singer Erykah Badu, recording backing vocals for her 1997 debut album Baduizm, including on the track "Certainly (Flipped It)". Gilbert also began recording music as a solo artist, and independently released her debut studio album, Little Lost Girls Blues, in 1999; the record went on to sell over 70,000 copies, primarily driven by word of mouth promotion. She went on to independently release two more studio albums before signing with the newly-reformed record label Stax in 2006. Regarding the significance of her signing with the label, Gilbert stated in an interview that it was "a connection to my Southern roots. I knew it was a label that started in the South that was the soundtrack to many people's lives. Those songs have stories behind the music. I wanted to create music that did that."

For her fourth studio album, and first to be released by a major label, Gilbert partnered with Leon Sylvers III, a producer best known for his soul and disco work with artists including Shalamar, The Whispers, and Lakeside in the early 1980s, as well as later work with artists like Blackstreet. The album was recorded in Santa Monica, California and produced in Los Angeles. Gilbert named the album Pink Elephant as a nod to the phrase "elephant in the room", with the album's "elephant" representing "people understanding their purpose in life and their greatness and how, when they do embrace it, they should shine to their FULLEST!" — and that that shining would be impossible to ignore, like an elephant in the room. She selected the color pink, meanwhile, for its symbolism of hope and strength.

== Composition ==
Gilbert cited Slave, Heatwave, The Jacksons, Betty Davis, Isaac Hayes, Smokey Robinson, Earth, Wind & Fire, and The Sylvers as influences in writing and recording the album. In a 2010 interview, she stated that, when writing her songs, she occasionally drew from personal experiences, but more often focused on storytelling: "I think of the place, the time, the setting of a story, and invent a situation that shines a light on a particular issue or theme."

Album opener "L.I.E.", an abbreviation for Long Island Expressway, tells the story of a man living along the expressway as he leads a double life. The song takes influence from jazz and funk. "Ooo Baby" chronicles a reconnection with an ex-lover, while "The One" is a jazz-influenced ballad about true love. "Can't Hardly Wait" is a mid-tempo song chronicling a love-hate relationship that drew comparison to Badu's "Tyrone". Its hook prominently features the phrase "fuckinwitchu". On the mid-tempo "Imitator", N'Dambi tells the story of a young woman whose lover doesn't keep his promises; the song features the lyric "You’re not the man I used to know, you’re an imitator."

== Release ==
In advance of the album's release, its lead single, "Can't Hardly Wait", was released by Stax Records on September 15, 2009, as a digital download. The album was then released by Stax on October 6, 2009, becoming her major-label debut studio album, as well as the first album to be released by the label following their dissolution and subsequent re-establishment. It was her fourth studio album overall and her third to be released in the United States, with one of her prior records, A Weird Kinda Wonderful, having been released only in Japan and since becoming a collector's item. Pink Elephant was subsequently released in the United Kingdom on February 22, 2010; the UK edition of the album included two bonus tracks, an a capella version of "Can't Hardly Wait" and a remix of "The World is a Beat". To promote Pink Elephant, Stax released the recipe for a vodka-based cocktail named in honor of the album. On July 11, 2011, "Ooo Baby" was released as the album's second single.

In the issue of Billboard dated October 24, 2009, Pink Elephant debuted at number 31 on the Heatseekers Albums chart, as well as number 60 on the Top R&B/Hip-Hop Albums chart; "Can't Hardly Wait" concurrently entered the Hot R&B/Hip-Hop Songs chart at number 99. The following week, it saw a 69% gain in sales, causing it to jump 18 spots to number 42 on the Top R&B/Hip-Hop Albums chart, earning the week's "Pacesetter" designation. That week, it fell one spot on the Heatseekers Albums chart, while "Can't Hardly Wait" rose nine spots on the Hot R&B/Hip-Hop Songs chart. Pink Elephant fell to number 49 on the R&B/Hip-Hop Albums chart dated November 7, 2009, its third and final week on the tally. "Can't Hardly Wait" ultimately attained a peak of number 78 on the Hot R&B/Hip-Hop Songs chart in late December 2009, spending a total of 17 weeks on the chart. It also became a top 40 hit on the Adult R&B Songs chart, where it peaked at number 22.

== Critical reception ==
Professional ratings
Review scores
Source	Rating
PopMatters	7/10 stars
Spin	7/10 stars

Upon its release, Pink Elephant received favorable reviews from music critics, holding a score of 77 out of 100 on review aggregator Album of the Year, based on three reviews. Writing for Billboard, critic Gail Mitchell praised both the album's lyrics for "keenly observ(ing) life's frequent ironies", as well as N'Dambi's vocals for being "rich" and "earthy". Mitchell went on to single out "Nobody Jones", "What It Takes", and "Can't Hardly Wait" as highlights and concluded that N'Dambi is among the few artists "who can truly make the listener feel a song." Lloyd Bradley, in a review for the BBC, hailed the album as "that rare beast: a soul album that sounds completely modern yet fulfills all traditional expectations". Bradley commended N'Dambi for building her music's backing track around her lyrics, instead of the other way around, and praised her storytelling songwriting for creating a "mini-drama". He praised the a capella version of "Can't Hardly Wait" for "bringing out its true sentiments", and concluded that the album sounds like the music one would "expect from the likes of Smokey Robinson or Gladys Knight had they been born 40 years later".

=== Accolades ===
At the 53rd Annual Grammy Awards, Pink Elephant earned N'Dambi her first Grammy nomination, for Best Engineered Album, Non-Classical. The award ultimately went to John Mayer's fourth studio album, Battle Studies.

== Track listing ==
All tracks are written by N'Dambi and Leon Sylvers III, except where noted.

No.	Title	Writer(s)	Length
1.	"L.I.E."	N'Dambi; Leon Sylvers III; Stephen Shockley	4:44
2.	"What It Takes"		3:32
3.	"Nobody Jones"	N'Dambi; Sylvers III; Leon Sylvers IV	4:20
4.	"Ooo Baby"		5:11
5.	"Mind Blowin'"		3:36
6.	"The One"		4:50
7.	"Take It Out"	N'Dambi; Sylvers III; Alston Williams; Dana Marshall; Joe Williams; Mark Woolard	4:12
8.	"Daisy Chain"		3:54
9.	"Can't Hardly Wait"	N'Dambi; Sylvers III; James Butler, Jr.; Ronnie Breaux, Jr.; Samir Moulay Elmehdaoui	4:28
10.	"The World Is a Beat"	N'Dambi, Sylvers III, Shockley	4:12
11.	"Imitator"	N'Dambi; Sylvers III; Butler; Breaux; Elmehdaoui	5:08
12.	"Free Fallin' (Bonus Track)"		5:02
Total length:			51:05

EU edition bonus tracks
No.	Title	Length
13.	"Can't Hardly Wait" (a capella version)	3:55
14.	"The World is a Beat" (Soulflower mix)	7:53
Total length:		63:53

== Charts ==
Chart (2009)	Peak position
US Heatseekers Albums	31
US Top R&B/Hip-Hop Albums	42
