= Tunin' Up & Cosignin' =

Studio album by N'dambi
- Released: 2001
- Genre: R&B
- Length: mm:ss
- Label: Cheeky-i Productions
- Producer: Madukwu Chinwah

Professional ratings
Review scores
Source	Rating
Allmusic	4.5/5 stars

Tunin' Up & Cosignin' is a two disc set by N'dambi. It is her second effort. It focuses on a more jazzy sound with live instrumentation. The album contains many songs from her debut, re-worked to fit the environment of the album. Tunin' Up & Cosignin' has a few skits with her and her band. It demonstrates, even further, the influence of jazz artist Nina Simone. The first track is a seven-minute-long tribute to her, simply titled, "Ode 2 Nina". N'dambi explores her jazz artistry with scatting, among other things.

== Track listing ==
=== Disc 1 ===
1. "Ode 2 Nina"
2. "People"
3. "... R.C., what was u doing?"
4. "Day Dreamer"
5. "Do Mat Mare Ray"
6. "Call Me"
7. "Bitter Bitter Blue"
8. "Crazy World"
9. "See U In My Dreams"
10. "Y'all ready, fool?"
11. "Hot Pearl C"
12. "Black Star"
13. "Leave it Just Like That"

=== Disc 2 ===
1. "Lonely Woman" / "Eva's Song"
2. "Soul From the Abyss"
3. "Soul... Day Dreamer"
4. "Deep"
5. "Blueprint 4..."
6. "Picture This" / "Can This Be Love"
7. "Lock, Playin' his own shi..."
8. "I Think 4 Sure"
9. "What's Wrong With U"
10. "The Sunshine"
11. "Broke My Heart"
