= N'Dambi =

American singer from Dallas, TX

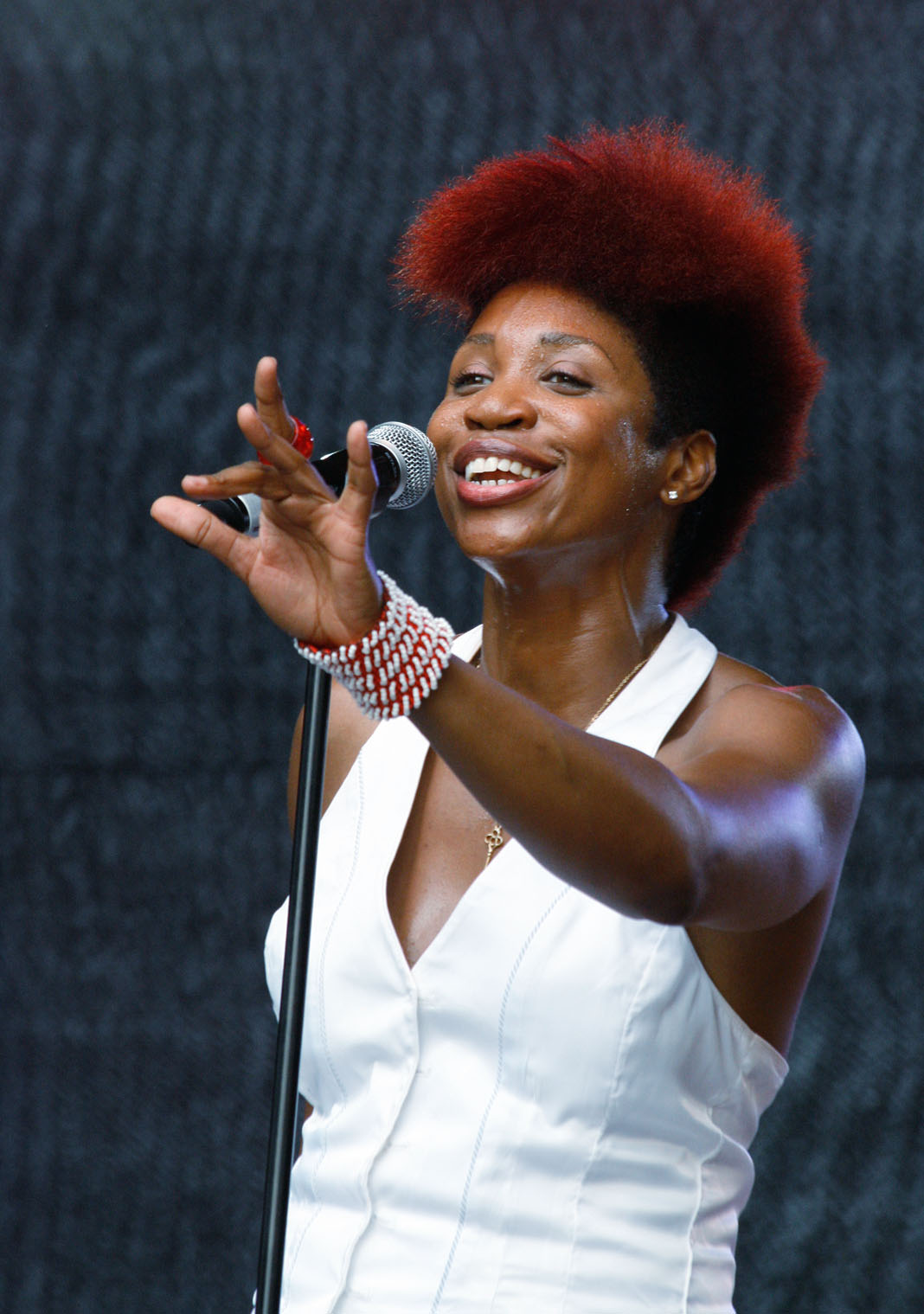
- N'Dambi at the Vienna Jazz Festival 2010

Background information
- Born: Chonita N. Gillespie [Gilbert] June 16, 1969 (age 57); Dallas, Texas, U.S.
- Genres: R&B; soul; jazz; rock; pop; Indie soul
- Occupations: Musician, singer-songwriter
- Instrument: Vocals, Piano
- Labels: Concord Music Group2006–present, Cheeky-I (independent)1998-2019
- Website: NDambiOnline.com

N'Dambi (born June 16, 1969) is an American soul/jazz singer from Dallas, Texas.

== Early life ==
N'Dambi is the ninth of eleven children born to a Baptist minister and missionary. Her name, "N'Dambi" means "most beautiful". Her father was a minister and singer in a quartet group. She got her professional start singing with Gaye Arbuckle, a local gospel singer, touring with Arbuckle for two years (from the ages of 18 to 20). Shortly thereafter she sang as background singer and collaborator with Erykah Badu. In the liner notes for Badu's debut studio album, Baduizm (1997), she thanked N’Dambi for her backing vocals on "Certainly (Flipped It)", calling her by her nickname, "Butterfly".

== Career ==
=== Little Lost Girls Blues ===
N'Dambi debut soul album Little Lost Girls Blues was recorded in 1996 in Oak Cliff, a community in Dallas. It was independently released in 1999 and went on to receive critical acclaim throughout the world. It sound scanned over 20,000 units and sold over 70,000 units worldwide. The album was primarily marketed via word of mouth lifestyle marketing, press and college radio.

=== Tunin' Up & Co-Siginin' ===
This two disc set contains live recordings from Little Lost Girls Blues and new recordings. The album was recorded in Dallas with a group of local musicians. It featured Ode 2 Nina, was a tribute song to Nina Simone.

=== A Weird Kind of Wonderful ===
This album was released independently and recorded with a live band in Los Angeles, California. It has a more funk, rock, soul vibe with more influences of Mother's Finest and Tina Turner.

=== Pink Elephant ===
Pink Elephant was recorded in Santa Monica, California with producer Leon Sylvers III. N'dambi insisted the record have a modern sheen yet adhere to the sturdy influence of classic R&B and soul artists like Slave, Heatwave, Michael Jackson, Betty Davis, Isaac Hayes, Smokey Robinson, Earth, Wind & Fire, and The Sylvers. On December 2, 2010, Pink Elephant was nominated for a 2011 Grammy Award for Best Engineered Album.

=== Work with other artists ===
N'Dambi has collaborated with artists such as Keite Young, Down To The Bone, Lecrae and The D.O.C. She has also worked with Jessie J, Ariana Grande, Nicholas Payton, DJ Kemit and Snarky Puppy's Family Dinner vol. 1. N'Dambi's performance on that album earned her a SESAC Award for Best Jazz Performance.

== Discography ==
Albums:
Little Lost Girls Blues
- First studio album
- Released: September 7, 1999
- Cheeky-I Productions
Tunin' Up & Cosignin'
- Two-Disc Set
- Released: August 14, 2001
- Cheeky-I Productions
A Weird Kind of Wonderful
- Released in Japan
- Released: November 16, 2005
- Village Again/Coco Red Music
Pink Elephant
- Released: October 6, 2009
- Stax Records
- Single: "Can't Hardly Wait"
Dream Junkie
- Released: September 17, 2024
- Released independently through Bandcamp
- Single: "Follow Me"
Remixes/Singles:
"Call Me" (Yam Who reworks)
- Release 2003
- label: Yam Who
- 12" Vinyl, Unofficial Release
"Can't Change Me" (Ron Trent Remix)
- Release 2007
- label: R2Records
- 12" Vinyl
"If We Were Alone" with Keite Young (AaronCarl Mix)
- Release 2008
- label Wallshaker Music
- 12" Vinyl
