= East Side Story (Emily King album) =

Studio album by Emily King
- Released: August 28, 2007
- Recorded: 2005–2007
- Genres: R&B; soul; hip hop
- Length: 53:02
- Label: J
- Producer: Chucky Thompson

Emily King chronology
East Side Story (2007)	The Switch (2015)

Singles from East Side Story
- 1. "Walk in My Shoes" Released: June 12, 2007; 2. "U & I" Released: 2007

Professional ratings
Review scores
Source	Rating
About.com	3/5 stars
Artistdirect	3/5 stars
USA Today	3/4 stars

East Side Story is the debut studio album by American singer-songwriter Emily King. It was released by J Records on August 28, 2007, in the United States. Chiefly produced by Chucky Thompson, the album included five songs from her EP East Side Story Sampler (2006). East Side Story was nominated for a Grammy Award for Best Contemporary R&B Album at the 50th ceremony.

== Track listing ==
No.	Title	Writer(s)	Producer(s)	Length
1.	"Walk in My Shoes"	Emily King; Big Drawz; Marilyn McLeod; Pam Sawyer; Chucky Thompson	Thompson; King^{[a]}	3:24
2.	"Colorblind"	King; Rasheem "Kilo" Pugh; Thompson	Thompson	3:58
3.	"Alright"	King; Bruce Hornsby; Thompson	Thompson	3:33
4.	"U & I"	King; Thompson	Thompson	3:18
5.	"Hold Me"	King; Thompson	Thompson; Vada Nobles	3:44
6.	"Ain't No Sunshine"	Bill Withers	Thompson	2:59
7.	"You Can Get By"	King; Thompson	Thompson	4:52
8.	"E Melody"	King; Pugh; Thompson	Thompson; King^{[a]}	3:27
9.	"It Was You"	King	Thompson	3:38
10.	"Moon"	King	Thompson	4:36
11.	"Business Man"	King	Thompson	3:59
12.	"Never Be Lonely"	King	Thompson	3:50
13.	"Ride With Me"	King	Thompson	3:46
14.	"Walk in My Shoes (Remix)" (featuring Lupe Fiasco)	King; Drawz; McLeod; Sawyer; Thompson; Wasalu Muhammad Jaco	Thompson; King^{[a]}	3:50

Notes

- ^{^[a]} signifies a co-producer

== Charts ==
Chart (2007)	Peak position
US Heatseekers Albums (Billboard)	18
US Top R&B/Hip-Hop Albums (Billboard)	60
