= Grammy Award for Best Contemporary R&B Album =

Grammy award category for R&B

- Awarded for: quality contemporary R&B music albums
- Country: United States
- Presented by: National Academy of Recording Arts and Sciences
- First award: 2003
- Final award: 2011
- Website: grammy.com

The Grammy Award for Best Contemporary R&B Album was an honor presented at the Grammy Awards, a ceremony that was established in 1958 and originally called the Gramophone Awards, to recording artists for quality works on albums in the contemporary R&B music genre. Honors in several categories are presented at the ceremony annually by the National Academy of Recording Arts and Sciences of the United States to "honor artistic achievement, technical proficiency and overall excellence in the recording industry, without regard to album sales or chart position".

The award for Best Contemporary R&B Album, which recognizes R&B albums with more contemporary musical stylings, was first presented to Ashanti at the 45th Grammy Awards in 2003 for her self-titled debut album. Prior to the creation of this category, contemporary R&B albums were eligible for the more general category Best R&B Album. According to the category description guide for the 52nd Grammy Awards, the award is reserved for albums "containing at least 51% playing time of newly recorded contemporary R&B vocal tracks" which may also "incorporate production elements found in rap music". Award recipients included the producers, engineers, and/or mixers associated with the nominated work in addition to the recording artists.

Beyoncé holds the record for the most wins, with three (all of her first three solo albums have earned her the award). Usher is the only other artist to receive the award more than once. The award has been presented to artists from the United States each year to date. Beyoncé and Ne-Yo share the record for the most nominations, with three each. In addition, Beyoncé earned a nomination as a member of the group Destiny's Child for the album Destiny Fulfilled. Brandy, Chris Brown, Janet Jackson and R. Kelly share the record for the most nominations without a win, with two each.

From 2012, this category was discontinued as part of a major overhaul of the Grammy Award categories. Recordings in this category were shifted back to the Best R&B Album category.

== Recipients ==
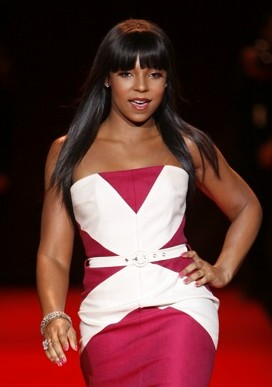
First award recipient Ashanti at the Red Dress Collection fashion show in 2008

| Year^{[I]} | Performing artist(s) | Work | Nominees | Ref. |
|---|---|---|---|---|
| 2003 | Ashanti | Ashanti | Brandy – Full Moon; Faith Evans – Faithfully; Floetry – Floetic; Meshell Ndegeocello – Cookie: The Anthropological Mixtape | |
| 2004 | Beyoncé | Dangerously in Love | Ashanti – Chapter II; Mary J. Blige – Love & Life; Anthony Hamilton – Comin' from Where I'm From; R. Kelly – Chocolate Factory | |
| 2005 | Usher | Confessions | Brandy – Afrodisiac; Janet Jackson – Damita Jo; Christina Milian – It's About Time; Mario Winans – Hurt No More | |
| 2006 | Mariah Carey | The Emancipation of Mimi | Amerie – Touch; Destiny's Child – Destiny Fulfilled; Mario – Turning Point; Omarion – O | |
| 2007 | Beyoncé | B'Day | Chris Brown – Chris Brown; Janet Jackson – 20 Y.O.; Kelis – Kelis Was Here; Ne-Yo – In My Own Words | |
| 2008 | Ne-Yo | Because of You | Akon – Konvicted; Keyshia Cole – Just like You; Fantasia – Fantasia; Emily King – East Side Story | |
| 2009 | Mary J. Blige | Growing Pains | J. Holiday – Back of My Lac'; Karina – First Love; Ne-Yo – Year of the Gentleman; Jazmine Sullivan – Fearless | |
| 2010 | Beyoncé | I Am... Sasha Fierce | Jamie Foxx – Intuition; Pleasure P – The Introduction of Marcus Cooper; Trey Songz – Ready; T-Pain – Three Ringz | |
| 2011 | Usher | Raymond v. Raymond | R. Kelly – Untitled; Chris Brown – Graffiti; Ryan Leslie – Transition; Janelle Monáe – The ArchAndroid | |

^{^[I]} Each year is linked to the article about the Grammy Awards held that year.

== See also ==
- List of Grammy Award categories
- List of R&B musicians
- Top R&B/Hip-Hop Albums
