= The Switch (Emily King album) =

Studio album by Emily King
- Released: June 26, 2015
- Length: 36:07
- Label: Making Music
- Producer: Jeremy Most

Emily King chronology
East Side Story (2007)	The Switch (2015)	Scenery (2019)

Singles from The Switch
- 1. "Distance" Released: April 30, 2014; 2. "The Animals" Released: May 13, 2015; 3. "BYIMM" Released: June 24, 2016

The Switch is the second studio album by American singer-songwriter Emily King. It was released by Making Music Records on June 26, 2015 in the United States. Featuring main production from Jeremy Most, it reached number 41 on the US Billboard Top R&B/Hip-Hop Albums chart.

== Track listing ==
The Switch – Standard edition
No.	Title	Writer(s)	Producer(s)	Length
1.	"Good Friend"	Emily King	Jeremy Most	2:38
2.	"The Animals"	King; Most	Most	3:45
3.	"Sleepwalker"	King	Most	3:19
4.	"Already There"	King	Most	3:09
5.	"The Switch"	King	Most	2:39
6.	"Aya"	King	Most	1:20
7.	"Distance"	King	Most	3:51
8.	"Out of the Clouds"	King	Most	4:20
9.	"Off Center"	King; Most	Most	4:22
10.	"Believer"	King	Most	3:09
11.	"For Them"	King	Most	3:38
Total length:				36:07

The Switch – Deluxe edition (bonus tracks)
No.	Title	Writer(s)	Producer(s)	Length
12.	"Focus"	King	Most	4:07
13.	"BYIMM"	King	Most	3:00
14.	"Sleepwalker" (Demo Version)	King	Most	2:56
15.	"At Night He Plays" (Demo Version)	King	Most	1:05
16.	"See You There"	King	Most	3:54
Total length:				51:09

== Charts ==
Chart (2015)	Peak position
US Heatseekers Albums (Billboard)	16
US Top R&B/Hip-Hop Albums (Billboard)	41
