= Joseph Lorge =

American sound engineer and music producer (born 1990)

- Born: 1990 (age 35–36)
- Education: University of California, Los Angeles
- Occupations: sound engineer and music producer
- Awards: 2026 Grammy Award for Best Engineered Album, Non-Classical
- Website: www.josephlorge.com

Joseph Lorge (born 1990) is an American sound engineer and music producer. He won the 2026 Grammy Award for Best Engineered Album, Non-Classical.

== Early life and education ==
Lorge was born in 1990 to Barry Lorge, a sports columnist for the San Diego Union, and Claudia (née Hanes), a homemaker. He has an older sister, Katie.

He began learning piano in third grade and guitar in middle school, and later taught himself mandolin. He attended Coronado School of the Arts, where he "started dabbling" in sound engineering. He graduated in 2008 and started at University of California, Los Angeles, studying ethnomusicology. While at UCLA he produced and performed with the student band Alto, playing guitar.

Lorge completed an internship at Tony Berg's Zeitgeist Studios in 2011, assisting with the production of Sun Midnight Sun by Sara Watkins. He then attended a term at Banff Centre for Arts and Creativity, after which he began working as a sound engineer.

== Career ==
Lorge's first commercial engineering credit was on Slowmotionary, Ethan Gruska's debut solo album. He is a regular collaborator of artist and producer Blake Mills. Gabriel Kahane called him "indispensable to my process as a studio artist". Other artists he has worked with have included Chris Thile, Jack Johnson, Phoebe Bridgers, Christian Lee Hutson, and Perfume Genius.

As of 2024 Lorge worked out of Sound City Studios in Los Angeles. He uses Pro Tools and Yamaha NS-10s for audio engineering.

== Awards ==
- Winner, 2026 Grammy Award for Best Engineered Album, Non-Classical, for That Wasn't a Dream
- Nominee, 2026 Grammy Award for Best Engineered Album, Non-Classical, for For Melancholy Brunettes (& Sad Women)
- Nominee, 2024 Grammy Award for Best Engineered Album, Non-Classical, for Multitudes
- Nominee, 2022 Grammy Award for Best Engineered Album, Non-Classical, for Notes with Attachments
- Nominee, 2018 Grammy Award for Best Engineered Album, Non-Classical, for No Shape
Artists Joseph Lorge has worked with

Phoebe Bridgers

Punch Brothers

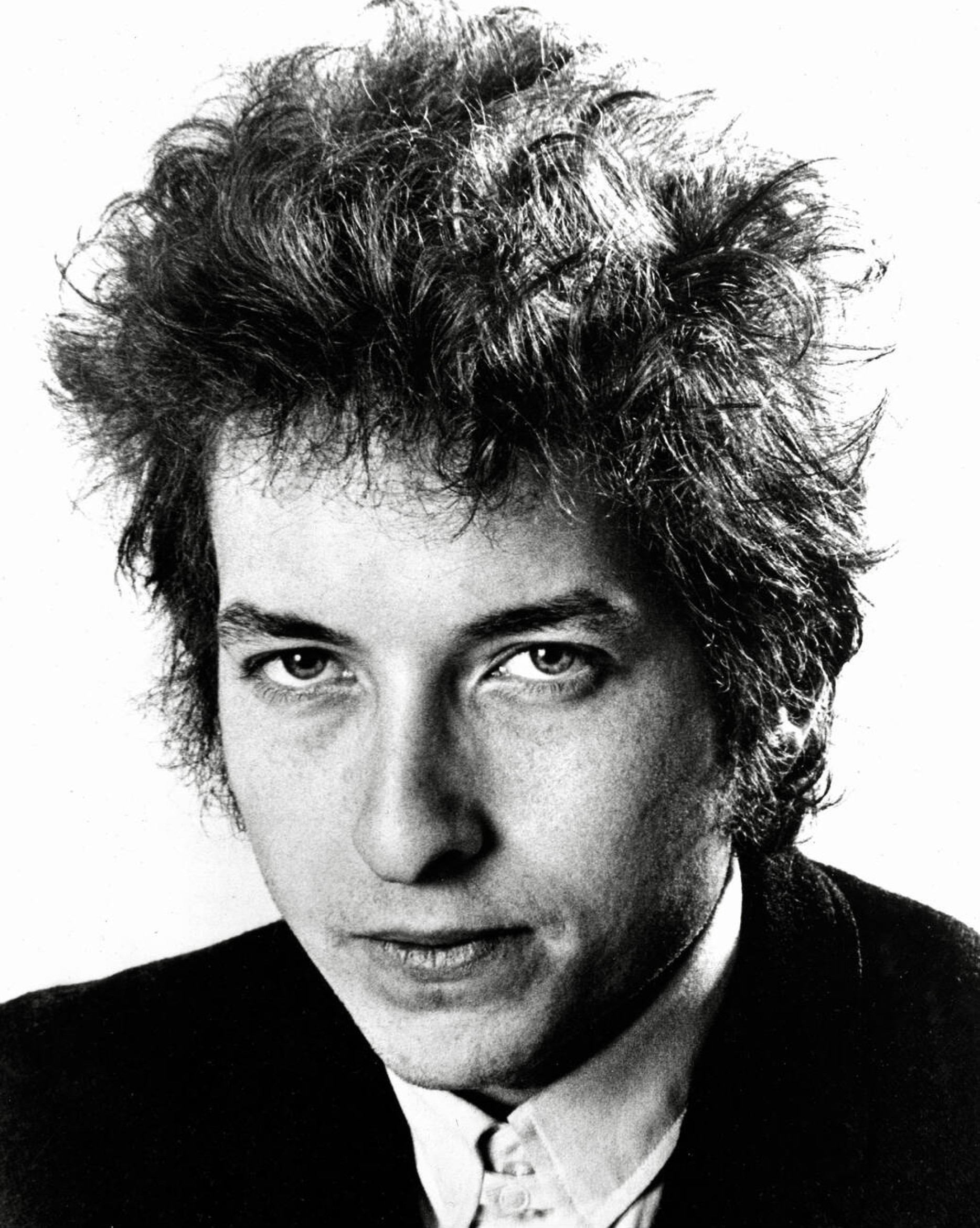
Bob Dylan

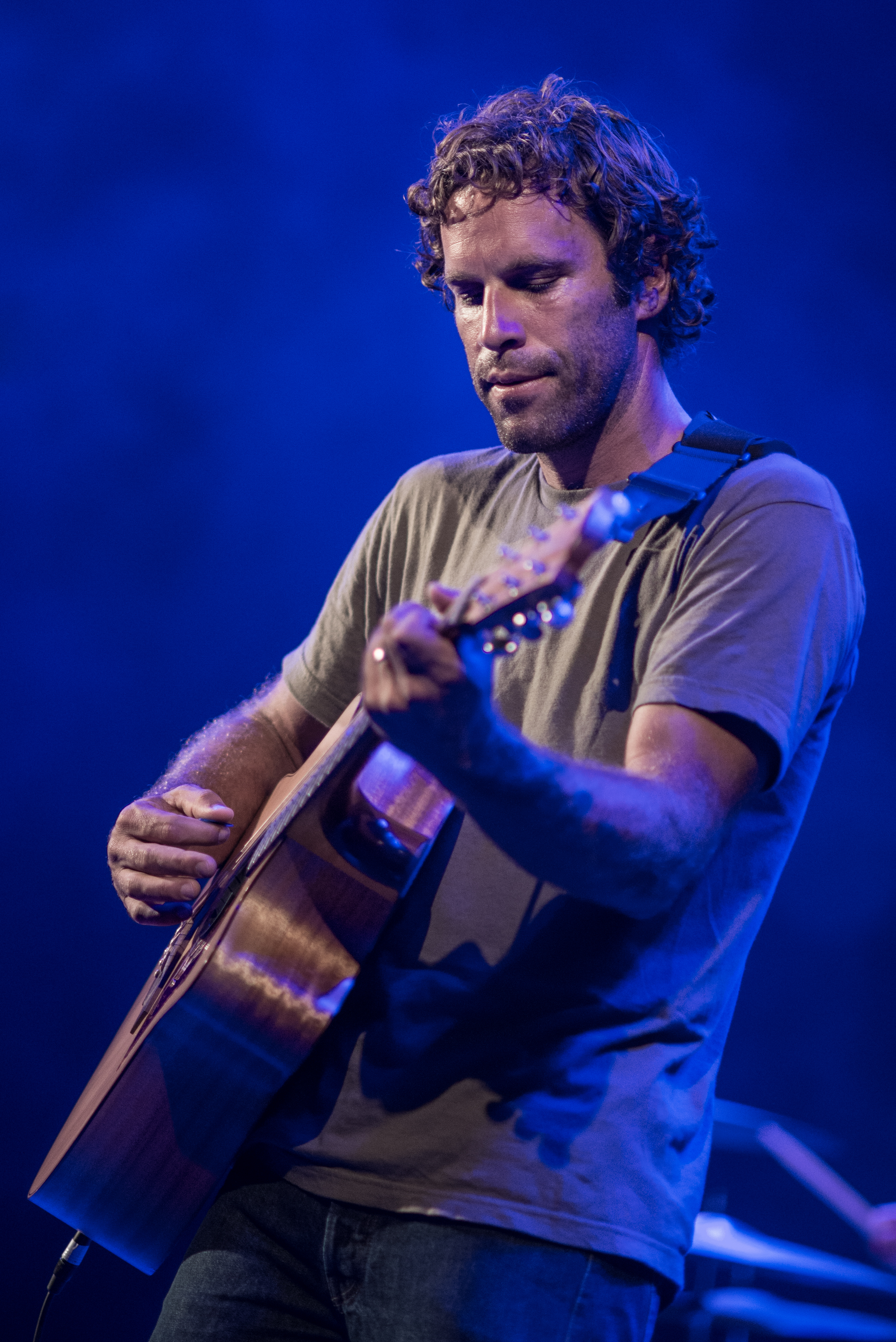
Jack Johnson

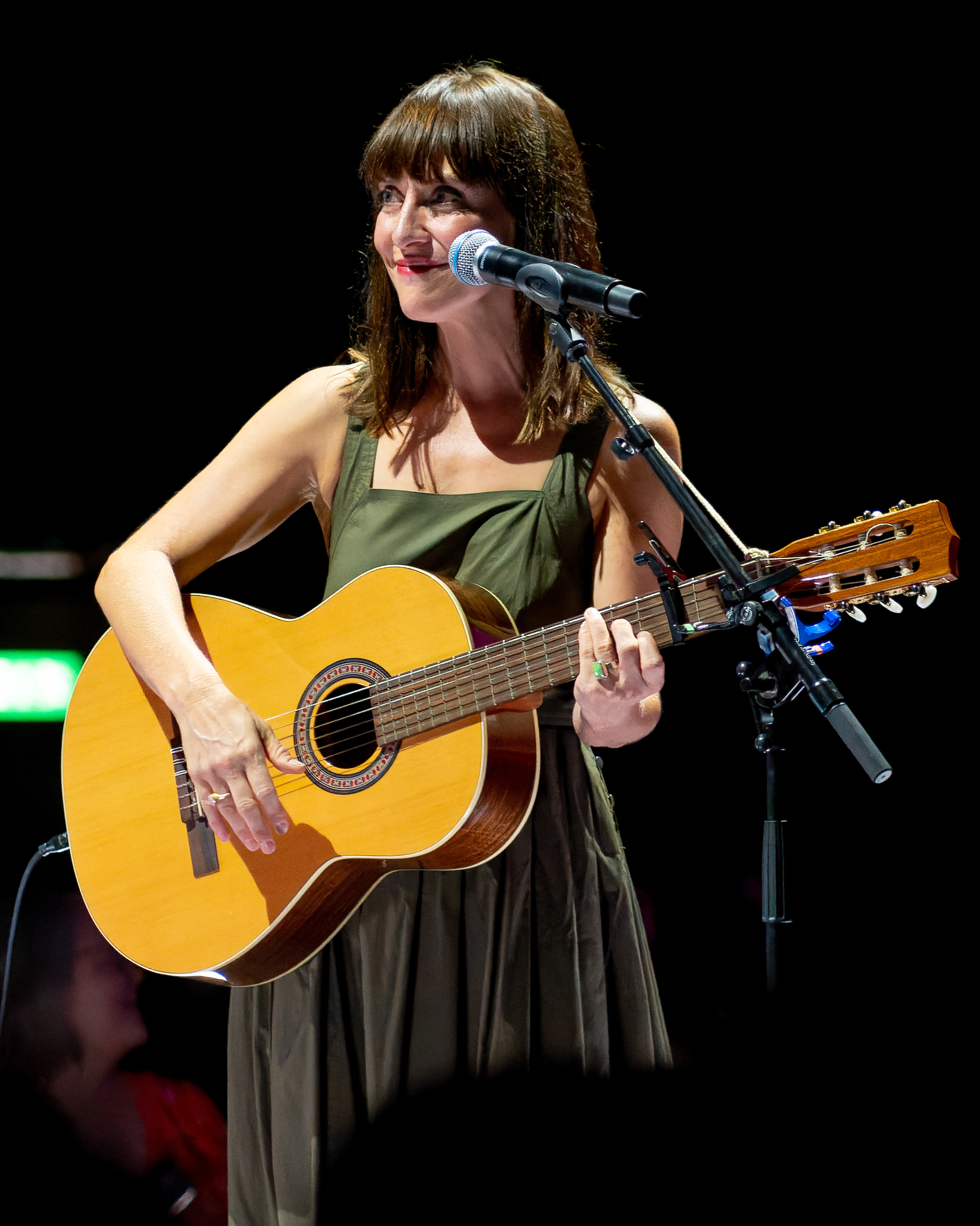
Feist

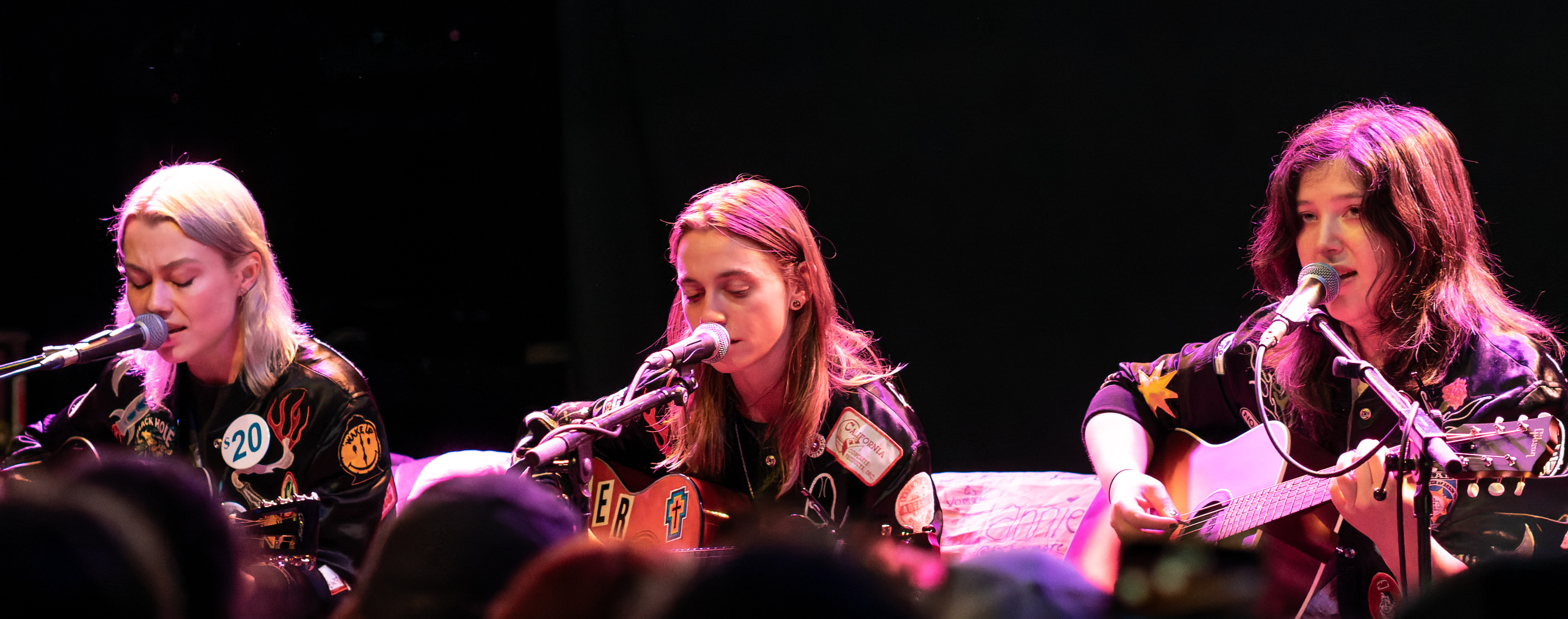
Boygenius

== Selected discography ==
Artist	Album	Year	Reference
Punch Brothers	The Unsung Adventures of Punch Brothers	2026	
Maya Hawke	Maitreya Corso	2026	
Roomful of Teeth / Gabriel Kahane	Elevator Songs	2026	
Chris Thile	Bach Sonatas & Partitas vol. 2	2025	
Hand Habits	Blue Reminder	2025	
Pino Palladino / Blake Mills	That Wasn't A Dream	2025	
Japanese Breakfast	For Melancholy Brunettes (& Sad Women)	2025	
Perfume Genius	Glory	2025	
The Weather Station	Humanhood	2025	
Christian Lee Hutson	Paradise Pop. 10	2024	
Blake Mills	Jelly Road	2023	
Feist	Multitudes	2023	
	Aurora (Daisy Jones & the Six album)	2023	
Perfume Genius	Ugly Season	2022	
Christian Lee Hutson	Quitters	2022	
Jack Johnson	Meet the Moonlight	2022	
Marcus Mumford	self-titled	2022	
Gabriel Kahane	Magnificent Bird	2022	
Pino Palladino / Blake Mills	Notes with Attachments	2021	
William the Conqueror	Maverick Thinker	2021	
The Fearless Flyers	Tailwinds	2020	
Phantom Planet	Devastator	2020	
Bob Dylan	Rough and Rowdy Ways	2020	
Perfume Genius	Set My Heart on Fire Immediately	2020	
Blake Mills	Mutable Set	2020	
Phoebe Bridgers	Punisher	2020	
Christian Lee Hutson	Beginners	2020	
Ethan Gruska	En Garde	2020	
Blake Mills	Look	2018	
Gabriel Kahane	Book of Travelers	2018	
Boygenius	Boygenius	2018	
Perfume Genius	No Shape	2017	
Ethan Gruska	Slowmotionary	2017	
