= Scenery (Emily King album) =

Studio album by Emily King
- Released: February 1, 2019
- Genres: R&B; pop; post-disco; dream pop; neo soul
- Length: 44:00
- Label: ATO
- Producer: Jeremy Most

Emily King chronology
The Switch (2015)	Scenery (2019)	Change of Scenery (2019)

Singles from Scenery
- 1. "Remind Me" Released: October 3, 2018; 2. "Look At Me Now" Released: November 5, 2018; 3. "Look At Me Now" Released: January 15, 2020

Scenery is the third studio album by American singer-songwriter Emily King. It was released by ATO Records on February 1, 2019, making it her first on the label. Following 2015's The Switch, King reunited with producer Jeremy Most to work on the album. Scenery peaked at number six on the US Billboard Heatseekers Albums. The song "Look at Me Now" gained a nomination for Best R&B Song and Best Engineered Album, Non-Classical at the 2020 Grammy Awards.

== Composition ==
Scenery is a pop, R&B, neo soul, dream pop, post-disco album with touches of gospel, jazz, and tropical music. King recorded the album in a studio build by her and Jeremy Most in a garage in the Catskill Mountains. The move from her urban life in New York City to the Catskills is reflected in the album's title, as King felt she needed a "change of scenery". The lyrics of album closer "Go Back" also touch on this, with the line "so I lick my wounds, I got nothing to lose, I’m heading out on my own".

Much of the album is about King getting over an ex while finding new love. "Look at Me Now" shows King taunting her lover with "joy and spite reinforced with lively xylophone" and Queen-inspired funk guitar. "Running" is a gospel-inspired ballad where King "yearns to forgive and accept herself." "Can't Hold Me" features South Asian percussion, guitar licks and "velvety" synths The quiet storm song "Blue Light" sees King "surrounded by waves of backing vocals" and "swelling Disney-like strings" "Forgiveness" is an electro-ballad that "glides with the same restraint and class as Sade’s most rewarding songs". "Remind Me" is an electro-R&B song that "recalls classic era Madonna or Whitney Houston." "Teach You" is a retro-soul and calypso song that is "playful and tender at once" as King gives her lover lessons on how to treat her better. The acoustic jazz of "Caliche" tells "a story about being lost in life, paired with Most’s exotic production: complex rhythms, hushed vocals and whoops and hollers in the distance, like the sombre flip side to Lionel Richie’s All Night Long." "2nd Guess" evokes Parade-era Prince as King sings about being "free, lost in a sudden romantic diversion, attesting before sheets of noise evoking blinding sunlight that 'Life is always sweeter when there's no regrets.'"

== Critical reception ==
Professional ratings
Aggregate scores
Source	Rating
Metacritic	76/100
Review scores
Source	Rating
AllMusic	4/5 stars
Exclaim!	7/10
Now	4/5 stars
Pitchfork	7.7/10
Pop Magazine	4.5/5

Scenery received generally positive reviews from contemporary music critics. At Metacritic, which assigns a normalized rating out of 100 to reviews from mainstream critics, the album received an average score of 76, based on eight reviews. Andy Kellman of AllMusic rated the album four out of five stars. He wrote that the album "refines the seemingly instinctive and contemporary hybrid sound of 2015's The Switch with more mature pop informed by traditional singer/songwriters, classic R&B into the post-disco era, the high-tech end of mid-'80s top 40 radio, and even a little gospel. All elements are recombined while being neither overtly retro nor wholly allegiant to anything other than durable songcraft (with the occasional sonic flourish)."

Pitchfork's Maggie Lange foung that the "album maps life's changes to sleek, vibrant R&B that's packed with 1980s soundtrack flourishes and big moments; it's the perfect frame for her extraordinary voice." Ryan B. Patrick from Exclaim! found that "with Scenery, [King] makes a statement [...] The 12-track project comes ever-so-close to its intended level of sublime, yet plays things on the safe side: pleasant, powerful, precise. It waves over listening with its earnestness — soothing the consciousness rather than expanding it. It's a clear articulation of King's mastery and intent; Scenery is musically sound, entrancing and implores that you take a look." Chaka V. Grier noted that "with her sparkling 80s-R&B-evoking voice, King sounds like she emanates music rather than sings it [...] In a lesser writer's hands, love songs could convey hackneyed lyrics about desire and heartbreak, but not King. She adds magic to the mundane, cracking it open to reveal multifaceted nuances: longing, pleasure, resentment, jealousy and also self-love."

=== Accolades ===
Accolades for Scenery
Publication	List	Work	Ranking	Ref
Pop Magazine	Best Albums of 2019	Scenery	18	

== Track listing ==
All tracks are written by Emily King and Jeremy Most and produced by Jeremy Most.

Scenery track listing
No.	Title	Length
1.	"Remind Me"	4:03
2.	"Teach You"	4:07
3.	"Can't Hold Me"	4:27
4.	"Look at Me Now"	3:12
5.	"Caliche"	3:53
6.	"Blue Light"	3:47
7.	"Forgiveness"	3:47
8.	"Running"	3:47
9.	"Interlude (What Love Is)"	1:43
10.	"Marigolds"	3:02
11.	"2nd Guess"	3:53
12.	"Go Back"	4:14
Total length:		44:00

== Charts ==
Chart performance for Scenery
Chart (2019)	Peak position
US Top Current Album Sales (Billboard)	86
US Heatseekers Albums (Billboard)	6
US Independent Albums (Billboard)	14

== Change of Scenery ==
Change of Scenery

EP by Emily King
- Released: October 11, 2019
- Length: 19:59
- Label: ATO
- Producer: Jeremy Most

Emily King chronology
Scenery (2019)	Change of Scenery (2019)	Sides (2020)

Change of Scenery is a remix EP by American singer-songwriter Emily King, featuring remixes of songs from her third studio album Scenery. It was released on October 11, 2019 by ATO Records.

=== Track listing ===
Change of Scenery track listing
No.	Title	Length
1.	"Forgiveness" (Wynne Bennett Remix)	3:11
2.	"Can't Hold Me" (Machinedrum Remix)	4:11
3.	"Blue Light" (Taylor McFerrin Remix)	3:27
4.	"Go Back" (Wantigga Remix)	3:32
5.	"Can't Hold Me" (King Britt Anthem Mix)	5:38
Total length:		19:59

== In popular culture ==
Can't Hold Me appears in the Steven Universe Future episode "Bismuth Casual".

== Instrumental album ==
Scenery (Instrumentals), An album of instrumental versions of all the album's tracks (excluding "Interlude (What Love Is)") was released on June 19, 2020.
