= Little Lost Girls Blues =

Little Girl Lost Blues

Studio album by N'Dambi
- Released: 1999
- Recorded: 1996–1998
- Genre: Neo soul
- Label: Cheeky I Productions
- Producer: Madukwu Chinwah

Little Lost Girls Blues is the debut album by the American neo soul singer N'Dambi, released in 1999. N'Dambi sold 50,000 copies of the album through her own label, Cheeky I Productions.

== Critical reception ==
Exclaim! thought that "while laced with the loping bass lines and so-called 'neo-soul' overtones one might expect, it’s the overall durability and consistency that encourages repeat spins." Vibe wrote that the singer "maintains a somber tempo and alto pitch throughout the majority of the album, but she breaks out the funk on 'Lonely Woman'."

== Track listing ==
1. "Picture This" - 2:37
2. "Deep" - 4:14
3. "Rain" - 3:52
4. "What's Wrong With You" - 4:22
5. "The Meeting" - 5:58
6. "See Ya In My Dreams" - 5:16
7. "Lonely Woman" - 5:50
8. "Soul From The Abyss" - 4:57
9. "The Sunshine" - 3:48
10. "Can This Be Love" - 5:52
11. "I Think For Sure" - 5:25
12. "Broke My Heart" - 4:22
13. "Crazy World" - 4:42
14. "Lonely Woman (Interlude)" - 7:37
