= Cassidy Turbin =

American record producer, engineer and musician

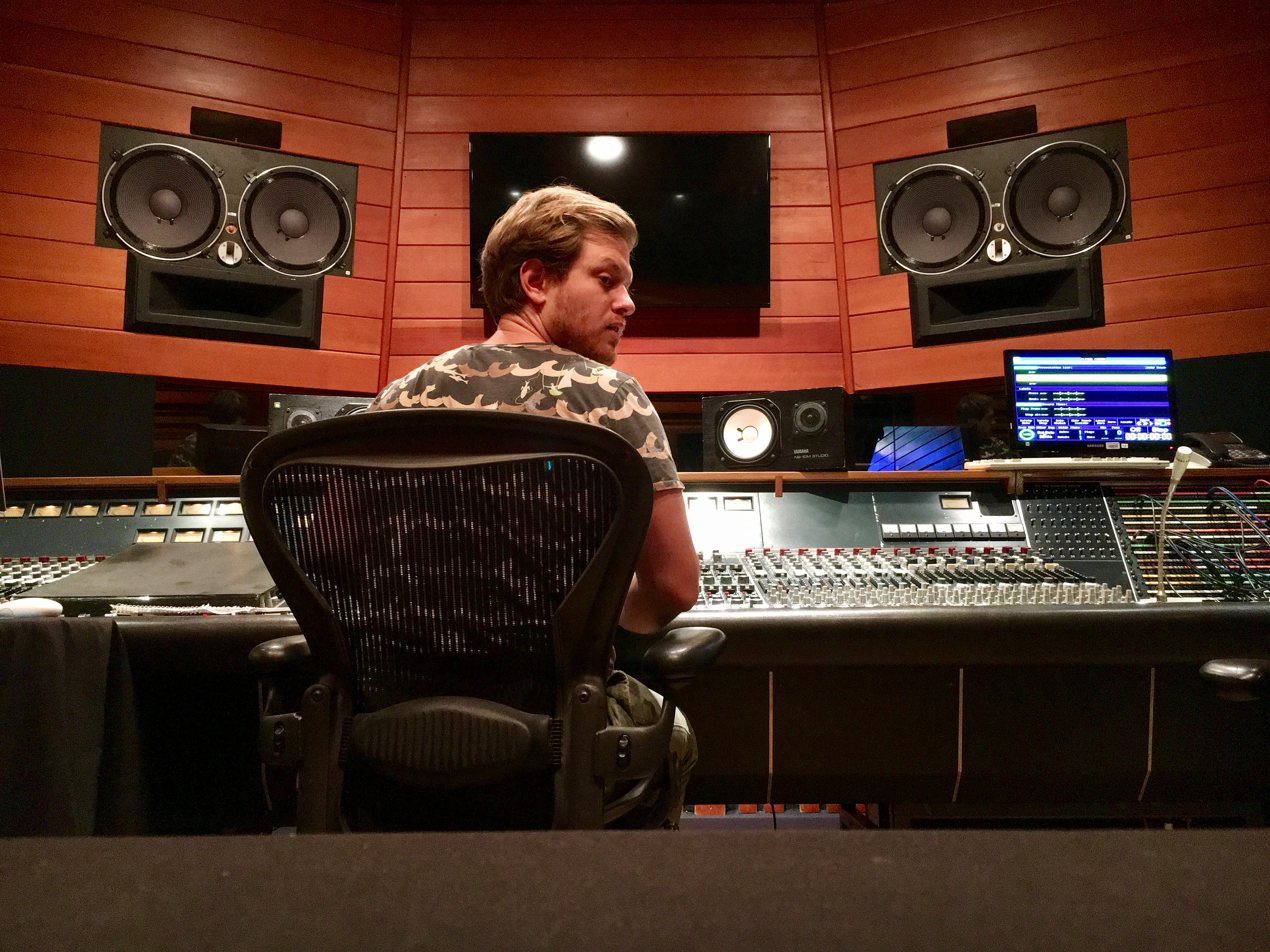
- Born: Los Angeles, California
- Occupations: Audio Engineer, Producer, Musician
- Website: https://www.cassidyturbin.com

Cassidy Turbin is an American 5-time Grammy Award-winning record producer, engineer and musician based in Los Angeles, California. He has worked extensively with numerous singers, songwriters and multi-instrumentalists.

Turbin has worked with various artists, such as Beck, Childish Gambino, Charlotte Gainsbourg, Bat for Lashes, Keyon Harrold, MC Lyte, Michelle Branch, Jon Brion, Dwight Yoakam, Cadence Kid, The Chemical Brothers and Thurston Moore.
