= Dylan Dresdow =

American audio engineer

- Also known as: 3-D
- Born: Dylan Charles Dresdow
- Origin: Los Angeles, California, U.S.
- Occupation: Audio engineer
- Website: papervustudios.com

Dylan Charles Dresdow is an American audio engineer and mixer. He has mixed recordings for music industry acts including Prince, Michael Jackson, Madonna, Usher, Black Eyed Peas, Nas, Britney Spears, Ice Cube, Kanye West, the Wu Tang Clan, Missy Elliott, Christina Aguilera, Ricky Martin, Rihanna, and Chris Brown, among others.

In 2008, Dresdow won an Emmy Award for his work on will.i.am's "Yes We Can" music video. In 2009, he won a Grammy Award for his work on the Black Eyed Peas album The E.N.D. A graduate of Full Sail University, Dresdow was inducted into the school's Hall of Fame in 2013.
