= Emily King =

American musician (born 1985)

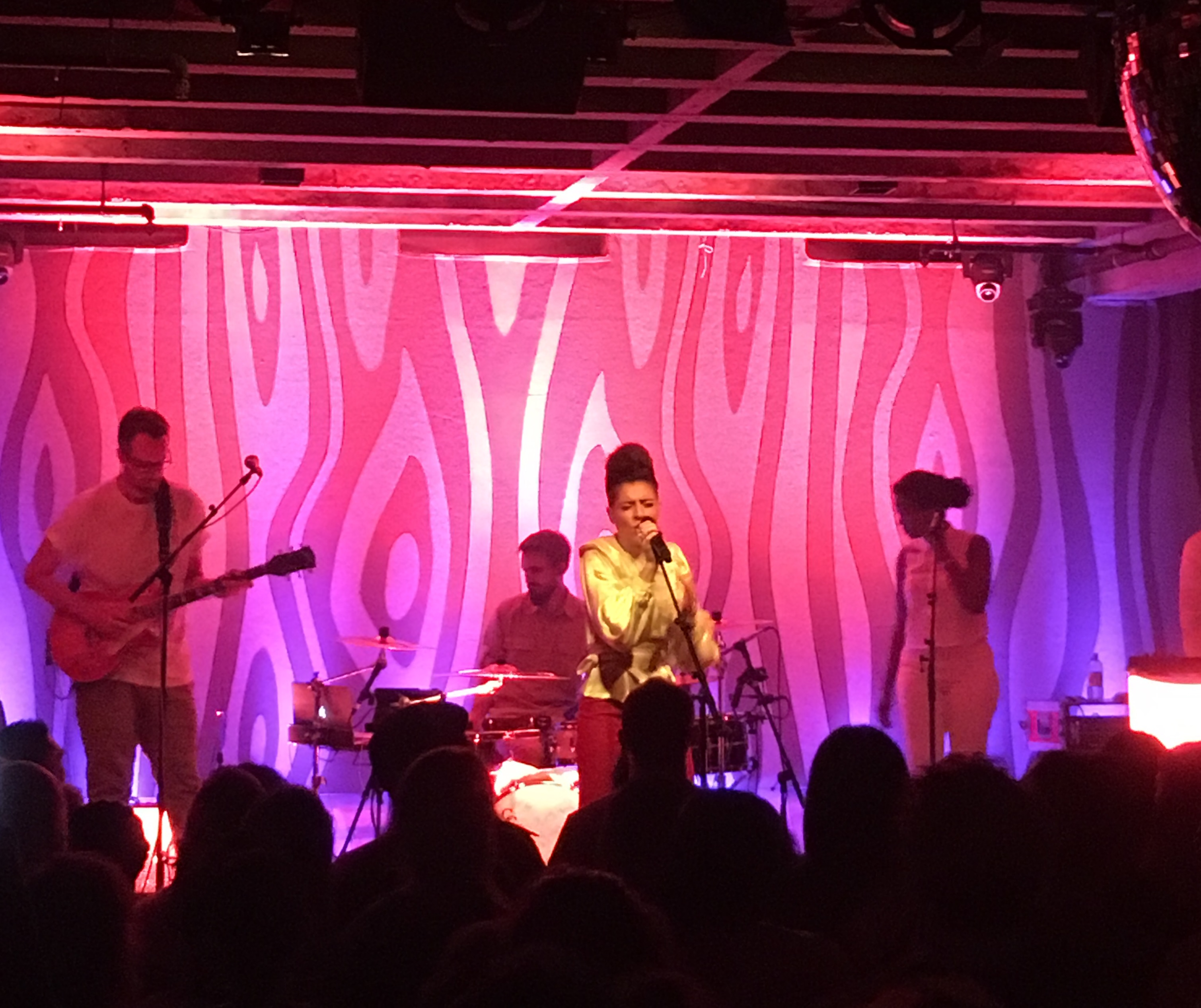
- King performing in Portland, Oregon, August 2016

Background information
- Born: July 10, 1985 (age 41)
- Origin: New York City, United States
- Genres: R&B; soul; pop
- Occupations: Singer, songwriter
- Years active: 2004–present
- Labels: J; Making Music; ATO
- Partner: Jeremy Most (2007-2021)
- Website: emilykingmusic.com

Emily King (born Emily Cowings; July 10, 1985) is an American singer and songwriter. She started her career in 2004 and her first album East Side Story was released in August 2007. In December 2007, she was a Grammy Award nominee for Best Contemporary R&B Album. In 2019, she was nominated for Best R&B Song for "Look at Me Now" and her album Scenery was nominated for Best Engineered Album, Non-Classical. In 2020, King was nominated again, for Best R&B Performance with her song "See Me".

== Biography ==
Born in 1985 in New York City, King grew up in a small apartment on the Lower East Side. Her parents, Marion Cowings and Kim Kalesti, were a singing duo who performed and traveled regularly taking her and her older brother with them. At the age of 16, King left high school after earning her GED to pursue her music career. She began playing shows in restaurants and venues around New York City, including CBGB and The Bitter End.

== Career ==
King signed her first record deal with J Records in 2004 and appeared on Nas's 2004 album Street's Disciple credited as simply "Emily". Her first album East Side Story was released in August 2007. It received a Grammy nomination for Best Contemporary R&B Album of the Year. After leaving the label in 2008, King continued her work independently with producer Jeremy Most. She self-recorded her follow-up EP Seven in her home, released in July 2011. Throughout this time, King toured domestically and internationally with many artists including Nas, John Legend, Floetry, Alicia Keys, Chaka Khan, Erykah Badu, and Maroon 5.

In 2012, King was awarded the Holly Prize (a tribute to the legacy of Buddy Holly) from The Songwriters Hall of Fame for recognition of the "all-in songwriter" whose work exhibits the qualities of Holly’s music: true, great and original. In the fall, King was invited by Emeli Sandé to open for her UK tour playing sold out shows in five cities including at The Royal Albert Hall in London. King collaborated with José James on his album No Beginning No End in 2013 and can be heard on the tracks "Heaven on the Ground" and the acoustic version of "Come to My Door". In 2014, King performed as an opening act for Sara Bareilles' Little Black Dress tour.

King's second studio album, The Switch, was self-released by her own label, Making Music Records, on June 26, 2015. The Wall Street Journal remarked that the album is "a tasteful collection of eleven songs that showcase King’s distinctive voice".

She signed with the independent label ATO Records in 2017 and with them released her third studio album, Scenery, on 1 February 2019.

In late 2019, King once again performed as an opening act for Sara Bareilles in her Amidst The Chaos Tour.

In 2019, King helped to compose "Being Human", the ending theme song for the Cartoon Network animated series Steven Universe Future, which she sang. Her song "Can't Hold Me" was also used in an episode of the series.

King released her fourth studio album, Sides, on January 17, 2020. The album features acoustic takes on her previous songs, and includes a guest appearance by Sara Bareilles on the track "Teach You." In response to racial unrest in the summer of 2020, King released the song "See Me" in August. The song was nominated for Best R&B Performance in the 63rd Annual Grammy Awards.

King appeared on stream with Marc Rebillet on March 21, 2021, as his first ever guest performer.

King's Tiny Desk Concert went online on November 3, 2025. The set list: "Distance", "Georgia", "Down", "This Year". and "Special Occasion".

== Discography ==
=== Studio albums ===
Title	Details	Peak chart positions			
Title	Details	US Curr.	US R&B HH	US Heat	US Indie
East Side Story	Released: August 28, 2007; Label: J; Formats: CD, digital download	—	60	18	—
The Switch	Released: June 26, 2015; Label: Making Music; Formats: CD, LP, digital download	—	41	16	—
Scenery	Released: February 1, 2019; Label: ATO; Formats: CD, LP, digital download	86	—	6	14
Sides	Released: January 17, 2020; Label: Making Music, ATO; Formats: CD, digital download	—	—	—	—
Special Occasion	Released: May 5, 2023; Label: ATO; Formats: LP, CD, digital download	79	—	—	—

=== EPs ===
Title	Details
East Side Story (Sampler)	Released: 2006; Label: self-released; Formats: CD
Seven	Released: July 12, 2011; Label: self-released; Formats: CD, LP, Digital download
Emily King on Audiotree Live	Released: November 15, 2015; Label: Audiotree Music; Formats: Digital download
Change of Scenery (Remix EP)	Released: October 11, 2019; Label: ATO; Formats: Digital download
Spotify Singles	Released: July 22, 2020; Label: ATO; Formats: Streaming

=== Instrumental albums ===
Title	Details
The Seven EP Instrumentals	Released: 23 April 2012; Label: Self-released; Formats: Digital download
Scenery (Instrumentals)	Released: 19 June 2020; Label: ATO; Formats: Digital download

=== Singles ===
==== As lead artist ====
Title	Year	Peak chart positions		Album
Title	Year	US R&B/ HH	US Adult R&B	Album
"Walk in My Shoes" (with Lupe Fiasco)	2007	74	22	East Side Story
"U & I"	2008	—	26	East Side Story
"Ordinary Heart"	2012	—	—	Non-album single
"The Animals"	2013	—	—	The Switch
"Distance"	2014	—	—	The Switch
"BYIMM"	2016	—	—	The Switch
"Crush (Amazon Original)"	2017	—	—	Non-album single
"Remind Me"	2018	—	—	Scenery
"Look at Me Now"	2018	—	—	Scenery
"Can't Hold Me"	2019	—	—	Scenery
"Incredible Manage Question"	2019	—	—	Non-album single
"Look At Me Now (Acoustic)"	2019	—	—	Sides
"Radio (Acoustic)"	2020	—	—	Sides
"Teach You (Acoustic)" (featuring Sara Bareilles)	2020	—	—	Sides
"Being Human" (Theme From Steven Universe Future)	2020	—	—	Steven Universe Future (Original Soundtrack)
"See Me"	2020	—	—	Non-album singles
"First Time"	2021	—	—	Non-album singles
"This Year"	2022	—	—	Special Occasion
"Medal"	2023	—	—	Special Occasion
"False Start"	2023	—	—	Special Occasion
"Special Occasion"	2023	—	—	Special Occasion
"Bad Memory" (with Norah Jones)	2023	—	—	Norah Jones Is Playing Along

==== As featured artist ====
Title	Year	Album
"What's Never Gone" (Jake and Abe featuring Emily King)	2021	Non-album single
"What Love Can do" (Robert Glasper featuring Emily King)	2023	Run the World, Season 2

=== Guest appearances ===
Title	Year	Other artist(s)	Album
"Take a Walk"	2008	Tame Waipara	Leaving Paradise
"Heaven on the Ground"	2012	José James	No Beginning No End
"What Must I Do"	2012	Selan	Space Flight
"Stay Slow"	2013	Tame Waipara	Fill Up the Silence
"Decisions"	2014	Taylor McFerrin	Early Riser
"Good Enough"	2019	Kraz	Telescope
"That's the Way Life Goes"	2019	Hannah Georgas	Imprints
"Georgia - J Most Remix"	2021	Brittany Howard, Jeremy Most	Jaime (Reimagined)
"If I Can't Have You"	2021	Sara Bareilles	Amidst the Chaos: Live from the Hollywood Bowl
"Miracles"	2021	Benny Sings, Peter CottonTale	Music
"Lucky"	2021	Jason Mraz	Look for the Good (Deluxe Edition)
"Invitation"	2022	Robert Glasper	Black Radio III (Supreme Edition)

== Awards and nominations ==
Year	Award	Category	Work	Result
2008	Grammy Award	Best Contemporary R&B Album	East Side Story	Nominated
2020	Grammy Award	Best R&B Song	"Look at Me Now"	Nominated
2021	Grammy Award	Best R&B Performance	"See Me"	Nominated
2024	Grammy Award	Best R&B Album	Special Occasion	Nominated

== Tours ==
=== Headlining ===
- The Switch Tour (2015–16)
- You and I Tour (2017)
- Scenery Tour (2019)
- Ever After Tour (2021–22)

=== Supporting ===
- Hands All Over Tour (supporting Maroon 5) (2011)
- Our Version of Events Tour (supporting Emeli Sandé) (2012–13)
- Amidst the Chaos Tour (supporting Sara Bareilles) (2019)
