= Perfume Genius discography =

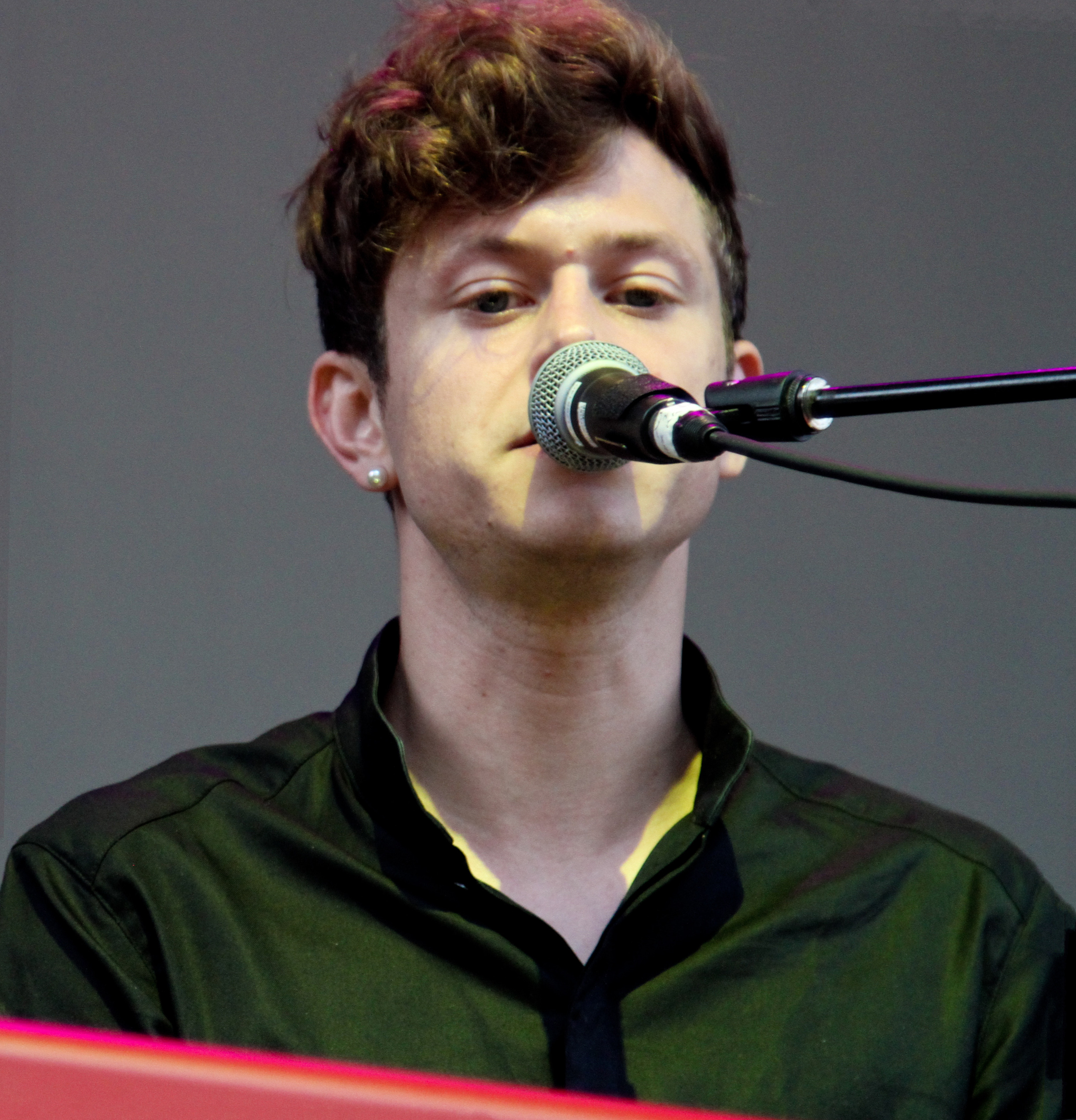
- Perfume Genius in 2012
- Studio albums: 7
- EPs: 1
- Singles: 13
- Music videos: 13

American musician Perfume Genius has released seven studio albums, one extended play, 13 singles and 13 music videos to date. Mike Hadreas began his music career under the Perfume Genius moniker in 2008 when he set up his MySpace page. Two years later, he released his debut album, Learning. He has released four albums since; Put Your Back N 2 It in 2012, Too Bright in 2014, No Shape in 2017, and Set My Heart on Fire Immediately in 2020. All of his albums have been released by Matador Records and received critical acclaim according to Metacritic. No Shape and the song "Queen" have both appeared in Pitchfork's decade-end lists for the 2010s. In 2020, he had his first song to chart on the Adult Alternative Songs chart with "On the Floor".

== Albums ==
=== Studio albums ===
List of studio albums with selected details and chart positions
Title	Details	Peak positions									
Title	Details	US	US Indie	ARIA Hit.	BEL (FL)	BEL (WA)	IRL	NZ Heat	POR	SCO	UK
Learning	Released: June 22, 2010; Label: Matador, Organs	—	—	—	41	—	—	—	—	—	—
Put Your Back N 2 It	Released: February 21, 2012; Label: Matador	— (Note: Put Your Back N 2 It did not enter the US Billboard 200 but did peak at number 23 on the Heatseekers Albums chart.)	—	—	19	—	73	—	—	—	—
Too Bright	Released: September 23, 2014; Label: Matador	83	19	20	26	64	—	—	—	75	77
No Shape	Released: May 5, 2017; Label: Matador	185	13	12	30	116	90	9	40	80	96
Set My Heart on Fire Immediately	Released: May 15, 2020; Label: Matador	— (Note: Set My Heart on Fire Immediately did not enter the US Billboard 200 but did peak at number 24 on the Top Album Sales chart.)	34	—	21	—	—	—	39	19	— (Note: "Set My Heart on Fire Immediately" did not enter the UK Albums Chart, but peaked at number 16 on the UK Albums Sales Chart.)
Ugly Season	Released: June 17, 2022; Label: Matador	— (Note: Ugly Season did not enter the US Billboard 200, but peaked at number 72 on the US Billboard Current Album Sales Chart.)	—	—	—	—	—	—	—	—	— (Note: "Ugly Season" did not enter the UK Albums Chart, but peaked at number 38 on the UK Album Downloads Chart.)
Glory	Released: March 28, 2025; Label: Matador	— (Note: Glory did not enter the US Billboard 200, but peaked at number 36 on the US Billboard Current Album Sales Chart.)	—	—	82	—	—	—	—	42	— (Note: "Glory" did not enter the UK Albums Chart, but peaked at number 31 on the UK Albums Sales Chart.)
"—" denotes a recording that did not chart or was not released in that territory.

=== Remix albums ===
Title	Details
Immediately Remixes	Released: March 12, 2021; Label: Matador; Format: Digital download, streaming, LP

== Extended plays ==
- Reshaped (2018)

== Singles ==
=== As lead artist ===
List of singles as lead artist, with selected chart positions
Title	Year	Peak chart positions			Album
Title	Year	US AAA	BEL (FL) Tip	NZ Hot	Album
"Mr. Peterson"	2010	—	—	—	Learning
"All Waters"	2011	—	—	—	Put Your Back N 2 It
"Hood"	2012	—	—	—	Put Your Back N 2 It
"Dark Parts"	2012	—	—	—	Put Your Back N 2 It
"Take Me Home"	2012	—	—	—	Put Your Back N 2 It
"Queen"	2014	—	—	—	Too Bright
"Grid"	2014	—	—	—	Too Bright
"Slip Away"	2017	—	—	—	No Shape
"Go Ahead"	2017	—	—	—	No Shape
"Eye in the Wall"	2019	—	—	—	Ugly Season
"Describe"	2020	—	— (Note: "Describe" did not enter the Ultratop 50, but charted as an "extra tip" on the Flemish Ultratip chart.)	—	Set My Heart on Fire Immediately
"On the Floor"	2020	32	— (Note: "On the Floor" did not enter the Ultratop 50, but charted as an "extra tip" on the Flemish Ultratip chart.)	—	Set My Heart on Fire Immediately
"Pop Song"	2022	—	—	—	Ugly Season
"It's a Mirror"	2025	—	—	—	Glory
"No Front Teeth" (featuring Aldous Harding)	2025	—	—	10	Glory
"Clean Heart"	2025	—	—	—	Glory
"Natural High"	2026	—	—	—	—
"—" denotes singles that did not chart or were not released

=== As featured artist ===
List of singles as featured artist, with selected chart positions
Title	Year	Peak chart positions						Album
Title	Year	US DL	US Alt. DL	US Rock DL	AUS DL	BEL (WA) Tip	FRA	Album
"I Think I Knew" (Cate Le Bon featuring Perfume Genius)	2013	—	—	—	—	—	—	Mug Museum
"Jonathan" (Christine and the Queens featuring Perfume Genius)	2015	—	—	—	—	26	120	Christine and the Queens
"Spitting Off the Edge of the World" (Yeah Yeah Yeahs featuring Perfume Genius)	2022	15	2	1	21	—	—	Cool It Down
"—" denotes a recording that did not chart or was not released in that territory.

== Other charted songs ==
List of other charted songs, with selected chart positions
Title	Year	Peak chart positions		Album
Title	Year	US Alt DL	BEL (FL) Tip	Album
"Normal Song"	2012	20	—	Put Your Back N 2 It
"Jason"	2020	—	43	Set My Heart on Fire Immediately
"—" denotes a recording that did not chart or was not released in that territory.

== Music videos ==
List of music videos, showing year released and directors
Title	Year	Director
"Lookout, Lookout"	2010	Patrick Sher
"Hood"	2012	Winston H. Case
"Take Me Home"	2012	Patrick Sher
"Dark Parts"	2013	Winston H. Case
"Queen"	2014	Cody Critcheloe
"Grid"	2014	Charlotte Rutherford
"Fool"	2014	Charlotte Rutherford
"Slip Away"	2017	Andrew Thomas Huang
"Die 4 You"	2017	Floria Sigismondi
"Wreath"	2017	
"Not for Me"	2018	Mike Hadreas
"Describe"	2020	Mike Hadreas
"On the Floor"	2020	Mike Hadreas

== Remixes ==
Title	Year	Artist	Ref.
"Good Ones" (Perfume Genius Remix)	2021	Charli XCX	
