= Blue Reminder =

Studio album by Hand Habits
- Released: August 22, 2025
- Studio: Tropico (Los Angeles); Sound City; Sequoia; Sony and Shure
- Genre: Indie folk
- Length: 46:17
- Label: Fat Possum
- Producer: Meg Duffy; Joseph Lorge

Hand Habits chronology
Fun House + Blueprints (2022)	Blue Reminder (2025)

Singles from Blue Reminder
- 1. "Wheel of Change" Released: June 4, 2025

Blue Reminder is the sixth studio album by the American musician Hand Habits. It was released on August 22, 2025, via Fat Possum in LP, CD and digital formats.

== Background ==
Preceded by Hand Habits' fifth record in 2022, Fun House + Blueprints, and co-produced with Joseph Lorge, the album features collaborators including Blake Mills and Tim Carr. It was recorded in Los Angeles. "Wheel of Change" was released as the first single on June 4, 2025, alongside a music video directed by Otium.

== Reception ==
Professional ratings
Review scores
Source	Rating
AllMusic	4/5 stars
The Line of Best Fit	8/10 stars
Paste	8.0/10
Pitchfork	7.9/10

AllMusic assigned the album a rating of four stars and remarked, "what's more impressive is that Blue Reminder remains distinctly vulnerable and intimate, with songs about things like insecurity, regret, and calm devotion."

Paste's Cassidy Sollazzo rated it 8.0 out of ten, describing it as "cohesive in a way that feels so unintentionally natural, the live recording process coating every song in warmth and comfort."

The album received a 8/10 rating from the Line of Best Fit, which referred to it as "an album that vibrates with courage, tenderness, and a sheer insistence to feel," and "not just another indie-folk sojourn; it’s a declaration of presence."

Marissa Lorusso of Pitchfork assigned the album a rating of 7.9, noting that "Duffy offers something of a mission statement for continuing to probe these paradoxes: 'Songs bloom,' they sing, 'from the wreckage.'," in addition to suggesting it is "rife with these dualities: how contentment can commingle with anxiety; how the past bears on the present; how new love can show up just when the world seems hopeless."

== Track listing ==
All tracks are written by Meg Duffy; "Bluebird of Happiness" written with Leora Spring and Marina Allen.

Blue Reminder track listing
No.	Title	Length
1.	"More Today"	5:07
2.	"Wheel of Change"	4:25
3.	"Nubble"	4:08
4.	"Dead Rat"	2:44
5.	"Jasmine Blossoms"	3:41
6.	"Way It Goes"	4:15
7.	"(Forgiveness)"	2:19
8.	"Beauty 62"	4:25
9.	"Bluebird of Happiness"	3:18
10.	"Blue Reminder"	3:45
11.	"Quiet Summer"	5:29
12.	"Living Proof"	2:41
Total length:		46:17

== Personnel ==
Credits adapted from Bandcamp and Tidal.

- Meg Duffy – lead vocals, production, additional engineering (all tracks); electric guitar (track 7)
- Joseph Lorge – production, engineering (all tracks); electric guitar (3, 6)
- Ella Feingold – additional engineering
- Griffin Goldsmith – engineering (all tracks), drums (2)
- Huntley Miller – mastering
- Tim Carr – drums (1–9, 11)
- Alan Wyffels – piano (1–4, 6, 7, 11), flute (10)
- Remy Morritt – drums (1)
- Patrick Kelly – bass guitar (2, 9, 11)
- Gregory Uhlmann – electric guitar (2, 3, 5, 7–9, 11), acoustic guitar (4), drums (6)
- Jenn Wasner – background vocals (2)
- Daniel Aged – bass guitar (3–5, 8, 12)
- Benny Bock – piano (3, 9), synthesizer (10, 12)
- Rose Droll – synthesizer (3, 8), piano (12)
- Miya Folick – background vocals (5)
- Josh Johnson – saxophone (5–7)
- Ella Feingold – electric guitar (8)
- Blake Mills – electric guitar, additional production (9)
- Marina Allen – background vocals (9)
- Anna Butters – bassoon (10)
- Olivia Kaplan – background vocals (11)
