= Christine (Christine and the Queens song) =

Single by Christine and the Queens

from the album Chaleur humaine
- Released: 13 October 2014 ("Christine"); 3 March 2015 ("Tilted")
- Genre: Synth-pop; electropop
- Length: 3:54
- Label: Because; Neon Gold
- Songwriter: Héloïse Letissier
- Producer: Letissier

Christine and the Queens singles chronology
"Saint Claude" (2014)	"Christine" (2014)	"Paradis perdus" (2015)

"Tilted" singles chronology
"Jonathan" (2015)	"Tilted" (2015)	"Saint Claude" (2016)

Alternative cover
- "Tilted" cover art

Music videos
- "Christine" on YouTube
- "Tilted" on YouTube

"Christine", also released under the title "Tilted", is a song by French singer Christine and the Queens. "Christine", which is recorded in French, was released for download on 13 October 2014 through Because Music as the third single from his debut studio album Chaleur humaine (2014). It was, however, originally recorded in English titled "Cripple" in 2012, and a later English version was released as "Tilted" on 3 March 2015. It was named one of the ten best songs of 2015 by Time magazine. "Christine" was a number-one hit in both regions of Belgium (Flanders and Wallonia) and peaked at number three in France, while "Tilted" became a top-20 hit in Ireland and the United Kingdom.

== Background ==
According to Héloïse Letissier, when he first wrote the song, it was written in English. It was originally recorded under the title "Cripple" for an EP, Mac Abbey, in 2012. However, when he performed the song in Brighton in May 2013, the chorus "I actually do enjoy being a cripple" was poorly received by the audience. Letissier said: "... there was a huge embarrassed silence. I thought it was really ambiguous! But it's not." He reworked the lyrics in French as "Christine" for his 2014 debut album, and from this he made another English version, "Tilted". The English and French versions are not an exact translation and have significant differences in their lyrics, for example the English version begins with "I will die before Methuselah / So I'll fight sleep with ammonia," while the French version may be translated as "I start books at the end / And I hold my head high for nothing " (Je commence les livres par la fin / Et j'ai le menton haut pour un rien).

Letissier said that the song is "an easy song with an uneasy subject. It's about feeling out of place, not finding your balance, or being depressed even, but with playful images, with a song you can dance on." He explained that the song is about "embracing the fact that you can't really find your balance", which in his case is embracing his own awkwardness and the feeling of being imperfect. It would therefore be about "embracing who you are", and "being proud of who you are and where you stand". He also explained the English title of the song: "The French song is talking about the same difficulty of turning on your feet. I was searching for lots of images or words that could fit, and I just stumbled upon this word, to tilt or be tilted, and I was exactly trying to find this image. It's literally talking about not finding your balance with a playful image."

== Music video ==
A music video to accompany the release of "Christine" was first released onto YouTube on 18 December 2014 at a total length of three minutes and fifty-six seconds. The minimal and largely blue and black visuals in the videos for "Christine" and the English version "Tilted" are identical, and feature Letissier and his dancers performing intricate dance routines on a platform.

In the last scene of Better Things' second-season finale, the music video of "Christine" was re-enacted by Sam, Frankie, Duke and Phyllis as a graduation gift for Max. Pitchfork named the sequence as one of "The 10 Best Music Moments on TV in 2017".

== Track listings ==
=== "Christine" ===
Digital download
No.	Title	Length
1.	"Christine"	3:54

=== "Tilted" ===
Digital download
No.	Title	Length
1.	"Tilted"	3:54

Remixes digital download
No.	Title	Length
1.	"Tilted" (MS MR Remix)	3:46
2.	"Tilted" (Clock Opera Remix)	3:39
3.	"Tilted" (Bayonne Remix)	4:05
4.	"Tilted" (Paradis Remix)	5:50
5.	"Tilted" (Danny L Harle Remix)	2:31

== Charts ==
=== "Christine" ===
==== Weekly charts ====
Chart (2015)	Peak position
Belgium (Ultratop 50 Flanders)	1
Belgium (Ultratop 50 Wallonia)	1
France (SNEP)	3
Netherlands (Single Top 100)	41
Switzerland (Schweizer Hitparade)	32

==== Year-end charts ====
Chart (2015)	Position
Belgium (Ultratop 50 Flanders)	3
Belgium (Ultratop 50 Wallonia)	1
France (SNEP)	12

Chart (2016)	Position
France (SNEP)	160

=== "Tilted" ===
Chart (2016)	Peak position
Australia (ARIA)	54
Iceland (RÚV)	3
Ireland (IRMA)	13
New Zealand Heatseekers (Recorded Music NZ)	1
Scottish Singles Sales (Official Charts)	18
UK Singles (Official Charts)	20
UK Indie (Official Charts)	2

== Certifications ==
=== "Christine" ===
Region	Certification	Certified units/sales
Belgium (BRMA)	2× Platinum	40,000^{‡}
Netherlands (NVPI)	Gold	15,000^{‡}
Switzerland (IFPI Switzerland)	Gold	15,000^{‡}
^{‡} Sales+streaming figures based on certification alone.

=== "Tilted" ===
Region	Certification	Certified units/sales
United Kingdom (BPI)	Platinum	600,000^{‡}
^{‡} Sales+streaming figures based on certification alone.

== Release history ==
Region	Date	Format	Label	Ref.
France	13 October 2014	CD; digital download	Because Music	
United States	3 March 2015	Digital download	Because Music	
United Kingdom	15 January 2016	Digital download	Because Music	
