= Life, and Another =

Studio album by Mega Bog
- Released: July 23, 2021
- Studio: The Unknown (Anacortes); Way Out (Woodinville); Tropico Beauty (Los Angeles)
- Genre: Folk-pop
- Length: 44:10
- Label: Paradise of Bachelors
- Producer: Erin Birgy; James Krivchenia

Mega Bog chronology
Dolphine (2019)	Life, and Another (2021)	End of Everything (2023)

Life, and Another is the sixth record by the avant-pop musician Erin Birgy, under the moniker of Mega Bog. It was released by Paradise of Bachelors in July 2021. The record is produced by Birgy and James Krivchenia, the drummer for folk rock quartet Big Thief.

== Background ==
Life, and Another was recorded at the Unknown studio in Anacortes, Washington, from 2019. The album is influenced in part by the artist David Wojnarowicz's audio journals, transcriptions of which were published as Weight of the Earth (2018).

== Critical reception ==
Professional ratings
Aggregate scores
Source	Rating
Metacritic	81/100
Review scores
Source	Rating
AllMusic	4/5 stars
Beats Per Minute	76%
God Is in the TV	8/10
The Guardian	3/5 stars
The Line of Best Fit	8/10
Pitchfork	8.0/10

Life, and Another has been welcomed with mostly positive reviews. On Metacritic, it has a score of 81 out of 100, indicating "universal acclaim", based on six reviews. Sophie Kemp for Pitchfork gave it a glowing review, calling it "delightfully freaky".

== Track listing ==
All tracks are written by Erin Birgy.

Life, and Another track listing
No.	Title	Length
1.	"Flower"	2:35
2.	"Station to Station"	4:25
3.	"Weight of the Earth, on Paper"	3:12
4.	"Crumb Back"	3:14
5.	"Butterfly"	2:50
6.	"Life, and Another"	4:10
7.	"Maybe You Died"	4:27
8.	"Beagle in the Cloud"	1:42
9.	"Darmok"	3:19
10.	"Adorable"	1:13
11.	"Bull of Heaven"	1:59
12.	"Obsidian Lizard"	2:07
13.	"Before a Black Tea"	3:29
14.	"Ameleon"	5:20
Total length:		44:10

== Personnel ==
Musicians

- Erin Birgy – lead vocals (tracks 1–8, 10, 12–14), nylon guitar (track 1), background vocals (2–4, 6, 7, 10, 12–14), electric guitar (3–7, 9–11, 13, 14), sound effects (4, 13), 12-string guitar (10)
- Zach Burba – bass guitar (tracks 1, 2, 4, 7, 10, 12, 14), background vocals (1, 3, 4), sampling (2), drum set (3, 5, 6, 10, 13), unplugged electric guitar (3), electric guitar (4), drum pad sampler (5); timpani, jam block (11)
- Aaron Otheim – synthesizers (tracks 1–3, 5–7, 9, 11–14), grand piano (1, 3–6, 9–11, 13), electric piano (8, 12), background vocals (12), organ (13)
- James Krivchenia – shaker (tracks 1, 3, 5, 6, 13), triangle (1, 3, 5, 13), snaps (1), drum set (2, 14), congas (3, 4, 6, 13); chimes, cowbell, background vocals (3); tambourine (4, 14), claps (4), orchestral percussion (10), bells (14)
- Will Segerstrom – electric guitar (tracks 1, 3–6, 10, 11, 13, 14), background vocals (3)
- Andrew Dorsett – drum set (tracks 1, 4, 7, 11), additional vocals (4), synthesizer (9, 12, 14); electric piano, background vocals (12); upright piano (14)
- Meg Duffy – electric guitar (tracks 1, 6, 13, 14), guitar (10)
- Matt Bachmann – synthesizer (tracks 2, 9), bass guitar (3, 6, 11), background vocals (3)
- Alex Liebman – saxophone (tracks 4–7)
- Jade Tcimpidis – bass guitar (track 5)

Technical

- Erin Birgy – production
- James Krivchenia – production, mixing, engineering
- Heba Kadry – mastering
- Geoff Traeger – additional engineering
- Phil Hartunian – additional engineering

Visuals

- Erin Birgy – photography
- Joel Gregory – design
- Zach Burba – artist photo
