= On the Floor (disambiguation) =

"On the Floor" is a 2011 song by Jennifer Lopez.

On the Floor may also refer to:

- On the Floor, a banking novel by Irish writer Aifric Campbell
- On the Floor, a 2004 album by Adassa and its title track
- "On the Floor", a 1984 song by Glenn Jones from Finesse
- "On the Floor", a 2013 song by IceJJFish
- "On the Floor", a 2010 song by Brandon Flowers from Flamingo
- "On the Floor", a 2020 song by Perfume Genius
- On the Floor with Fatback, a 1992 album by the Fatback Band
