= Chaleur humaine =

Studio album by Christine and the Queens
- Released: 2 June 2014
- Studio: RAK Studios; 123 Studios; Smokehouse Studios
- Genre: Synth-pop; freakpop; alternative R&B; chillwave; indie pop
- Length: 47:03
- Language: English; French
- Label: Because; Neon Gold
- Producer: Christine and the Queens

Christine and the Queens chronology
Chaleur humaine (2014)	Chris (2018)

Singles from Chaleur humaine
- 1. "Nuit 17 à 52" Released: 3 June 2013; 2. "Saint Claude" Released: 14 April 2014; 3. "Christine" Released: 13 October 2014; 4. "Paradis perdus" Released: June 2015

Singles from Christine and the Queens
- 1. "No Harm Is Done" Released: 11 September 2015; 2. "Jonathan" Released: 16 October 2015; 3. "Tilted" Released: 15 January 2016

Chaleur humaine ('Human Warmth'), retitled Christine and the Queens in some English-speaking territories, is the debut studio album by the French pop singer Christine and the Queens. The album was re-released in 2015 with new songs and "Tilted" – the English version of "Christine" – served as a single.

== Background ==
The album was first released in France as Chaleur humaine in June 2014. The album was released in United States on 16 October 2015 via Because Music as Christine and the Queens. For its American release, many the tracks were reworked with English lyrics and revamped beats by producer Ash Workman. Two tracks were replaced with three new songs. Two of the new songs are collaborations – "Jonathan" with Perfume Genius, and "No Harm Is Done" with rapper Tunji Ige. The American version was released in the UK in 2016 but reverted to its original French title.

== Composition ==
On his verified Genius account, Letissier offers some insight on how some tracks were conceived. He describes the whole album as "a dream about adolescence" "Christine"/"Tilted" is about "trying to embrace this weirdness, awkwardness of yours, all those thoughts and details that make you feel like you don't belong." "Saint Claude" is written in a stream of consciousness style, inspired by rappers like Kendrick Lamar that Letissier was listening to at the time. "Science Fiction" is about a Seapunk girl named Stella "galaxy shorts" and the song is described as an LSD daydream about her. The lyric "paper cut humanoids" is a direct allusion to the animated series The Wild Planet. Letissier describes it as an italo disco inspired by Lovemachine by Supermax. The percussion on "Here" was inspired by Phil Collins' "In the Air Tonight". "Ugly-Pretty" takes inspiration "from certain harmonic sequences specific to operas and pieces of classical music" as well as Klaus Nomi and House music and the title itself was taken from Letissier watching American reality television programs like America's Next Top Model. The bridge features lyrics in French that refer to pornography and the idea of abstract sex not connected to emotions, and the theme of ugliness vs attractiveness at the same time.

== Critical reception ==
Professional ratings
Aggregate scores
Source	Rating
AnyDecentMusic?	8.1/10
Metacritic	85/100
Review scores
Source	Rating
AllMusic	4/5 stars
Billboard	4/5 stars
The Guardian	5/5 stars
The Irish Times	4/5 stars
Mojo	4/5 stars
The Observer	4/5 stars
Pitchfork	8.0/10
Q	4/5 stars
Spin	8/10
Uncut	7/10

The album has been given a Metacritic rating of 85 based on 11 reviews, indicating "universal acclaim". The album is featured on many end of year lists, including Rough Trade and NME.

=== Accolades ===
Publication	Accolade	Year	Rank	Ref.
The Guardian	Best Albums of 2016	2016	8	
The Independent	Best Albums of 2016	2016	20	
Mojo	The 50 Best Albums of 2016	2016	46	
NME	NME's Albums of the Year 2016	2016	3	
Rough Trade	Albums of the Year	2016	16	

== Commercial performance ==
The album first entered the French chart at No. 6 on its release in June 2014, and peaked at No. 2 in February 2015. As of April 2018, the album had sold 650,000 units in this country. It also reached No. 1 on the Belgian Wallonia albums chart.

The English version of the album was released in the UK on 26 February 2016, and first entered the UK Albums Chart at No. 132 the following week. It then re-entered at No. 8 in June 2016, just prior to Christine and the Queens performing a well-received concert at the Glastonbury Festival. It peaked at No. 2 on 29 July 2016. As of April 2018, the album had sold 220,000 units in the UK. The album debuted at No. 3 on the Irish Albums Chart in June 2016, before reaching No. 1 on 21 July 2016.

In 2016 it was awarded a platinum certification from the Independent Music Companies Association, which indicated sales of at least 400,000 copies+ throughout Europe.

As of January 2017 the record has sold 970,000 copies worldwide, in addition to attracting more than 194m streams – an ‘album equivalent’ streaming figure in most territories of 129,000.

== Track listing ==
Chaleur humaine — French edition
No.	Title	Writer(s)	Length
1.	"iT"	Héloïse Letissier	3:38
2.	"Saint Claude"	Letissier	3:59
3.	"Christine"	Letissier	3:54
4.	"Science fiction"	Letissier	3:39
5.	"Paradis perdus"	Christophe; Jean Michel Jarre	3:35
6.	"Half Ladies"	Letissier	4:18
7.	"Chaleur humaine"	Letissier	3:57
8.	"Narcissus Is Back"	Letissier	3:28
9.	"Ugly-Pretty"	Letissier	3:25
10.	"Nuit 17 à 52"	Letissier	4:22
11.	"Here"	Letissier	4:27

Christine and the Queens — 2015 reissue
No.	Title	Writer(s)	Length
1.	"iT"	Héloïse Letissier	3:38
2.	"Saint Claude"	Letissier	4:01
3.	"Tilted"	Letissier	3:53
4.	"No Harm Is Done" (featuring Tunji Ige)	Noah Breakfast; Tunji Ige; Letissier	3:30
5.	"Science fiction"	Letissier	3:38
6.	"Paradis perdus"	Christophe; Jean Michel Jarre	3:35
7.	"Half Ladies"	Letissier	4:18
8.	"Jonathan" (featuring Perfume Genius)	Letissier	3:24
9.	"Narcissus Is Back"	Letissier	3:28
10.	"Safe and Holy"	Letissier	4:07
11.	"Night 52"	Letissier	4:21
12.	"Here"	Letissier	4:27

Chaleur humaine — Digital Edition Collector
No.	Title	Writer(s)	Length
1.	"iT"	Letissier	3:38
2.	"Saint Claude"	Letissier	4:01
3.	"Christine"	Letissier	3:53
4.	"Science fiction"	Letissier	3:38
5.	"Paradis perdus"	Christophe; Jarre	3:35
6.	"Half Ladies"	Letissier	4:18
7.	"Chaleur humaine"		3:57
8.	"Narcissus Is Back"	Letissier	3:28
9.	"Ugly-Pretty"		3:25
10.	"Nuit 17 à 52"	Letissier	4:22
11.	"Here"	Letissier	4:27
12.	"No Harm Is Done" (featuring Tunji Ige)	Breakfast; Ige; Letissier	3:30
13.	"Intranquillité"		3:13
14.	"Amazoniaque"		3:40
15.	"Safe and Holy"	Letissier	4:07
16.	"Jonathan" (featuring Perfume Genius)	Letissier	3:24

Chaleur humaine — iTunes deluxe edition
No.	Title	Writer(s)	Length
1.	"iT"	Letissier	3:38
2.	"Saint Claude"	Letissier	4:01
3.	"Tilted"	Letissier	3:53
4.	"No Harm Is Done" (featuring Tunji Ige)	Breakfast; Ige; Letissier	3:30
5.	"Science fiction"	Letissier	3:38
6.	"Paradis perdus"	Christophe; Jarre	3:35
7.	"Half Ladies"	Letissier	4:18
8.	"Jonathan" (featuring Perfume Genius)	Letissier	3:24
9.	"Narcissus Is Back"	Letissier	3:28
10.	"Safe and Holy"	Letissier	4:07
11.	"Night 52"	Letissier	4:21
12.	"Here"	Letissier	4:27
13.	"Saint Claude (Version française)"		3:59
14.	"Christine"	Letissier	3:54
15.	"Chaleur humaine"	Letissier	3:57
16.	"Ugly-Pretty"		3:25
17.	"Intranquillité"		3:13
18.	"Amazoniaque"		3:40

Chaleur humaine — Physical deluxe edition — Disc 1: CD
No.	Title	Writer(s)	Length
1.	"iT"	Letissier	3:38
2.	"Saint Claude"	Letissier	4:01
3.	"Tilted"	Letissier	3:53
4.	"No Harm Is Done" (featuring Tunji Ige)	Breakfast; Ige; Letissier	3:30
5.	"Science fiction"	Letissier	3:38
6.	"Paradis perdus"	Christophe; Jarre	3:35
7.	"Half Ladies"	Letissier	4:18
8.	"Jonathan" (featuring Perfume Genius)	Letissier	3:24
9.	"Narcissus Is Back"	Letissier	3:28
10.	"Safe and Holy"	Letissier	4:07
11.	"Night 52"	Letissier	4:21
12.	"Here"	Letissier	4:27
13.	"Saint Claude (Version française)"		3:59
14.	"Christine"	Letissier	3:54
15.	"Chaleur humaine"	Letissier	3:57
16.	"Ugly-Pretty"		3:25
17.	"Intranquillité"		3:13
18.	"Amazoniaque"		3:40

Chaleur Humaine — Physical deluxe edition — Disc 2: DVD
No.	Title	Length
1.	"Starshipper" (Live Performance from Zenith Lille, France)
2.	"Half Ladies" (Live Performance from Zenith Lille, France)
3.	"iT" (Live Performance from Zenith Lille, France)
4.	"Science fiction" (Live Performance from Zenith Lille, France)
5.	"Safe and Holy" (Live Performance from Zenith Lille, France)
6.	"Here" (Live Performance from Zenith Lille, France)
7.	"No Harm Is Done" (Live Performance from Zenith Lille, France)
8.	"Christine" (Live Performance from Zenith Lille, France)
9.	"Who Is It" (Live Performance from Zenith Lille, France)
10.	"Jonathan" (Live Performance from Zenith Lille, France)
11.	"Narcissus Is Back" (Live Performance from Zenith Lille, France)
12.	"Ugly-Pretty" (Live Performance from Zenith Lille, France)
13.	"Intranquillité" (Live Performance from Zenith Lille, France)
14.	"Chaleur humaine" (Live Performance from Zenith Lille, France)
15.	"Saint Claude" (Live Performance from Zenith Lille, France)
16.	"Paradis perdus" (Live Performance from Zenith Lille, France)
17.	"The Loving Cup" (Live Performance from Zenith Lille, France)
18.	"Nuit 17 à 52" (Live Performance from Zenith Lille, France)

Christine and the Queens — Bonus tracks
No.	Title	Writer(s)	Length
1.	"Saint Claude (Version française)"		3:59
2.	"Christine"	Letissier	3:54
3.	"Chaleur humaine"	Letissier	3:57
4.	"Ugly-Pretty"		3:25
5.	"Intranquillité"		3:13
6.	"Amazoniaque"		3:40

Chaleur Humaine — Les Inédits
No.	Title	Writer(s)	Length
1.	"No Harm Is Done" (featuring Tunji Ige)	Noah Breakfast; Tunji Ige; Letissier	3:30
2.	"Intranquillité"		3:13
3.	"Amazoniaque"		3:40
4.	"Safe and Holy"	Letissier	4:07
5.	"Jonathan" (featuring Perfume Genius)	Letissier	3:24

== Charts ==
=== Weekly charts ===
Chart (2014–16)	Peak position
Australian Albums (ARIA)	8
Belgian Albums (Ultratop Flanders)	5
Belgian Albums (Ultratop Wallonia)	1
Dutch Albums (Album Top 100)	25
French Albums (SNEP)	2
Irish Albums (IRMA)	1
New Zealand Albums (RMNZ)	8
Scottish Albums (OCC)	2
Swiss Albums (Schweizer Hitparade)	7
UK Albums (OCC)	2
US Heatseekers Albums (Billboard)	7
US Top Rock Albums (Billboard)	48

=== Year-end charts ===
Chart (2014)	Position
Belgian Albums (Ultratop Wallonia)	46
French Albums (SNEP)	23

Chart (2015)	Position
Belgian Albums (Ultratop Flanders)	7
Belgian Albums (Ultratop Wallonia)	5
French Albums (SNEP)	5
Swiss Albums (Schweizer Hitparade)	18

Chart (2016)	Position
Belgian Albums (Ultratop Flanders)	95
Belgian Albums (Ultratop Wallonia)	58
UK Albums (OCC)	33

== Certifications ==
Region	Certification	Certified units/sales
Belgium (BRMA)	Platinum	30,000^{*}
France (SNEP)	Diamond	850,000
Switzerland (IFPI Switzerland)	Platinum	20,000^{‡}
United Kingdom (BPI)	Gold	231,898
^{*} Sales figures based on certification alone.^{‡} Sales+streaming figures based on certification alone.
