= Saint Claude (song) =

Single by Christine and the Queens

from the album Chaleur Humaine
- Released: 14 April 2014
- Recorded: 2014
- Genre: Synth-pop
- Length: 3:59
- Label: Because; Neon Gold; Atlantic
- Songwriter: Héloïse Letissier
- Producers: Christine and the Queens

Christine and the Queens singles chronology
"Nuit 17 à 52" (2013)	"Saint Claude" (2014)	"Christine" (2014)

Music video
- "Saint Claude" on YouTube

"Saint Claude" is a song by French singer Christine and the Queens. It was released as a digital download on 14 April 2014 through Because Music, Neon Gold Records, and Atlantic Records as the second single from his debut studio album Chaleur Humaine (2014). The song was written by Héloïse Letissier and his debut US release.

The song was released alongside an extended play of the same name, featuring four songs from Chaleur humaine and "The Loving Cup", a song from the previous single/EP "Nuit 17 à 52".

== Critical reception ==
Brennan Carley of Spin called the EP "a masterclass in orchestral layering and attention-grabbing lyricism."

== Music video ==
A music video to accompany the release of "Saint Claude" was first released onto YouTube on 29 April 2014 at a total length of three minutes and forty-two seconds. It won Music video of the year at the Victoires de la Musique.

== Track listing ==
Digital download
No.	Title	Length
1.	"Saint Claude"	3:59

Saint Claude (EP)
No.	Title	Length
1.	"iT"	3:38
2.	"Saint Claude (Version Française)"	3:38
3.	"Tilted"	3:53
4.	"Narcissus Is Back"	3:28
5.	"The Loving Cup"	3:42

== Charts ==
=== Weekly charts ===
Chart (2014–2015)	Peak position
Belgium (Ultratip Bubbling Under Flanders)	6
Belgium (Ultratop 50 Wallonia)	8
France (SNEP)	4
Switzerland (Schweizer Hitparade)	60

=== Year-end charts ===
Chart (2014)	Position
France (SNEP)	59
Chart (2015)	Position
Belgium (Ultratop Wallonia)	44
France (SNEP)	34

== Release history ==
Region	Date	Format	Label
Various	14 April 2014	Digital download	Because Music
