= Erin Birgy =

American singer

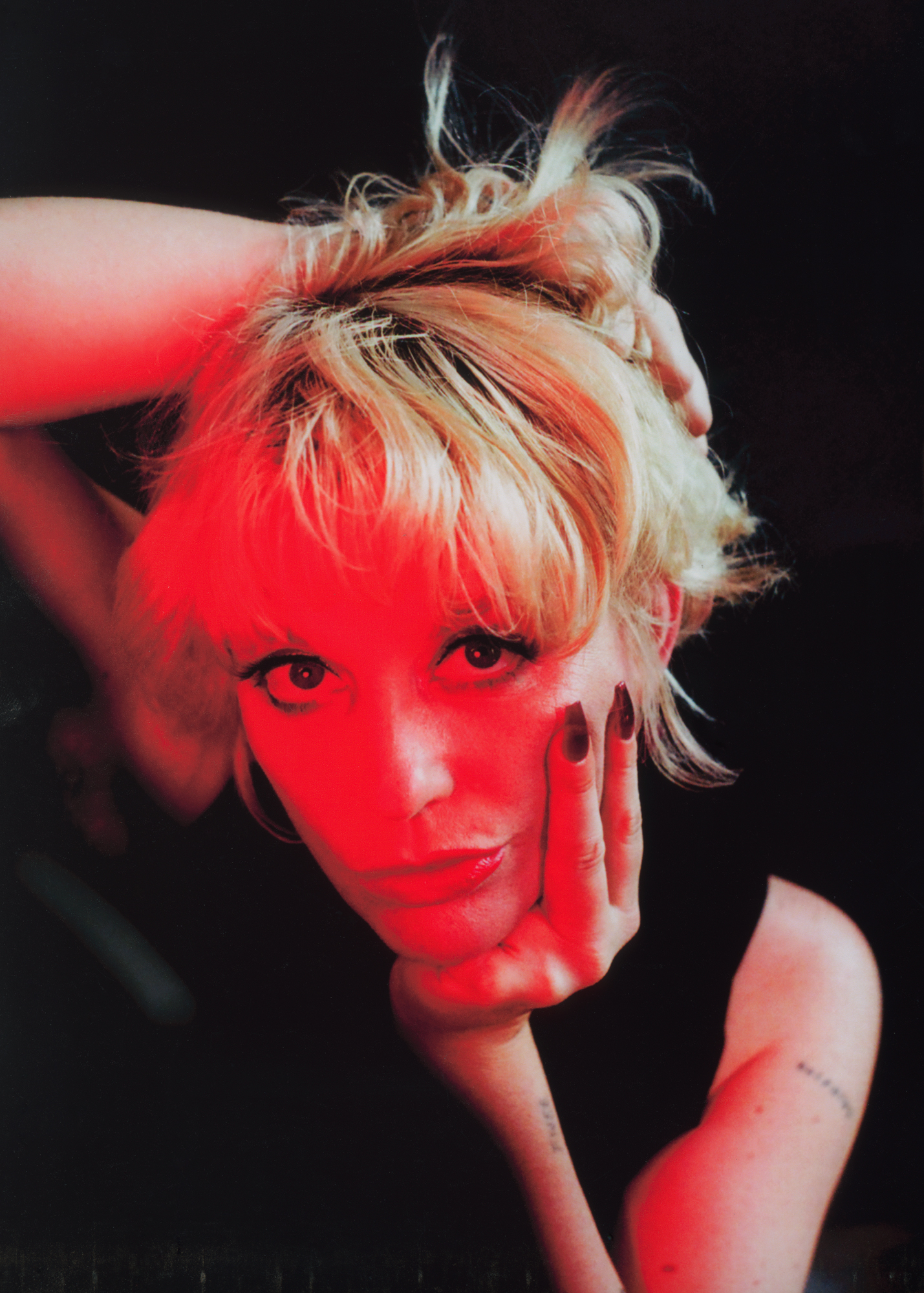

Background information
- Also known as: Mega Bog
- Born: 1988 or 1989 (age 37–38); Idaho, U.S.
- Genres: Avant-pop experimental pop; folk; jazz; experimental pop
- Occupations: Singer; songwriter; musician; record producer
- Instruments: Vocals; guitar
- Years active: 2009–present
- Labels: Mexican Summer; Paradise of Bachelors; Couple Skate; Gnome Life; Wizards of the Ghost
- Spouse: Rob Savage (m. 2023)
- Website: megabog.com

Erin Birgy (born 1988 or 1989), better known as Mega Bog, is an American experimental pop singer, songwriter, and musician. They have released seven studio albums.

== Early life ==
Erin Birgy was born in Idaho in 1988 or 1989. They kept horses as a child and were part of a traveling rodeo, in which they practiced barrel racing, calf roping and mutton busting. In their teens they moved to Spokane, Washington, then Olympia, Washington.

== Career ==
Birgy took on the name Mega Bog in around 2009, having previously performed under the names Little Swamp and Midi Marsh. In 2019 Birgy and James Krivchenia of Big Thief moved to Los Angeles, then to an off-grid cabin in New Mexico.

Birgy's regular collaborators include Krivchenia and Meg Duffy. Their work has been compared to that of Animal Collective, Big Thief, the Blue Nile, David Bowie, Tim Buckley, Aldous Harding, Julia Holter, Cate Le Bon, Laura Marling, Joni Mitchell, Nico, Jessica Pratt, the Sea and Cake, Steely Dan, Stereolab, Vanishing Twin, Caetano Veloso, and Weyes Blood.

=== Okay Human (2011) ===
Okay Human was released in 2011.

=== Gone Banana (2014) ===
Gone Banana was released in 2014. Ben Salmon of Paste wrote that the album "simmers quietly, an avant-pop album that sounds like it was recorded around the corner and down the hall so as not to wake the neighbors." Adria Young of The Coast described the album as "a collection of vocal and aural whispers set against sassy jazz saxophone and dissonant sounds." Reviewing the album for AllMusic, Fred Thomas described it as a "fully formed distillation of the project's various muses" and praised its creation of "a strange, almost unnameable type of mood, one that lingers softly for a while after the album comes to a close." Nina Corcoran of Consequence of Sound suggested that Gone Banana's stylistic risk-taking "throws it off from hitting a clean stride", but described Birgy as "someone who’s truly walking their own path with experimental pop" and described the album as "ahead of its time".

=== Happy Together (2017) ===
Happy Together was released in 2017. The album was mixed and mastered by James Krivchenia of Big Thief, and also features Meg Duffy. The album's lyrics deal with an experience of sexual assault and the music industry's treatment of women and survivors of rape.

Pitchfork's Quinn Moreland praised the malleability of the album and of Birgy's vocals in particular, which she described as "fluctuat[ing] from an operatic soprano to a wispy sage to a windswept Gold Dust Woman." Moreland singled out "192014" and "Fwee" for praise, characterizing the former as "haunting" and "interstellar" and the latter as a meditation "on inner peace following a period of trauma." Ben Salmon of Paste argued that "Happy Together radiated a new confidence, pairing Birgy’s unconventional song structures with gauzy production and strange jazz jaunts." Writing for Tiny Mix Tapes, Leah B. Levinson described the album as "a balancing act between the theatrical and the cool: careening, turning the confessional on its side, and muddling the surrounding water with affects of the surreal." Levinson identified "Worst Way" as the album's "coolest and most vulnerable" point, arguing that it deals with "the transformation of pain and its reflection into assuredness and experience."

Gorilla vs. Bear placed Happy Together tenth on its list of the best albums of 2017, describing it as "a dreamy, jazzy opus ... that addresses some dark and relevant themes in an elegant and surreal way.... The most under-appreciated album of the year."

=== Dolphine (2019) ===
Dolphine was released in 2019 via the North Carolina–based label Paradise of Bachelors. The album is inspired by the work of the science fiction author Ursula K. Le Guin. The album was engineered by Krivchenia, who also contributed percussion and effects; Duffy also features on guitar.

Quinn Moreland of Pitchfork wrote that "Birgy is not a storyteller in the traditional, linear sense. Rather, she strings crisp and enigmatic fragments into enchanting collages." Moreland continued: "Birgy’s unapologetic commitment to her inner code. This is her reality, and sometimes it can be stranger—and certainly more poetic—than fiction" and concluded that "Even at its most inexplicable, there’s not a moment on Dolphine that feels careless." Diva Harris of The Quietus described Dolphine as a collection "of shimmering dirges which could just as easily soundtrack ancient woodland or the night sky as the deepest imaginable depths of the sea" and noted that the album's "whimsy" is accompanied by "grit and tough shit": "For all of Dolphine's cuteness – every crying spider, wind chime, and faerie – there’s an equal and opposite: a trollish man touching a woman without consent, a steaming dirty nappy, another murder." Writing in Paste, Ben Salmon compared Dolphine positively to Birgy's two previous studio albums, arguing that the sound quality, performance and songs all constitute an improvement, and praised the title track and "Fwee Again", which he described as "unbridled exploration that goes through about three iterations—spacey intro, jittery indie rock, spooky piano tune". Fred Thomas, reviewing the album for AllMusic, described it as Birgy's "strongest statement in a history of exceptional work" and praised "For the Old World", "Left Door" and "Dolphine". Randall Roberts of the Los Angeles Times wrote that on the album "Birgy harnesses her voice, a breathy, elastic instrument that she flexes in myriad ways, in service of songs in which no two measures are alike" and "phrases her lines with the ear of an actor, conveying emotional info and drama with each oblong couplet."

=== Life, and Another (2021) ===
Life, and Another was released on July 23, 2021, again on Paradise of Bachelors. The album features collaborations with Krivchenia, Duffy and Andrew Dorset of Lake. Philip Sherburne of Pitchfork described the album as "a firehose of cryptic metaphors, veiled allusions, and seemingly disconnected thoughts sprayed against a bright, skeletal frame of jagged jazz-prog." Pitchfork named the album one of the 31 best rock albums of 2021.

=== End of Everything (2023) ===
End of Everything was released in May 2023. The album features collaborations with Duffy, Krivchenia, and Jackson Macintosh of Tops. The Pitchfork review called the album "far more challenging than the lush, sprightly Life, and Another; although a good deal shorter, it’s more dense, and it can feel overwhelming." Paste rated it 8.4.

== Other work ==
Birgy appeared in an episode of the period drama television series Vinyl, playing the Velvet Underground's drummer Moe Tucker.

== Personal life ==
Birgy married English filmmaker Rob Savage in November 2023.
