= No Harm Is Done =

Single by Christine and the Queens featuring Tunji Ige

from the album Christine and the Queens
- Released: 8 September 2015
- Recorded: 2015
- Studio: Saint Germain, Paris; 123, London
- Genre: R&B
- Length: 3:30
- Label: Because; Neon Gold; Atlantic
- Songwriter(s): Héloïse Letissier; Tunji Ige; Noah Breakfast
- Producer(s): Héloïse Letissier; Tunji Ige; Noah Breakfast

Christine and the Queens singles chronology
"Paradis perdus" (2015)	"No Harm Is Done" (2015)	"Jonathan" (2015)

"No Harm Is Done" is a song by French singer and songwriter Christine and the Queens featuring vocals from Tunji Ige. It was released as a digital download on 8 September 2015 as the lead single from the English edition of his debut studio album, Christine and the Queens (2015).

== Music video ==
A music video to accompany the release of "No Harm Is Done" was released onto YouTube on September 23, 2015, at a total length of three minutes and fifty-two seconds.

== Track listing ==
Digital download
No.	Title	Length
1.	"No Harm Is Done" (featuring Tunji Ige)	3:30

== Charts ==
Chart (2015)	Peak position
France (SNEP)	118
US Billboard Twitter Emerging Artists (Billboard)	10

== Release history ==
Region	Date	Format	Label
Worldwide	8 September 2015	Digital download	Because Music
