= Nuit 17 à 52 =

Single by Christine and the Queens

from the album Chaleur humaine
- Released: 3 June 2013
- Recorded: 2013
- Genre: Synth-pop
- Length: 4:22
- Label: Because
- Songwriter: Héloïse Letissier
- Producers: Christine and the Queens; Manila Kiddo

Christine and the Queens singles chronology
"Nuit 17 à 52" (2013)	"Saint Claude" (2014)

"Nuit 17 à 52" is a song by French singer Christine and the Queens. It was released as a digital download on 3 June 2013 through Because Music as his debut single from his debut studio album Chaleur humaine (2014). On the US and UK editions of the album, it was replaced by an English version entitled "Night 52". The song was written by Héloïse Letissier, i.e. Christine and the Queens himself.

The song was also released alongside an extended play of the same name, which charted at number 130 on the French Albums chart.

== Music video ==
A music video to accompany the release of "Nuit 17 à 52" was first released onto YouTube on 12 June 2013 at a total length of three minutes and fifty-five seconds. In this black-and-white video, Christine and the Queens plays several characters.

== Track listing ==
=== Single ===
Digital download
No.	Title	Length
1.	"Nuit 17 à 52"	4:22

=== Extended plays ===
Nuit 17 à 52 - EP
No.	Title	Length
1.	"The Loving Cup"	3:40
2.	"Nuit 17 à 52"	4:22
3.	"Starshipper"	5:02
4.	"Wandering Lovers"	3:18
5.	"Photos Souvenirs (William Sheller cover)"	3:17
Total length:		19:40

Nuit 17 à 52 - EP (Deezer Session)
No.	Title	Length
6.	"Starshipper" (Deezer Session)	4:59
7.	"The Loving Cup" (Deezer Session)	3:39
8.	"Nuit 7 á 52" (Deezer Session)	3:46
Total length:		31:04

== Chart performance ==
=== Single ===
Chart (2014)	Peak position
Belgium (Ultratip Flanders)	11
France (SNEP)	75

=== EP ===
Chart (2013)	Peak position
French Albums (SNEP)	130

== Release history ==
Region	Date	Format	Label
Various	3 June 2013	Digital download; CD	Because Music
