= Glory (Perfume Genius album) =

2025 studio album by Perfume Genius

Studio album by Perfume Genius
- Released: March 28, 2025
- Studio: Sound City Studios (Los Angeles)
- Length: 41:15
- Label: Matador
- Producer: Blake Mills

Perfume Genius chronology
Ugly Season (2022)	Glory (2025)

Singles from Glory
- 1. "It's a Mirror" Released: January 15, 2025; 2. "No Front Teeth" Released: February 19, 2025; 3. "Clean Heart" Released: March 25, 2025

Glory is the seventh studio album by American musician Perfume Genius, released on March 28, 2025, through Matador Records. It features contributions from his partner Alan Wyffels and producer Blake Mills, and a guest appearance by Aldous Harding.

== Recording ==
The album was recorded at Sound City Studios in Los Angeles. Compared to Mike Hadreas's previous albums, Glory was a more collaborative effort and enlisted a band composed of Hadreas's longtime partner and collaborator, the multi-instrumentalist Alan Wyfells; producer Blake Mills; and drummers Tim Carr and Jim Keltner, bassist Pat Kelly, and guitarists Meg Duffy and Greg Uhlmann.

== Release ==
The album was announced on January 15, 2025, alongside the release of its first single "It's a Mirror" and an accompanying music video directed by longtime collaborator Cody Critcheloe. A tour in support of the album was announced the same day, featuring dates at The Fillmore, Kilby Block Party, The Van Buren, Emo's, the 9:30 Club, Union Transfer, Brooklyn Paramount, The Vic Theatre, First Avenue, The Showbox and Revolution Hall. "No Front Teeth", featuring Aldous Harding, was released as the album's second single on February 19, 2025, also accompanied by a video directed by Critcheloe. "Clean Heart" was released as the album's third single on March 25, 2025.

== Critical reception ==
Glory ratings
Aggregate scores
Source	Rating
AnyDecentMusic?	8.4/10
Metacritic	90/100
Review scores
Source	Rating
AllMusic	4.5/5 stars
The A.V. Club	A−
Clash	9/10
The Guardian	4/5 stars
Mojo	4/5 stars
MusicOMH	5/5 stars
Paste	9.8/10
Pitchfork	8.0/10
Slant Magazine	4.5/5 stars
Uncut	9/10

At Metacritic, which assigns a normalized rating out of 100 to reviews from mainstream publications, Glory received an average score of 90 based on 17 reviews, indicating "universal acclaim".

In a 9.8 out of 10 review, Paste's David Feigelson wrote, "Mike Hadreas and his band vibrantly impress his shape into the most ineffable vacuum, and his seventh album might be his most spectacular demonstration yet—as it seamlessly updates familiar Perfume Genius concepts with unflinching curiosity, revealing itself as music full of lush, challenging paradoxes." Uncut's Daniel Dylan Wray wrote, "This is an album unafraid to be quiet and vulnerable yet it remains consistently captivating, and within its subtle restraint exists a record as sonically rich as it is lyrically bold." John Amen of Beats Per Minute gave the album a score of 83% and wrote, "With Glory, Hadreas continues to hone juxtapositions of heaviness and buoyancy, yoking the spacious and the claustrophobic. More specifically, he explores the dynamics of entanglement and removal, melding objectivity, magical realism, and a literary bent". Concluding his 8-out-of-10 review for Exclaim!, Josh Korngut writes that Glory is "an album empowered by queer exhaustion — and instead of laying down to rest, it happily sets itself on fire".

The album was nominated for the Grammy Award for Best Album Cover.

== Track listing ==
All tracks are written by Mike Hadreas, except where noted.

Glory track listing
No.	Title	Writer(s)	Length
1.	"It's a Mirror"	Hadreas; Blake Mills; Alan Wyffels	3:32
2.	"No Front Teeth" (featuring Aldous Harding)	Hadreas; Wyffels	4:46
3.	"Clean Heart"	Hadreas; Wyffels	3:52
4.	"Me & Angel"		3:22
5.	"Left for Tomorrow"		3:39
6.	"Full On"		4:54
7.	"Capezio"	Hadreas; Mills	3:51
8.	"Dion"	Hadreas; Mills	3:18
9.	"In a Row"		3:23
10.	"Hanging Out"	Hadreas; Mills	4:21
11.	"Glory"		2:17
Total length:			41:15

== Personnel ==
Musicians

- Mike Hadreas – vocals (all tracks), piano (tracks 4, 8, 11), electric piano (9, 10)
- Blake Mills – production, mixing (all tracks); acoustic guitar (tracks 1–3, 6), drums (4), electric guitar (1–3, 6, 8, 9), piano (1, 6), bass (1), percussion (1, 2, 10), throat singing (1), upright piano (2), synth bass (2, 7, 9), synthesizer (3, 7–10), fretless guitar (5, 6, 8, 10, 11), slide guitar (7), organ (9), tenor bass guitar (9), harmony vocals (9), pedal steel guitar (10)
- Alan Wyffels – piano (tracks 1, 9), harmonium (1, 2), harmony vocals (1–3, 7, 10), celeste (3), grand piano (2), synthesizer (5), flute (6)
- Tim Carr – drums (tracks 1, 2, 5–7), percussion (2), harmony vocals (2)
- Meg Duffy – electric guitar (tracks 1, 2, 5–7, 9, 10), guitar effects (2, 9), harmony vocals (2), baritone guitar (7)
- Greg Uhlmann – electric guitar (tracks 1, 2, 6, 7, 9, 10), guitar effects (2, 6, 7) acoustic guitar (5)
- Pat Kelly – electric upright bass (tracks 2, 5–7)
- Aldous Harding – vocals (2)
- Jim Keltner – drums (tracks 3, 5, 8–10), hambone (3), drum fills (6)

Additional personnel

- Joseph Lorge – mixing, engineering
- Rachel Selch – assistant engineering
- Sebastian Reunert – assistant engineering
- Patricia Sullivan – mastering
- Cody Critcheloe – photography
- Andrew J.S. – art direction, design (at Éditions)
- Chase Booker – type design

== Charts ==
Chart performance for Glory
Chart (2025)	Peak position
Belgian Albums (Ultratop Flanders)	82
Portuguese Albums (AFP)	163
Scottish Albums (Official Charts)	42
UK Album Downloads (Official Charts)	17
UK Independent Albums (Official Charts)	17
