= Les Paradis perdus =

2015 single by Christine and the Queens

"Les Paradis perdus" ("the lost paradises") is a 1973 French song by Christophe, written by Christophe and Jean Michel Jarre. It reached no.20 on the French charts.

== 2015 cover version ==
"Paradis perdus"

Single by Christine and the Queens

from the album Chaleur Humaine
- Released: June 2015
- Recorded: 2014
- Genre: Europop
- Length: 3:35
- Label: Because
- Songwriters: Christophe; Jean Michel Jarre
- Producer: Christine and the Queens

Christine and the Queens singles chronology
"Christine" (2014)	"Paradis perdus" (2015)	"No Harm Is Done" (2015)

The 2015 cover version by Christine and the Queens interpolates American rapper Kanye West's 2008 single "Heartless". It was released as a digital download in June 2015 through Because Music as the fourth and final single from his debut studio album Chaleur Humaine (2014). A music video to accompany the release of "Paradis perdus" was first released onto YouTube on 14 October 2015 at a total length of three minutes and thirty-eight seconds.

== Track listing ==
Digital download
No.	Title	Length
1.	"Paradis perdus"	3:35

== Charts ==
=== Weekly charts ===
Chart (2014–16)	Peak position
Belgium (Ultratip Bubbling Under Flanders)	29
Belgium (Ultratop 50 Wallonia)	39
France (SNEP)	19

=== Year-end charts ===
Chart (2015)	Position
France (SNEP)	83

== Release history ==
Region	Date	Format	Label
France	June 2015	Digital download	Because Music
