= Ugly Season =

Studio album by Perfume Genius
- Released: June 17, 2022
- Genres: Chamber pop; baroque pop; industrial
- Length: 52:18
- Label: Matador
- Producer: Blake Mills

Perfume Genius chronology
Set My Heart on Fire Immediately (2020)	Ugly Season (2022)	Glory (2025)

Singles from Ugly Season
- 1. "Eye in the Wall" Released: September 13, 2019; 2. "Pop Song" Released: March 24, 2022

Ugly Season is the sixth studio album by American singer-songwriter Perfume Genius, released June 17, 2022, by Matador Records. The album was originally composed as a musical accompaniment for choreographer Kate Wallich's contemporary dance piece The Sun Still Burns Here.

== Short film ==
The album was accompanied by a short film titled Pygmalion's Ugly Season, directed by visual artist Jacolby Satterwhite, featuring the music of the album and an appearance by Perfume Genius.

== Reception ==
Ugly Season ratings
Aggregate scores
Source	Rating
AnyDecentMusic?	7.5/10
Metacritic	79/100
Review scores
Source	Rating
AllMusic	4/5 stars
Clash	8/10
Exclaim!	7/10
Gigwise	10/10 stars
The Line of Best Fit	8/10
NME	4/5 stars
Paste	8.4/10
Pitchfork	8.6/10
Slant Magazine	4.5/5 stars
Under the Radar	7.5/10

According to the review aggregator Metacritic, Ugly Season received "generally favorable reviews" based on a weighted average score of 79 out of 100 from 18 critic scores.

=== Year-end lists ===
Ugly Season on year-end lists
Publication	#	Ref.
Paste	23	
Pitchfork	26	
PopMatters	43	
Under the Radar	69	

== Track listing ==
All lyrics are written by Mike Hadreas, except "Scherzo" by Alan Wyffels and "Eye in the Wall" by Blake Mills.

Ugly Season track listing
No.	Title	Music	Length
1.	"Just a Room"	Hadreas; Mills; Wyffels	3:30
2.	"Herem"	Hadreas; Mills	7:21
3.	"Teeth"	Hadreas	4:13
4.	"Pop Song"	Hadreas	5:05
5.	"Scherzo"	Wyffels	3:51
6.	"Ugly Season"	Hadreas	4:40
7.	"Eye in the Wall"	Hadreas; Mills; Wyffels	8:42
8.	"Photograph"	Hadreas	4:41
9.	"Hellbent"	Hadreas; Mills	6:42
10.	"Cenote"	Hadreas	3:33
Total length:			52:18

== Personnel ==
- Perfume Genius – vocals, synthesizer (1, 3, 6–10), piano (1, 10)
- Blake Mills – production, mixing, bass (3, 7), bass drum (8), celesta (1, 2), chimes (3), clarinet (3, 5, 6), drum machine (2), synth guitar (2), drums (4), electric piano (1), guitar (2–4, 6–9), harmonium (1, 2, 10), Mellotron (2, 8), percussion (4, 6, 8), piano (1–4), synthesizer (3, 4), drum programming (7)
- Alan Wyffels – additional vocals (4), chimes (3, 4), flute (2), piano (3–5), synthesizer (7, 8)
- Rob Moose – strings, string arrangement (1)
- Sam Gendel – saxophone (2–4, 8)
- Matt Chamberlain – drums (7–9)
- Joseph Lorge – mixing, engineering
- Patricia Sullivan – mastering
- Andrew J.S. – art direction
- Nicasio Torres – paintings

== Charts ==
Chart performance for Ugly Season
Chart (2022)	Peak position
UK Independent Albums (Official Charts)	39
