= Put Your Back N 2 It =

Studio album by Perfume Genius
- Released: February 21, 2012
- Genres: Ambient; acoustic; pop; gospel; queer-pop
- Length: 32:23
- Label: Matador

Perfume Genius chronology
Learning (2010)	Put Your Back N 2 It (2012)	Too Bright (2014)

Singles from Learning
- 1. "Hood" Released: 2012; 2. "Dark Parts" Released: 2012; 3. "Take Me Home" Released: 2012

Professional ratings
Aggregate scores
Source	Rating
AnyDecentMusic?	7.9/10
Metacritic	81/100
Review scores
Source	Rating
AllMusic	4/5 stars
The A.V. Club	B
The Guardian	3/5 stars
The Independent	5/5 stars
The Irish Times	5/5 stars
NME	8/10
Pitchfork	8.4/10
Q	4/5 stars
Rolling Stone	3.5/5 stars
Spin	6/10

Put Your Back N 2 It is the second studio album by American musician Perfume Genius, released on February 21, 2012.

== Track listing ==
All tracks are written by Perfume Genius, except where noted.

No.	Title	Length
1.	"AWOL Marine"	2:48
2.	"Normal Song"	3:13
3.	"No Tear"	1:49
4.	"17"	2:30
5.	"Take Me Home"	2:40
6.	"Dirge" (words from “Memorial to D.C.; IV Dirge” by Edna St Vincent Millay)	3:16
7.	"Dark Parts"	3:09
8.	"All Waters"	2:10
9.	"Hood"	2:00
10.	"Put Your Back N 2 It"	3:10
11.	"Floating Spit"	3:15
12.	"Sister Song"	2:26

Bonus tracks
No.	Title	Length
13.	"Katie"	3:18
14.	"Rusty Chains"	3:20
