= Olivia Kaplan =

American musician

Olivia Kaplan is an American musician based in Los Angeles.

In 2021, Kaplan released her debut album Tonight Turns to Nothing.

In January 2025, Kaplan and Meg Duffy recorded a cover of "Birds" by Neil Young. They donated the proceeds from Bandcamp to organizations assisting with the 2025 Los Angeles wildfires.
