= Too Bright =

Studio album by Perfume Genius
- Released: September 23, 2014
- Genres: Lo-fi; pop; soul
- Length: 33:38
- Label: Matador
- Producers: Adrian Utley; Ali Chant

Perfume Genius chronology
Put Your Back N 2 It (2012)	Too Bright (2014)	No Shape (2017)

Singles from Too Bright
- 1. "Queen" Released: 17 July 2014; 2. "Grid" Released: 9 September 2014

Too Bright is the third studio album by American singer Perfume Genius, released on September 23, 2014.

The album reached number 77 on the UK albums chart and peaked at number 83 in the United States Billboard 200.

== Critical reception ==
Professional ratings
Aggregate scores
Source	Rating
AnyDecentMusic?	8.4/10
Metacritic	87/100
Review scores
Source	Rating
AllMusic	4/5 stars
The A.V. Club	A−
Entertainment Weekly	A−
The Guardian	4/5 stars
Mojo	4/5 stars
NME	8/10
Pitchfork	8.5/10
Q	4/5 stars
Rolling Stone	3.5/5 stars
Wondering Sound	4.5/5 stars

Too Bright has received critical acclaim. Metacritic, which assigns a normalized rating out of 100 to reviews from critics, gave the album an average score of 87, which indicates "universal acclaim".

Brandon Stosuy of Pitchfork gave the album a very positive review, stating, "A huge part of what makes the work so strong is the generous human spirit that bleeds into it, and Too Bright is the best example to date of the lengths he goes to confront his fears and demons. These songs feel less like songs and more like treasures, ones that fill you with power and wisdom, and as a result, Too Bright seems capable of resonating with, comforting, and moving anyone who's ever felt alienated, discriminated against, or "other-ized," regardless of sexual orientation." The album was given a score of 8.5 and was titled Best New Music.

== Artwork ==
The album artwork was shot by Luke Gilford and it showcases an androgynous Perfume Genius, described by Perfume Genius as "a man dressed as a woman dressed as a man".

== Conception and development ==
In an interview for Refinery29, Perfume Genius said, "I don’t know, for a long time I had been kind of constantly seeking reassurance and acceptance all over the place, and wanting to be taken seriously but waiting for someone else to do it for me, do you know what I mean?.” He explains that this was a more serious approach to making this album. Too Bright further explores topics on sexuality, empowerment, and queer identity.

== Track listing ==
No.	Title	Length
1.	"I Decline"	1:58
2.	"Queen"	3:50
3.	"Fool"	3:55
4.	"No Good"	3:49
5.	"My Body"	2:17
6.	"Don't Let Them In"	2:21
7.	"Grid"	2:39
8.	"Longpig"	2:50
9.	"I'm a Mother"	3:30
10.	"Too Bright"	3:25
11.	"All Along"	2:34
Total length:		33:38

Too Bright — Bonus Track Version
No.	Title	Length
12.	"Thing"	2:55

Too Bright — 10th Anniversary Edition
No.	Title	Length
12.	"Story of Love"	2:34
13.	"My Place"	3:00
14.	"When U Need Someone"	3:40

== Personnel ==
Main personnel

- Mike Hadreas – vocals, piano (1, 4, 6, 10), synth (3, 7, 9, 10), keyboards (2, 8), gong (5), handclaps (8), wurlitzer (11), composer, additional recording
- Adrian Utley – synth (2, 3, 5, 7, 8), bass guitar (2, 3, 5, 11), guitar (1, 11), winebox (5), fuzz bass (7), handclaps (8), engineer, mixing, producer
- Alan Wyffels – synth (3, 4, 8, 10), keyboards (2, 5), piano (6)
- Jim Barr – double bass (3, 4, 6)
- Herve Becart – drums (3, 5, 8)
- Ross Hughes – bass clarinet (3, 4, 10), saxophone (7)
- John Parish – drums (2, 7, 8, 11), shaker (5)

Additional personnel

- Greg Calbi – mastering
- Ali Chant – engineer, mixing, producer, handclaps (8)
- Alison Fielding – design
- Luke Gilford – photography

== Charts ==
Chart (2014)	Peak position
Australia Hitseekers (ARIA)	20
Belgian Albums (Ultratop Flanders)	26
Belgian Albums (Ultratop Wallonia)	64
UK Albums (Official Charts)	77
US Billboard 200	83
US Independent Albums (Billboard)	19
US Top Alternative Albums (Billboard)	10
US Top Rock Albums (Billboard)	24

== Pop culture ==
- "Fool" was featured in an advertisement for Chat GPT.
- "Too Bright" was featured on the ABC legal drama How to Get Away with Murder's second season finale.
- "Queen" was featured in the season one episode "eps1.3_da3m0ns.mp4" and season four episode "Hello, Elliot" of the USA Network television series Mr. Robot.
- "Queen" was featured on the Hulu television series The Great in the season two episode titled "Heads It's Me".
- "Queen" was featured as the closing song for the HBO series "Vice Principals" season 2 episode "Think Change".
- "Queen" was featured as the closing song for the Apple TV+ series Dark Matter season 1 episode 7 "In the Fires of Dead Stars".
