= Learning (album) =

Studio album by Perfume Genius
- Released: June 22, 2010
- Genre: Lo-fi
- Length: 29:04
- Label: Matador; Organs

Perfume Genius chronology
| Learning (2010) | Put Your Back N 2 It (2012) |

Singles from Learning
- 1. "Mr. Peterson" Released: March 1, 2010

Learning is the debut studio album by American singer-songwriter Perfume Genius. The album was released on June 22, 2010 by Matador Records.

Professional ratings
Aggregate scores
| Source | Rating |
|---|---|
| AnyDecentMusic? | 7.9/10 |
| Metacritic | 82/100 |
Review scores
| Source | Rating |
| AllMusic | 4/5 stars |
| Drowned in Sound | 9/10 |
| The Line of Best Fit | 9/10 |
| MusicOMH | 4/5 stars |
| Pitchfork | 8.2/10 |
| PopMatters | 7/10 |
| NME | 9/10 |
| Sputnikmusic | 4.5/5 |
| Under the Radar | 5/10 |
| The 405 | 7/10 |

== Track listing ==
All tracks are written by Perfume Genius.

Learning
| No. | Title | Length |
|---|---|---|
| 1. | "Learning" | 2:45 |
| 2. | "Lookout, Lookout" | 2:58 |
| 3. | "Mr. Peterson" | 2:53 |
| 4. | "Gay Angels" | 4:06 |
| 5. | "You Won't B Here" | 1:39 |
| 6. | "Write to Your Brother" | 1:53 |
| 7. | "No Problem" | 2:11 |
| 8. | "When" | 3:33 |
| 9. | "Perry" | 3:43 |
| 10. | "Never Did" | 3:23 |

Learning — Bonus Track Version
| No. | Title | Length |
|---|---|---|
| 11. | "Dreeem" | 2:26 |
| 12. | "Your Drum" | 1:42 |
| 13. | "Divine Faxes" | 4:58 |
