= No Shape =

Studio album by Perfume Genius
- Released: May 5, 2017
- Recorded: October–December 2016
- Studios: Zeitgeist; Boulevard; Desirée Ind.; (Los Angeles, CA)
- Genre: Experimental pop
- Length: 43:14
- Label: Matador
- Producer: Blake Mills

Perfume Genius chronology
Too Bright (2014)	No Shape (2017)	Set My Heart on Fire Immediately (2020)

Singles from No Shape
- 1. "Slip Away" Released: March 21, 2017; 2. "Go Ahead" Released: April 19, 2017

No Shape is the fourth studio album by American singer-songwriter Perfume Genius, released on May 5, 2017, through Matador Records as the follow-up to Too Bright (2014).

== Background ==
Hadreas was featured on the cover of the March–April 2017 issue of The Fader, which included a lengthy feature on Hadreas and his work on the next album. In the weeks following the article, Hadreas posted a number of video and audio clips teasing new music. On March 21, 2017, Hadreas announced his fourth studio album No Shape and released the first single "Slip Away", which was accompanied by a music video directed by frequent Björk collaborator Andrew Thomas Huang. The single was designated "Best New Track" by Pitchfork. On April 19, Hadreas released another single from the album called "Go Ahead" during a live Twitter Q&A with fans. On May 9, 2017, Perfume Genius released the video for "Die 4 You", directed by Floria Sigismondi.

== Reception ==
Professional ratings
Aggregate scores
Source	Rating
AnyDecentMusic?	8.1/10
Metacritic	84/100
Review scores
Source	Rating
AllMusic	4/5 stars
The A.V. Club	B+
The Guardian	4/5 stars
The Irish Times	4/5 stars
Mojo	4/5 stars
The Observer	4/5 stars
Pitchfork	8.8/10
Q	4/5 stars
Rolling Stone	3.5/5 stars
Vice	A−

=== Accolades ===
Publication	Accolade	Rank	Ref.
The Independent	The 30 best albums of 2017	4	
NME	NME's Albums of the Year 2017	24	
NPR	The 50 Best Albums of 2017	6	
Pitchfork	The 50 Best Albums of 2017	16	
Pitchfork	The 200 Best Albums of the 2010s	70	
Stereogum	The 50 Best Albums of 2017	4	
Uncut	Albums of the Year	70	
Vinyl Me, Please	The 30 Best Albums of 2017	16	

The album received a Grammy Award nomination for “Best Engineered Album, Non-Classical” at the 60th Annual Grammy Awards. Additionally, it was noted as one of the works designated under producer Blake Mills’ nomination for “Producer of the Year, Non-Classical.”

== Track listing ==
All tracks are written by Mike Hadreas, except where noted.

No Shape track listing
No.	Title	Writer(s)	Length
1.	"Otherside"		2:40
2.	"Slip Away"		2:45
3.	"Just Like Love"		3:14
4.	"Go Ahead"	Hadreas; Blake Mills	2:53
5.	"Valley"		3:09
6.	"Wreath"		4:26
7.	"Every Night"		2:47
8.	"Choir"		2:28
9.	"Die 4 You"	Hadreas; Mills	3:32
10.	"Sides" (featuring Weyes Blood)	Hadreas; Mills; Natalie Mering	4:52
11.	"Braid"		2:58
12.	"Run Me Through"		4:44
13.	"Alan"		2:46
Total length:			43:14

== Personnel ==
Performance

- Mike Hadreas – vocals (all tracks), piano (1, 7), synthesizer (3, 8, 12), Wurlitzer (9, 11), trumpet noises (9), congregation vocals (1)
- Blake Mills – piano (1, 2, 5, 6, 11, 12), synthesizer (1–4, 6, 7, 9, 12, 13), vocals (1, 6), marimba (2), guitars (2–6, 9, 10, 12), drums (2–4, 9, 10), percussion (2–4, 6, 9), tablas (3), bass (3–6, 10), baritone guitar (3), Marxophone (3), programming (4, 6), Mellotron (5), guitarron (7, 9, 12), organ (10, 11), kora (11), celeste (12), Omnichord (12), woodwinds (12), congregation vocals (1)
- Stuart Johnson – drums (2), percussion (2, 4), cymbals (3, 9),
- Rob Moose – violin (3–5, 7–10), viola (3–5, 7, 9, 10), string arrangements (3–5, 7, 9, 10)
- Alan Wyffels – backing vocals (6), synthesizer (7, 10), vocals (9, 13), Rhodes piano (12), piano (13)
- Natalie Mering – vocals (10, 11)
- Pino Palladino – bass (12)
- Chris Dave – drums (12), percussion (12)
- Shawn Everett – synthesizer (13)
- Joseph Lorge – congregation vocals (1)
- Clay Blair – congregation vocals (1)
- Becca Luce – congregation vocals (1)
- Chris Doerr – congregation vocals (1)

Production

- Blake Mills – production
- Shawn Everett – engineering, mixing
- Joseph Lorge – engineering
- Clay Blair – studio assistance
- Omar Yakar – studio assistance
- Brendan Dekora – studio assistance
- Patricia Sullivan – mastering
- Inez and Vinoodh – artwork
- Mike Zimmerman – design

== Charts ==
Chart (2017)	Peak position
Australia Hitseekers (ARIA)	12
Belgian Albums (Ultratop Flanders)	30
Belgian Albums (Ultratop Wallonia)	116
Irish Albums (IRMA)	90
New Zealand Heatseekers Albums (RMNZ)	9
Portuguese Albums (AFP)	40
Scottish Albums (Official Charts)	80
UK Albums (Official Charts)	96
US Billboard 200	185
