= Gregory Uhlmann =

American musician

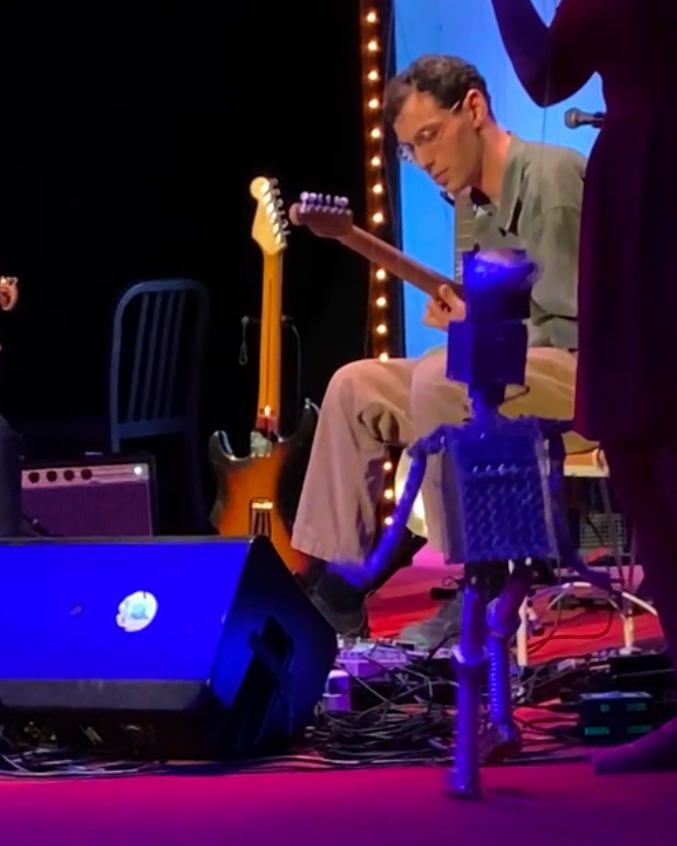
- Gregory Uhlmann performing in Duffy x Uhlmann at Bob Baker Marionette Theater in Los Angeles, California, in 2024

Background information
- Born: Chicago, Illinois, US
- Genres: Jazz; indie rock; avant garde; modern classical; art rock
- Instrument: Guitar
- Labels: Colorfield, Orindal, Northern Spy
- Member of: Duffy x Uhlmann, SML, Hand Habits, Fell Runner
- Website: gregoryuhlmannmusic.com

Gregory Uhlmann is an American musician, composer, and producer based in Los Angeles. He is active in solo and collaborative projects, and has played on records by Miya Folick, Meg Duffy, Perfume Genius, and many others.

== Background ==
Uhlmann is originally from Chicago, Illinois. He attended the California Institute of the Arts, studying jazz guitar and composition, and graduated with a BFA in 2014.

== Career ==
In February 2017, Uhlmann released his first solo album, Odd Job, on Dog Legs Music. Then in 2020, he released Neighborhood Watch, on Top Shelf Records. In April 2023, Uhlmann released his next album, Again and Again, on Northern Spy.

Uhlmann is part of many ongoing collaborative projects. In 2023, Duffy x Uhlmann, an instrumental experimental guitar duo of Uhlmann and Meg Duffy, released Doubles. In 2024, SML, a jazz quintet composed of Uhlmann, saxophonist Josh Johnson, synthesist Jeremiah Chiu, bassist Anna Butterss, and percussionist Booker Stardrum, released their first LP, entitled Small Medium Large.

== Discography ==
=== Solo albums ===
- Odd Job (2017)
- Neighborhood Watch (2020)
- Again and Again (2023)
- Small Day (2024)
- Extra Stars (2026)

=== Collaborative albums ===
- What I Am (as Fell Runner) (2022)
- Doubles (as Duffy x Uhlmann, in collaboration with Meg Duffy) (2023)
- Small Medium Large (as SML) (2024)
- Uhlmann Johnson Wilkes (with Josh Johnson and Sam Wilkes) (2025)
- How You Been (as SML) (2025)
- Spontaneous Music Live (as SML) (2026)
