= Jonathan (song) =

Single by Christine and the Queens featuring Perfume Genius

from the album Christine and the Queens
- Released: 8 October 2015
- Recorded: 2015
- Studio: Saint Germain, Paris; 123, London
- Genre: Synth-pop
- Length: 3:25
- Label: Because; Neon Gold; Atlantic
- Songwriter: Héloïse Letissier
- Producer: Ash Workman

Christine and the Queens singles chronology
"No Harm Is Done" (2015)	"Jonathan" (2015)	"Here" (2016)

"Jonathan" is a song by French singer and songwriter Christine and the Queens featuring vocals from American singer Perfume Genius. It was released as a digital download on 8 October 2015 as the second single from the English edition of his debut studio album, Christine and the Queens (2015).

== Music video ==
A music video to accompany the release of "Jonathan" was released onto YouTube on October 26, 2015 at a total length of three minutes and twenty-two seconds.

== Track listing ==
Digital download
No.	Title	Length
1.	"Jonathan" (featuring Perfume Genius)	3:25

== Charts ==
Chart (2015)	Peak position
Belgium (Ultratip Bubbling Under Wallonia)	26
France (SNEP)	120

== Release history ==
Region	Date	Format	Label
Worldwide	8 October 2015	Digital download	Because Music
