= Set My Heart on Fire Immediately =

2020 studio album by Perfume Genius

Studio album by Perfume Genius
- Released: May 15, 2020
- Studios: Sound City (Van Nuys, California)
- Genres: Art rock; pop
- Length: 50:42
- Label: Matador
- Producer: Blake Mills

Perfume Genius chronology
No Shape (2017)	Set My Heart on Fire Immediately (2020)	Immediately Remixes (2021)

Singles from Set My Heart on Fire Immediately
- 1. "Describe" Released: February 25, 2020; 2. "On the Floor" Released: March 16, 2020

Set My Heart on Fire Immediately is the fifth studio album by American musician Perfume Genius, released May 15, 2020 through Matador Records as the follow-up to 2017's No Shape. The album received critical acclaim upon release, with some critics calling it Hadreas' best work to date, praising its exploration of queer themes and homages to 80s pop and classic rock music.

Set My Heart on Fire Immediately is an art rock and pop album that features elements of baroque pop, art pop, synthpop, funk, alt-pop, shoegaze, ambient, psychedelic, R&B, acoustic pop, disco, swamp rock, chamber, doo-wop, industrial, and heartland rock.

== Background ==
In an interview with Jia Tolentino, Mike Hadreas described the album as influenced by his work with choreographer Kate Wallich on a 2019 dance piece titled "The Sun Still Burns Here". Hadreas composed numerous songs for the performance, with two singles, "Eye in the Wall" and "Pop Song" resulting, though neither was included on Set My Heart on Fire Immediately but its 2022 successor Ugly Season. Of the experience, Hadreas explained that the themes of embodiment in his prior music were complicated as dance felt "rebellious against [his] body." He explained that dancing "blew up this separation between [his] work and the world," resulting in changes to his songwriting, with songs now telling stories grounded in real-life settings and about real people. He cited Townes Van Zandt, Enya, and Cocteau Twins as influences on the new album.

== Critical reception ==
Professional ratings
Aggregate scores
Source	Rating
AnyDecentMusic?	8.8/10
Metacritic	91/100
Review scores
Source	Rating
AllMusic	4.5/5 stars
The Daily Telegraph	5/5 stars
The Guardian	5/5 stars
The Independent	5/5 stars
Mojo	4/5 stars
NME	4/5 stars
Pitchfork	9.0/10
Q	4/5 stars
Rolling Stone	4/5 stars
The Times	4/5 stars

Set My Heart on Fire Immediately received rave reviews. At review aggregator Metacritic, which assigns a normalized rating out of 100 to reviews from critics, the album received a weighted average score of 91 out of 100, based on 25 reviews, indicating "universal acclaim" and making it Perfume Genius' highest rated album on the website.

=== Accolades ===
Accolades for Set My Heart on Fire Immediately
Publication	Accolade	Rank	Ref.
BBC	The Best Albums and Songs of 2020	—N/a	
Billboard	Billboard's 50 Best Albums of 2020 – Mid-Year	—N/a	
Consequence of Sound	The 50 Best Albums of 2020	4	
Entertainment Weekly	The best albums of 2020... so far	—N/a	
Entertainment Weekly	The 15 Best Albums of 2020	13	
Gaffa	2020's 20 Best Foreign Albums	16	
Gigwise	The Gigwise 51 Best Albums of 2020	2	
The Line of Best Fit	The Best Albums of 2020 Ranked	7	
NPR	The 50 Best Albums of 2020	35	
Paste	Paste's 25 Best Albums of 2020 – Mid-Year	5	
Pitchfork	The 50 Best Albums of 2020	5	
Slant	The Best Albums of 2020 (So Far)	—N/a	
Spin	Spin's 30 Best Albums of 2020 – Mid-Year	—N/a	
Stereogum	Stereogum's 50 Best Albums of 2020 – Mid-Year	3	
Stereogum	The 50 Best Albums of 2020	15	
Time	Best Albums of 2020	6	
Under the Radar	Under the Radar's Top 100 Albums of 2020	7	
Uproxx	The Best Albums Of 2020 So Far	17	
Variety	Variety's Best Albums of 2020 – Mid-Year	—N/a	

== Track listing ==
All tracks are written by Mike Hadreas, except where noted.

Set My Heart on Fire Immediately track listing
No.	Title	Length
1.	"Whole Life"	3:53
2.	"Describe"	4:44
3.	"Without You"	2:35
4.	"Jason"	3:05
5.	"Leave"	3:05
6.	"On the Floor" (Hadreas, Alan Wyffels)	5:03
7.	"Your Body Changes Everything"	4:13
8.	"Moonbend" (Hadreas, Blake Mills)	5:21
9.	"Just a Touch"	3:28
10.	"Nothing at All"	4:27
11.	"One More Try"	3:01
12.	"Some Dream"	4:18
13.	"Borrowed Light"	3:22
Total length:		50:42

== Personnel ==
Musicians

- Mike Hadreas – vocals (all tracks), synthesizers (1, 2, 5, 7, 10, 12, 13), Wurlitzer (4)
- Blake Mills – guitar (1–3, 7–9, 11, 12), bass (1, 3, 4, 7, 9, 11), synthesizers (1, 4, 8, 10, 12, 13), drums (1), glockenspiel (1), synth guitar (6, 11), harmony vocals (6, 10, 11), organ (8, 10), piano (11, 12), synth drums (12), harmonium (13)
- Matt Chamberlain – additional drums (1), drums (4, 6, 7, 10, 12)
- Rob Moose – violin (1, 3–5, 9, 13), viola (1, 3–5, 9, 13)
- Alan Wyffels – piano (1, 12), organ (3, 9), harpsichord (4), synthesizers (5, 8, 12), harmony vocals (7), flute (8), Wurlitzer (12), Rhodes (13)
- Jim Keltner – drums (2, 3, 9, 11)
- Pino Palladino – bass (2, 6, 7)
- Gabriel Cabezas – cello (3, 4, 9, 13)
- Sam Gendel – synthesizers (4), saxophone (7, 8, 12), synth drums (7), drum machine (7, 10)
- Phoebe Bridgers – harmony vocals (6)
- Ethan Gruska – harmony vocals (6), vocals (6), percussion (6)

Engineers

- Blake Mills – production
- Joseph Lorge – engineering
- Greg Koller – engineering, mixing
- Patricia Sullivan – mastering
- Ian Sefchick – mastering

Artwork

- Camille Vivier – photographs
- Andrew J. S. – art direction

== Charts ==
Chart performance for Set My Heart on Fire Immediately
Chart (2020)	Peak position
Belgian Albums (Ultratop Flanders)	21
Portuguese Albums (AFP)	39
Scottish Albums (Official Charts)	19
UK Independent Albums (Official Charts)	7
US Independent Albums (Billboard)	34
US Top Album Sales (Billboard)	24
US Top Alternative Albums (Billboard)	18
US Top Rock Albums (Billboard)	45
US Vinyl Albums (Billboard)	21

== Remix album ==
Immediately Remixes

Remix album by Perfume Genius
- Released: March 12, 2021
- Length: 53:04
- Label: Matador
- Producers: Jaakko Eino Kalevi; A. G. Cook; Jim-E Stack; Planningtorock; Jenny Hval; Initial Talk; Boy Harsher; Nídia; Danny L Harle; Westerman; Actress; Koreless; Katie Dey

Perfume Genius chronology
Set My Heart On Fire Immediately (2020)	Immediately Remixes (2021)	Ugly Season (2022)

Singles from Immediately Remixes
- 1. "On the Floor (Initial Talk Remix)" Released: April 29, 2020; 2. "Without You (Jim-E Stack)" Released: December 3, 2020; 3. "Your Body Changes Everything (Boy Harsher Remix)" Released: January 14, 2021; 4. "Describe (A. G. Cook Remix)" Released: March 3, 2021

A remix album, titled Immediately Remixes (stylized as IMMEDIATELY Remixes), was announced on January 14, 2021. It was initially announced for release on February 19, 2021, however it was delayed until March 12, 2021. It received a limited vinyl release for Record Store Day 2021.

It was preceded by the singles, "On the Floor (Initial Talk Remix)", "Without You (Jim-E Stack Remix)", "Your Body Changes Everything (Boy Harsher Remix)", and "Describe (A. G. Cook Remix)", released April 28, 2020, December 3, 2020, January 14, 2021, and March 3, 2021, respectively.

=== Track listing ===
No.	Title	Length
1.	"Whole Life" (Jaakko Eino Kalevi Remix)	3:41
2.	"Describe" (A. G. Cook Remix)	4:23
3.	"Without You" (Jim-E Stack Remix)	3:22
4.	"Jason" (Planningtorock 'Jason there's no rush' Remix)	3:36
5.	"Leave" (Jenny Hval Remix)	3:37
6.	"On the Floor" (Initial Talk Remix)	3:37
7.	"Your Body Changes Everything" (Boy Harsher Remix)	5:06
8.	"Moonbend" (Nídia Remix)	4:42
9.	"Just a Touch" (Danny L Harle Harlecore Remix)	3:41
10.	"Nothing at All" (Westerman Remix)	4:27
11.	"One More Try" (Actress Remix)	5:58
12.	"Some Dream" (Koreless Remix)	3:28
13.	"Borrowed Light" (Katie Dey Remix)	3:26
Total length:		53:04
