= Marina Allen =

American musician

Marina Allen is an American musician based in Los Angeles, California.

== History ==
Allen released her first album, Candlepower, in 2021 through Fire Records. The album received positive reviews. In 2022, Allen released her second album titled Centrifics, through Fire Records In 2024, Allen announced her third album, Eight Pointed Star, which was released on June 7.
