= Meg Duffy =

American musician

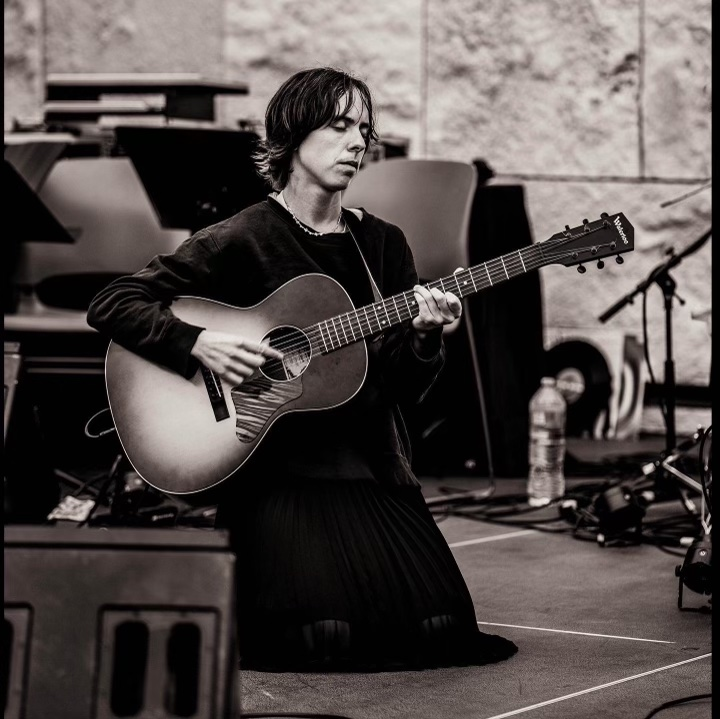
- Duffy performing at the Getty in Los Angeles, CA in 2022

Background information
- Born: Amsterdam, New York, U.S.
- Genres: Folk, indie folk, indie-rock
- Occupation: Musician
- Instruments: Guitar, slide guitar, piano, bass
- Years active: 2013–present
- Labels: Woodsist Records, Saddle Creek, Fat Possum

Meg Duffy is an American musician and guitarist who has played as a studio musician on records by the War on Drugs, Weyes Blood, Perfume Genius, Sasami, and William Tyler, among many others. Duffy was a longtime member of Kevin Morby's live band, is a current member of Perfume Genius's band, and is the sole member of indie-rock band Hand Habits.

== Background ==
Duffy is originally from Amsterdam, New York, and first started playing guitar at 17, although they had played drums since 5th grade. After graduating from high school, Duffy attended Schenectady County Community College for guitar performance as the only female student in the program. After graduating from college they briefly relocated to Albany, New York, prior to joining Morby's band in Los Angeles, California. Duffy previously dated Angel Olsen, and as of 2023, they have been in a relationship with a psychiatrist. Duffy uses non-binary gender-neutral pronouns.

== Session work ==
Duffy is credited on a number of albums as a session musician. They played a slide guitar solo on "Holding On" off The War on Drugs' Grammy-winning album A Deeper Understanding, and in 2019 they played on William Tyler's instrumental album Goes West. Duffy contributed guitar, slide guitar, and bass on the albums Fading Lines (2016) and European Heartbreak (2018) by Dutch artist Amber Arcades. Duffy played slide guitar on "Seven Words", a 2016 track from the album Front Row Seat to Earth by Weyes Blood. Duffy appeared on Mega Bog's albums Happy Together (2017) and Dolphine (2019). Duffy was a regular member of indie rock musician Kevin Morby's live band from 2015 to 2018, and played guitar, piano, and bass on his 2017 album City Music.

Duffy collaborated with music Jenn Wasner on Wasner's second album as Flock of Dimes, Head of Roses. They are also heavily featured in Sylvan Esso's expanded live band from their WITH tour, of which a full-length concert film and double LP WITH was released. Duffy also performed on the follow-up EP, WITH LOVE.

Their other latest credits include playing guitar on SASAMI's album Squeeze, Christian Lee Hutson's Quitters, Weyes Blood's And In the Darkness, Hearts Aglow, Mega Bog's Life, and Another, Hurray for the Riff Raff's The Past Is Still Alive, and Perfume Genius's Glory.

== Hand Habits ==
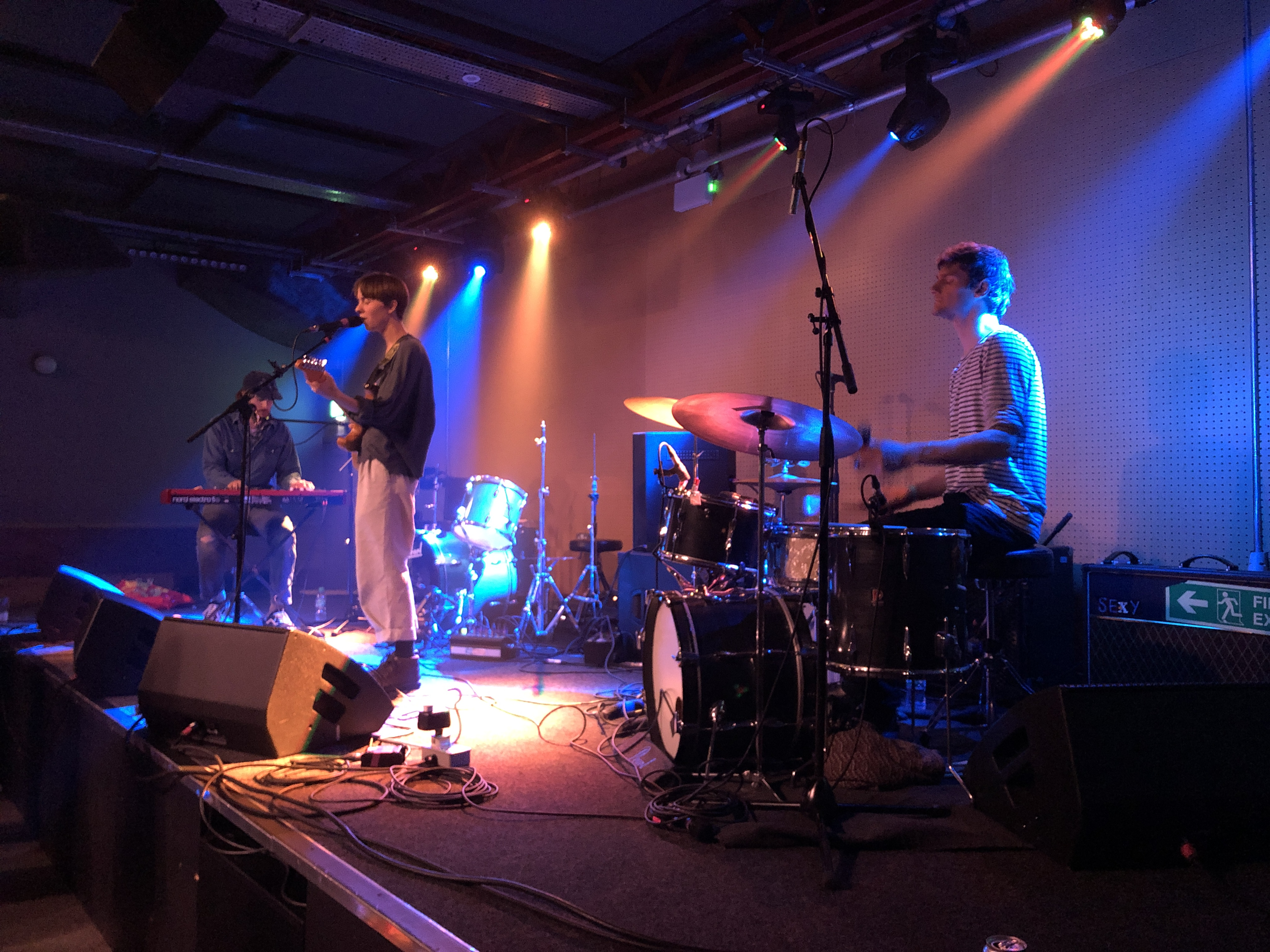
Meg Duffy (center) performing with Hand Habits at Brudenell Social Club, Leeds, UK in 2019

Duffy is the founder, primary songwriter, and only permanent member of the Los Angeles-based band Hand Habits. Their first release as Hand Habits was a 2012 split record titled Small Shifts (included as part of the pinky demos). On September 25, 2015, Hand Habits released double EPs titled This Sounds Like Nothing Tonight and This Sounds Like Nothing Before.

=== Wildly Idle (2017) ===
Their first full-length record Wildly Idle (Humble Before the Void) was released by Woodsist Records in 2017.

Wildly Idle was self-produced by Duffy and recorded partially in Saugerties, New York and partially at their home in Highland Park. Kevin Morby said about the album: "Wildly Idle feels incredibly intimate, like a secret between her and the listener. It hits soft, like warm water, and before you know it it is all around you – a bath, and Meg's whisper has made its way inside you". In reviewing the album for Pitchfork, Quinn Moreland wrote: "Duffy sings of romances come and gone without ever sounding jaded or spiteful; future love promises a mystery, a sensuality that's open like the road".

=== placeholder (2019) ===
On March 1, 2019, Hand Habits released their second studio album, placeholder, produced by Brad Cook in Justin Vernon's Wisconsin studio. Duffy stated that the songs on placeholder "are about accountability and forgiveness .... These are all real stories. I don't fictionalize much".

=== 2020 to 2021 ===
In 2020, Hand Habits released singles "Pictures of Flowers", a collaboration with Jess Williamson, and "Comfortable", a collaboration with Ryan Hemsworth. They released their EP dirt in February 2021, and in June of that same year, they released the singles "motherless" and "no reply", produced by Luke Temple and Jeremy Harris. In 2020, Duffy contributed to the benefit compilation The Song is Coming From Inside the House, organized by Strange Ranger to benefit Groundswell's Rapid Response Fund in light of the COVID-19 pandemic.

=== yes/and (2021) ===
Duffy's collaborative project with producer Joel Ford, yes/and, debuted with a self-titled album in July 2021.

=== Fun House (2021) ===
In August 2021, Hand Habits announced their upcoming album Fun House, and released the first single "Aquamarine". The album, which was produced by Sasami and engineered by Kyle Thomas, was released on October 22, 2021. In their positive review of the album, Pitchfork noted: "[Fun House] embodies all Duffy's gifts at once, bringing their virtuosic talent into their own wheelhouse, on their own terms." The FADER dubbed the album a "breakthrough," with Shaad D'Souza writing that the album is "lush, bright, in constant forward motion, in a constant state of change... Duffy's third and best record, it possesses some grimy, earthen magic."

=== 2022 ===
On September 14, 2022, Hand Habits released two new songs "Greatest Weapon," a song about "coming to grips with the dance of time," and "Under The Water" via Sylvan Esso's Psychic Hotline label. The latter track is a collaboration between Duffy and Sylvan Esso's Amelia Meath.

=== Sugar the Bruise (2023) ===
In March 2023, Hand Habits announced a six-track album Sugar the Bruise, which was released by Fat Possum on June 16. The record was co-produced by Duffy and Luke Temple, with additional production from Philip Weinrobe and Jeremy Harris, and was recorded at Panoramic House Studios in Stinson Beach, CA. Of the album, Paste Magazine writes, "these chapters are personal, droll, flushed and cresting; wondrously experimental and deftly consummate; a skyline of everydayness... Duffy paves a new slate, growing slowly into subversive song constructions and articulating how a body might begin tumbling through familiar habitats with a romantic, curious and joyous eye."

=== Doubles (2023) ===
In September 2023, Duffy x Uhlmann, an instrumental experimental guitar duo composed of Duffy and Gregory Uhlmann, released their first record, Doubles.

=== 2025 ===
In January 2025, Duffy and Olivia Kaplan released a cover of "Birds" by Neil Young. They donated the proceeds from Bandcamp to organizations assisting with the 2025 Los Angeles wildfires. In April 2025, Hand Habits featured on the Matt Berninger single "Breaking Into Acting" from his album Get Sunk.

=== Blue Reminder (2025) ===
Hand Habits released their sixth studio album, Blue Reminder, on August 22, 2025, via Fat Possum in LP, CD and digital formats. Pitchfork described the album as "conditioned by the awestruck pleasure of falling in love, and showcasing Meg Duffy's effortlessly acrobatic guitar playing, their latest LP is [...] their most sure-footed, adventurous collection of songs to date."

== Equipment ==
In a 2017 interview, Duffy stated they play a Fender Lone Star Stratocaster with a rosewood fretboard. The guitar, they stated, is set up with Seymour Duncan pickups in a HSS configuration (a single coil at the neck position, a single coil in the middle position and a humbucker at the bridge position.), also known as a "fat strat."

== Discography (as Hand Habits) ==
=== LP ===
- Wildly Idle (Humble Before the Void) (2017)
- placeholder (2019)
- yes/and (2021) (collaboration with Joel Ford)
- Fun House (2021)
- Fun House + Blueprints (2022)
- Blue Reminder (2025)

=== EP ===
- pinky demos (2012)
- Small Shifts (2014)
- This Sounds Nothing Like Tonight (2015)
- This Sounds Nothing Like Before (2015)
- Dirt (2021)
- Sugar the Bruise (2023)

=== Singles ===
- "Yr Heart" (2017)
- "Pictures of Flowers" (2020) (collaboration with Jess Williamson)
- "Comfortable"(2020) (collaboration with Ryan Hemsworth)
- "4th of July" (2021)
- "motherless" (2021)
- "no reply" (2021)
- "Aquamarine" (2021)
- "No Difference" (2021)
- "Graves" (2021)
- "Clean Air" (2021)
- "Greatest Weapon" (2022)
- "Under The Water" (2022) (collaboration with Amelia Meath)
- "Something Wrong" (2023)
- "Private Life" (2023)
- "The Bust of Nefertiti" (2023)
- "Wheel of Change" (2025)
- "Dead Rat" (2025)
- "Jasmine Blossoms" (2025)
- "Bluebird of Happiness" (2025)

=== Live albums ===
- Audiotree Live (2017)

== Additional credits and collaborations ==
Full list of additional credits/collaborations showing year, album, artist, and credit

Year	Album	Artist	Credit
2025	Wishbone	Conan Gray	Guitar (electric)
2025	Glory	Perfume Genius	Guitar
2024	Big For You	Zsela	Guitar
2024	The Cool Cloud of Okayness	Tara Jane O'Neil	Guitar Processor 10
2024	sentiment	Claire Rousay	Guitar
2024	The Past Is Still Alive	Hurray for the Riff Raff	Guitar (Electric); Background Vocals, Synthesizer; Slide Guitar
2023	End of Everything	Mega Bog	Guitar
2022	Squeeze	SASAMI	Guitar
2022	Quitters	Christian Lee Hutson	Guitar (Electric)
2022	Greeneville	Angel Olsen, Lucinda Williams	Vocals
2022	And in the Darkness, Hearts Aglow	Weyes Blood	Guitar
2021	yes/and	yes/and	Guitar (Electric), Loops, Guitar (acoustic), Guitar (baritone). Production
2021	Dirt	Hand Habits	Primary Artist
2021	Life, and Another	Mega Bog	Group Member, Guitar, Guitar (Electric)
2021	I Want the Door to Open	Lala Lala	Engineer
2021	It's Not So Hard	Chris Cohen	Guitar
2021	No Reply	Hand Habits	Guitar, Vocals, Composer, Synthesizer, Loops
2021	Motherless	Hand Habits	Primary Artist
2021	Neighborhood Watch	Gregory Uhlmann	Vocals
2021	Fun House	Hand Habits	Composer, Guitar, Guitar (Acoustic), Guitar (Baritone), Guitar (Electric), Guitar (Nashville), Slide Guitar, Vocals
2020	WITH LOVE	Sylvan Esso	Guitar
2020	WITH	Sylvan Esso	Guitar, Musician, Primary Artist
2020	The Fountain	Night Shop	Guitar
2020	Quarter-Life Crisis	Quarter-Life Crisis	Composer
2020	Beginners	Christian Lee Hutson	Guitar (Electric)
2020	You Think It's Like This But Really It's Like This	Mirah	Primary Artist, Producer
2019	Pictures of Flowers	Hand Habits / Jess Williamson	Primary Artist
2019	Vagabon	Vagabon	Guitar Loops, Slide Guitar, Textural Sampling
2019	Placeholder	Hand Habits	Producer, Bird Calls, Composer, Guitar, Guitar (Baritone), Loop, Organ, Percussion, Piano, Sounds, Synthesizer, Vocals
2019	Oh My God	Kevin Morby	Guitar
2019	Heartbreak City	Apex Manor	Engineer, Group Member, Guitars
2019	Gold Past Life	Fruit Bats	Guitar
2019	Goes West	William Tyler	Guitar (Electric), Loop
2019	Every Woman	Vagabon	Slide Guitar
2019	Dolphine	Mega Bog	Performer
2018	European Heartbreak	Amber Arcades	Slide Guitar, Bass
2017	Wildly Idle (Humble Before the Void)	Hand Habits	Arranger, Composer, Engineer, Mixing, Producer
2017	Yr Heart	Hand Habits	Primary Artist
2017	Holding On	The War on Drugs	Slide Guitar
2017	City Music	Kevin Morby	Guitar, Piano, Bass, Vocals
2017	A Deeper Understanding	The War on Drugs	Slide Guitar
2016	Front Row Seat to Earth	Weyes Blood	Slide Guitar
2016	Fading Lines	Amber Arcades	Guitar
2014	Small Shifts	Hand Habits	Primary Artist, Producer, Guitar, Bass, Vocals, Arranger, Mixing, Synthesizers, Samples
