= On the Floor (Perfume Genius song) =

Single by Perfume Genius

from the album Set My Heart on Fire Immediately
- Released: March 16, 2020
- Studio: Sound City (Van Nuys, California)
- Genre: Synth-pop
- Length: 5:04; 3:45 (radio edit)
- Label: Matador Records
- Composers: Alan Wyffels; Mike Hadreas
- Lyricist: Mike Hadreas
- Producer: Blake Mills

Perfume Genius singles chronology
"Describe" (2020)	"On the Floor" (2020)	"What a Difference a Day Makes" (2024)

"On the Floor" is a 2020 single by American musician Mike Hadreas, performing as Perfume Genius. The song was released on March 16, 2020, via Matador Records, as the second single from Set My Heart on Fire Immediately. The track was composed by Hadreas and Alan Wyffels, and features backing vocals from American musician Phoebe Bridgers.

"On the Floor" received acclaim from critics and appeared on several year-end lists. The song peaked at No. 32 on the Billboard Adult Alternative Airplay chart, making it Hadreas' first charting single.

== Background and lyrics ==
Hadreas explained that the song was "about a crush that turns into a really impersonal obsession". On the song's development, Hadreas stated:

When I was writing it, I was thinking about when you’re young and closeted, and you fall in love with somebody and that feels really warm and exciting, but also in combination with that you’re not supposed to love that person. When you’re queer, you’re taught that who you want to have sex with is the shameful part of you, and that’s before you’ve even done it yet. It’s just this weird combination—this feels like love, this feels like what I want and what feels natural, but then there’s this mix of shame and fear.

Hadreas has cited the music of Cyndi Lauper and Robyn as key influences on the track.

== Music video ==
A music video, directed by and starring Hadreas, was released on March 16, 2020. The video features Hadreas smoking a cigar and dancing alone in a field of dirt, later being joined by a doppelgänger (Tate Justas) who splits from Hadreas' body. The video received praise from critics. Flood Magazine writer Max Freedman wrote that the video presented masculinity as "not violent and closed-off but beautifully earthy".

== Performances ==
On July 21, 2020 Hadreas performed the song in an empty venue (due to social distancing regulations) at The Lodge Room in Los Angeles for The Tonight Show Starring Jimmy Fallon. A web-exclusive performance of "Jason" from the same venue was released the same day.

== Reception ==
NPR Music correspondent Marissa Lorusso described the track as "a joyous, warm dreamscape of a song". Jason Lipshutz in a year-end ranking for Billboard wrote that the song appeared as "slippery pop on the surface, but a closer look reveals an impressive high-wire act." Ranking it as one of Clash's top 25 songs of 2020, Sam Walker-Smart said that the song managed to "marry lyrics on longing and pent up desire with the kind of funk Stevie Wonder was throwing out in his golden age".

=== Rankings ===
Year-end rankings for "On the Floor"
Publication	Accolade	Rank	Ref.
Flood Magazine	The Best Songs of 2020	2	
Spectrum Culture	The 25 Best Songs of 2020	4	
DIY	DIY's Tracks of 2020	5	
The Guardian	The 20 Best Songs of 2020	9	
NPR Music	The 100 Best Songs of 2020	15	
Our Culture	The 25 Best Songs of 2020	15	
Treble	Top 100 Songs of 2020	23	
NME	The 50 best songs of 2020	43	
Billboard	The 100 Best Songs of 2020	81	

== Covers and remix ==
A remix by Tokyo-based producer Initial Talk was released on April 28, 2022. Initial Talk's version later appeared on the remix album IMMEDIATELY Remixes. Dan Wilson's "more gentle, guitar led" cover of the song was released on July 18, 2022. Wilson shared that he wished he had written the song himself.

== Personnel ==
Credits adapted from Apple Music.

=== Performance ===
- Mike Hadreas – vocals
- Blake Mills – harmony vocals, guitar, synthesizer
- Phoebe Bridgers – harmony vocals
- Ethan Gruska – percussion, vocals, harmony vocals
- Matt Chamberlain – drums
- Pino Palladino – bass

=== Production ===
- Blake Mills – producer
- Greg Koller – mixing engineer, recording engineer
- Joseph Lorge – recording engineer
- Patricia Sullivan – mastering engineer
