= Perfume Genius =

American musician (born 1981)

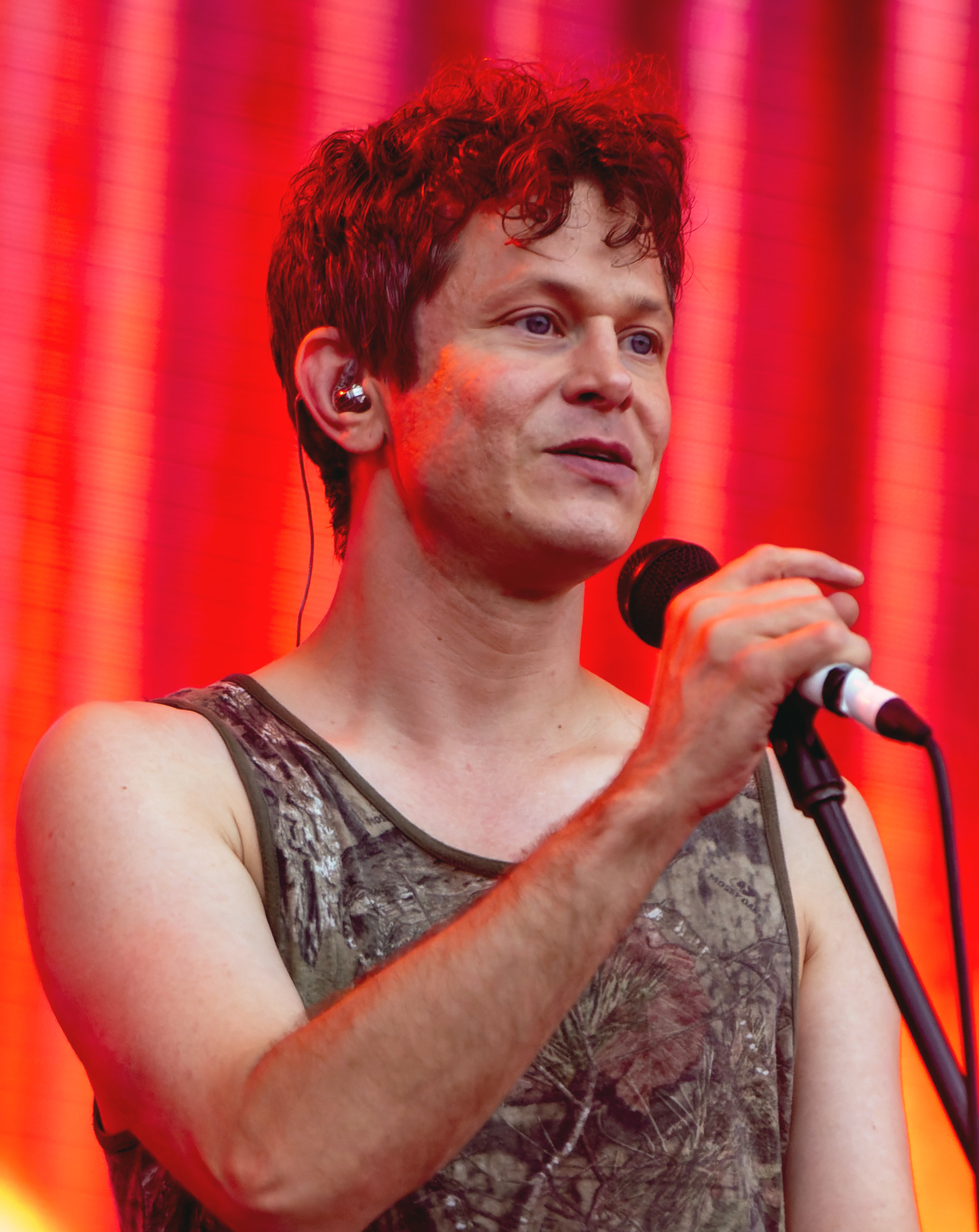
- Hadreas performing at All Points East in 2022

Background information
- Born: Michael Alden Hadreas; September 25, 1981 (age 45); Des Moines, Iowa, U.S.
- Genres: Indie pop; indie rock; alt-pop; chamber pop; post-rock
- Occupations: Singer; songwriter; musician
- Instruments: Vocals; piano
- Years active: 2008–present
- Labels: Matador; Turnstile
- Spouse: Alan Wyffels (m. 2025)

Michael Alden Hadreas (born September 25, 1981), better known by his stage name Perfume Genius, is an American singer, songwriter, and musician. Hadreas' indie music stylistically explores pop and rock with various influences and atmospheres. The themes in his music have included sexuality, his personal struggle with Crohn's disease, domestic abuse, and the dangers faced by gay men in contemporary society.

== Early life and education ==
Hadreas was born in Des Moines, Iowa on September 25, 1981. Age 6 or 7, he moved to the suburbs of Seattle, Washington. He is of Greek descent. His mother was a special education teacher and is now an assistant principal at a middle school. His parents divorced when he was a teenager.

Hadreas took piano lessons as a child.

Hadreas was the only openly gay student at his school, and he received death threats that were ignored by the school administration. He dropped out of high school during his senior year. Two years later, he was attacked by several young men in his neighborhood. He moved to Williamsburg, Brooklyn, and worked as a doorman for a club in the East Village.

== Career ==
In 2005, Hadreas returned home to Seattle and began recording music. In 2008, Hadreas set up a MySpace page under the name Perfume Genius, beginning his music career. The moniker comes from the genius perfume-maker in Tom Tykwer's 2006 movie Perfume: The Story of a Murderer.

=== Learning (2010) ===
Hadreas' debut album, Learning, was released on June 21, 2010, through Turnstile Records in Europe and Matador Records in the United States. Many of the tracks for Learning were recorded in Hadreas' home. The album received critical acclaim, including an 8.2 out of 10 score from Pitchfork.

Hadreas performed his first live show at The Vera Project in Seattle, where he opened for A Sunny Day in Glasgow. He brought on pianist Alan Wyffels to play for the album tour; the two would later date. Wyffels has continued to perform with Hadreas live and on recordings.

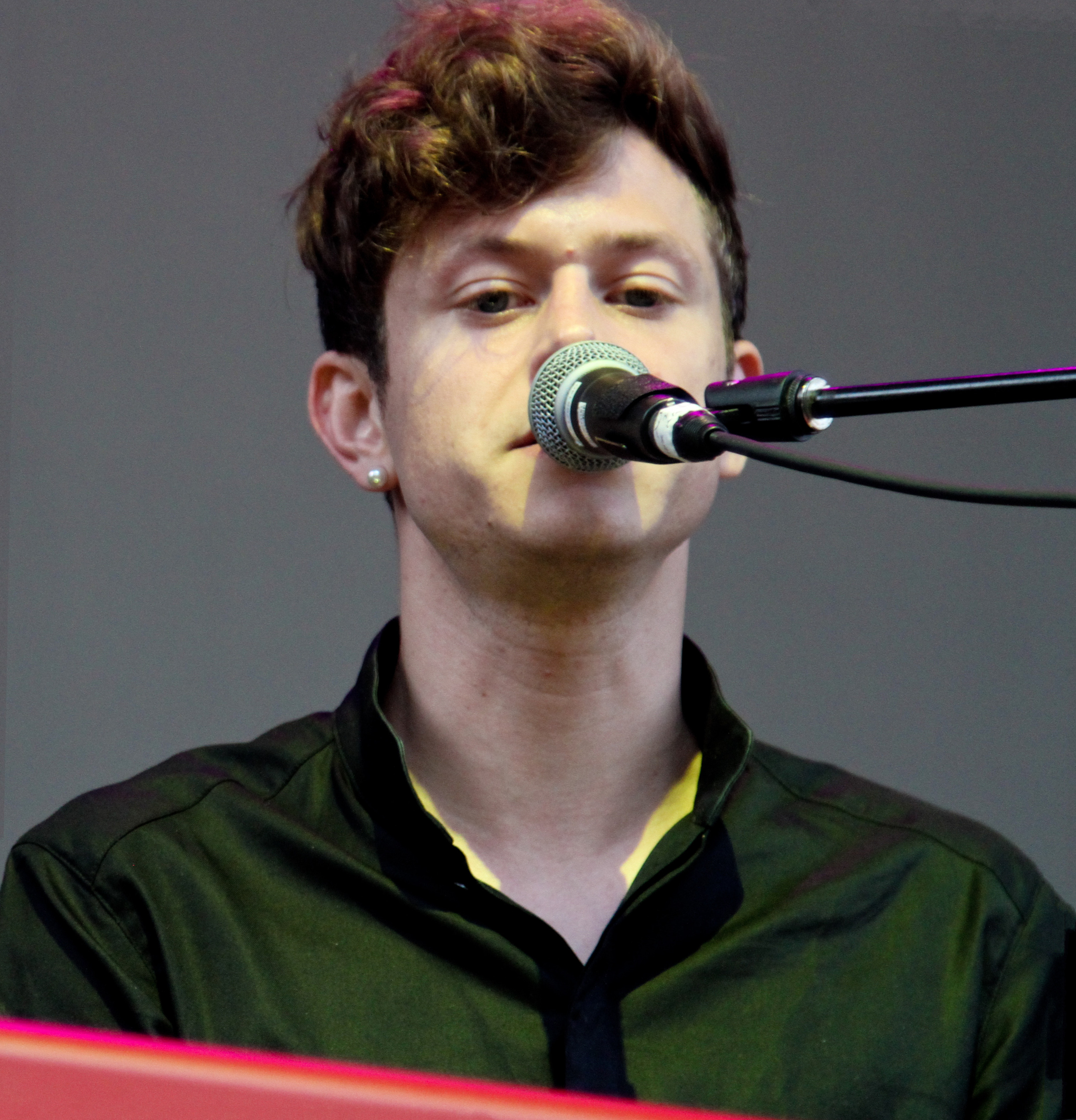
Perfume Genius performing in 2012

=== Put Your Back N 2 It (2012) ===
Hadreas' second album, Put Your Back N 2 It, was released on February 20, 2012. The album received positive reviews from critics.

The promotional video for the album, featuring Hadreas and pornographic actor Arpad Miklos embracing each other, was deemed unsafe for family viewing by YouTube.

In 2013, Hadreas featured on Cate Le Bon's album Mug Museum performing guest vocals on "I Think I Knew".

=== Too Bright (2014) ===
On September 23, 2014, Hadreas released his third album, Too Bright, which was co-produced by Adrian Utley of Portishead and Ali Chant. The album received positive reviews from critics.

Hadreas toured the album. On October 30, 2014, Perfume Genius appeared on The Late Show with David Letterman, performing "Queen". In April 2015, Hadreas was featured on the cover and in the pages of Hello Mr. In December 2014, Crack Magazine named "Queen" No.30 of their "Tracks of The Year 2014", stating that "Its bursting, fuzzy guitars and tight, commanding drum shots eloquently carried a message that Hadreas badly wanted the world to hear."

In 2016, Hadreas collaborated with Sharon Van Etten to contribute a cover of the Grateful Dead's "To Lay Me Down" to Day of the Dead, a charity tribute album curated and produced by members of the National and released by 4AD on May 20, 2016. All profits from the album supported the global fight against HIV/AIDS and related health issues through the Red Hot Organization.

On September 16, 2016, Hadreas released a cover of Elvis Presley's "Can't Help Falling in Love" in collaboration with Prada. The song was featured in the ad campaign for Prada's La Femme and L'Homme fragrances.

=== No Shape (2017) ===
Hadreas was featured on the cover of the March/April 2017 issue of The Fader, which included a lengthy feature on him and his work on his next album. In the weeks following the article, Hadreas posted a number of video and audio clips teasing new music. On March 21, 2017, Hadreas announced his fourth studio album No Shape and released the first single "Slip Away", which was accompanied by a music video directed by Andrew Thomas Huang. The single was designated "Best New Track" by Pitchfork. On April 19, Hadreas released another single from the album called "Go Ahead" during a live Twitter Q&A with fans.

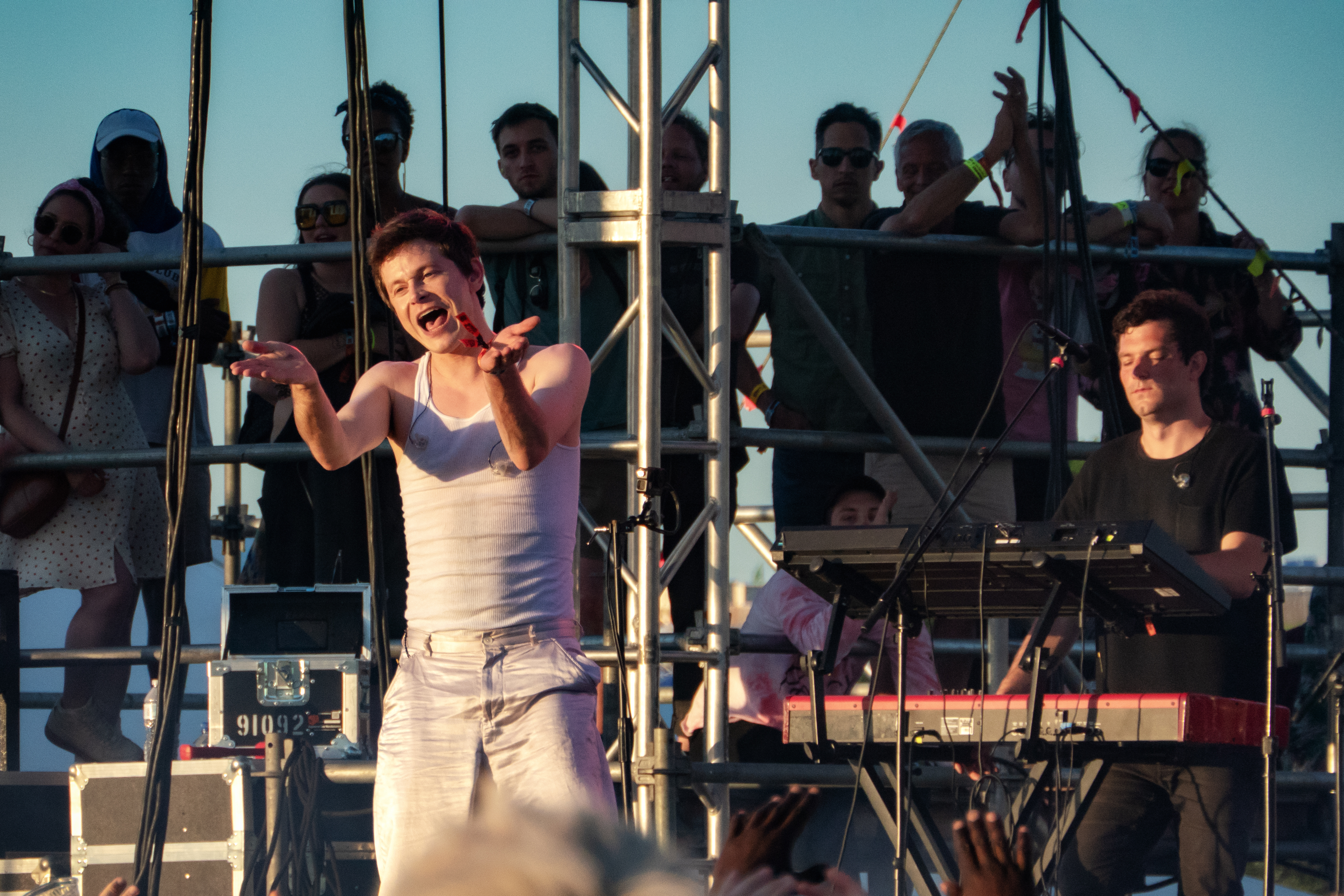
Perfume Genius performing live in 2018

No Shape was released via Matador on May 5, 2017. It was produced by Blake Mills and mixed by Grammy Award-winning engineer Shawn Everett. The album was praised by critics. Pitchfork awarded it an 8.8 and named it "Best New Album", deeming it "his most realized album yet, a tender and transcendental protest record of love and devotion." The Guardian commented that "No Shape sounds like a unique talent coming into full bloom."

On May 9, 2017, Hadreas released the video for "Die 4 You", directed by Floria Sigismondi. That same month, it was announced that Perfume Genius would curate a part of the line-up for Le Guess Who? Festival in Utrecht in November, for which he invited among others Aldous Harding, Mount Eerie, Weyes Blood, and Bulgarian women's choir Le Mystère des Voix Bulgares.

In 2019, the track Otherside was used in the trailer for the film The Goldfinch, adapted from the Donna Tartt novel of the same name.

=== Set My Heart on Fire Immediately (2020) and Ugly Season (2022) ===
On February 25, 2020, Hadreas released the single, "Describe". On March 16, he released another single, "On the Floor". Both songs were included on his album, Set My Heart on Fire Immediately, released on May 15, 2020.

On June 17, 2022, Hadreas released his sixth studio album, Ugly Season. The album was originally composed as a musical accompaniment for choreographer Kate Wallich's contemporary dance piece The Sun Still Burns Here.

In February 2024, Hadreas contributed a cover of What a Diff'rence a Day Makes—produced by Jack Antonoff and originally popularized by Dinah Washington—to the soundtrack of the Apple TV series The New Look.

=== Glory (2025) ===
On January 15, 2025, Hadreas announced his seventh studio album, Glory, and released the single, "It's A Mirror". The single was named "Best New Track" by Pitchfork. The album, released on March 28, 2025, was produced by Blake Mills, co-written with Hadreas's partner Alan Wyffels, and features artists including Aldous Harding, Jim Keltner, Meg Duffy, and Gregory Uhlmann.

== Musical style ==
Hadreas' musical style has been described as art pop, indie rock, baroque pop, indie pop, chamber pop, folk, pop, and glam rock.

== Personal life ==
Hadreas married long-time boyfriend and creative partner Alan Wyffels in 2025. Hadreas met Wyffels in 2009 through a mutual friend, and they started dating shortly after.

== Awards and nominations ==
Award	Year	Nominee(s)	Category	Result	Ref.
Best Art Vinyl	2017	No Shape	Award-Winning Cover	Nominated	
Best Art Vinyl	2022	Ugly Season	Award-Winning Cover	Nominated	
Best Art Vinyl	2025	Glory	Award-Winning Cover	2nd Place	
Grammy Awards	2018	No Shape	Best Engineered Album, Non-Classical	Nominated	
Grammy Awards	2023	"Spitting Off the Edge of the World"	Best Alternative Music Performance	Nominated	
Grammy Awards	2026	Glory	Best Album Cover	Nominated	
Libera Awards	2017	"Normal Song"	Best Sync Usage	Nominated	
Libera Awards	2018	"Wreath" video contest	Marketing Genius	Nominated	
Libera Awards	2018	"Die 4 You"	Video of the Year	Won	
Libera Awards	2019	"Slip Away"	Best Sync Usage	Nominated	
Libera Awards	2020	"Otherside"	Best Sync Usage	Nominated	
Libera Awards	2021	Himself	Best Live/Livestream Act	Nominated	
Libera Awards	2021	Set My Heart on Fire Immediately	Record of the Year	Nominated	
Libera Awards	2021	Set My Heart on Fire Immediately	Creative Packaging	Nominated	
Libera Awards	2021	Set My Heart on Fire Immediately	Marketing Genius	Nominated	
Libera Awards	2021	"Describe"	Video of the Year	Nominated	
Libera Awards	2023	"Spitting Off the Edge of the World"	Video of the Year	Nominated	
Libera Awards	2026	Glory	Best Pop Record	Nominated	

Year	Awards	Work	Category	Result	Ref.
2014	Rober Awards Music Poll	Himself	Best Pop Artist	Nominated	
2014	Rober Awards Music Poll	"Queen"	Best Promo Video	Nominated	
2015	Dorian Awards	"Queen"	Music Video of the Year	Nominated	
2017	Music Week Sync Awards	"I Can't Help Falling in Love"	Best Sync Online Viral Advert	Won	
2017	Rober Awards Music Poll	Himself	Best Songwriter	Nominated	
2018	GLAAD Media Awards	No Shape	Outstanding Music Artist	Nominated	
2020	Rober Awards Music Prize	Himself	Best Male Artist	Nominated	
2020	Rober Awards Music Prize	Himself	Songwriter of the Year	Nominated	
2020	Rober Awards Music Prize	"Describe"	Best Music Video	Nominated	
2021	GAFFA Awards	Himself	Best International Solo Act	Nominated	
2021	GAFFA Awards	Set My Heart on Fire Immediately	Best International Album	Nominated	
2021	Queerty Awards	"Jason"	Anthem	Nominated	

== Discography ==
- Learning (2010)
- Put Your Back N 2 It (2012)
- Too Bright (2014)
- No Shape (2017)
- Set My Heart on Fire Immediately (2020)
- Ugly Season (2022)
- Glory (2025)
