= Phoebe Bridgers discography =

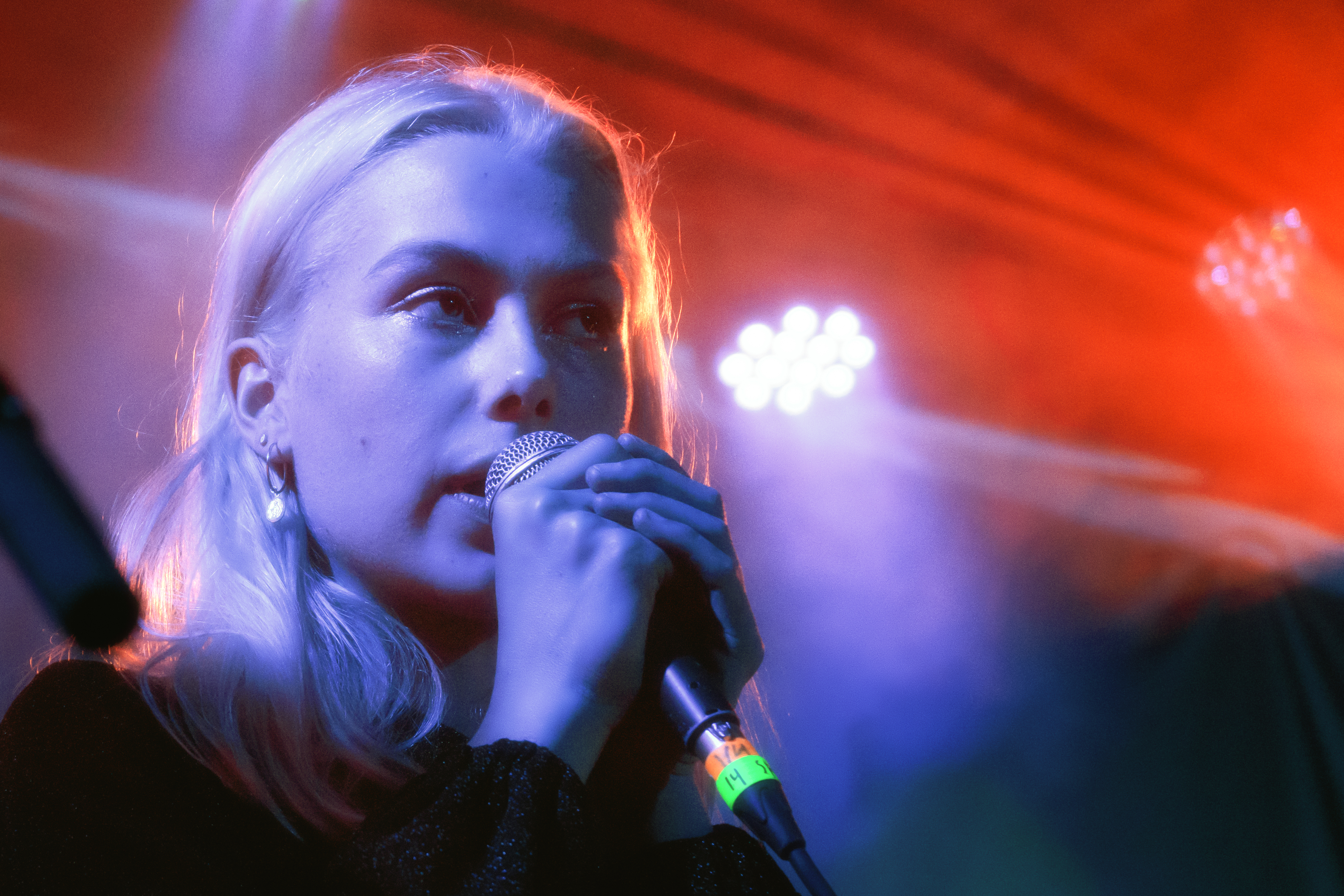
- Phoebe Bridgers in July 2018
- Studio albums: 3
- EPs: 9
- Singles: 22
- Music videos: 12
- Promotional singles: 7

The discography of American singer-songwriter Phoebe Bridgers consists of three studio albums, nine extended plays, 22 singles, six promotional singles, and 12 music videos. She has also released one extended play as part of Sloppy Jane, two extended plays and one studio album as a part of Boygenius, and one studio album as part of Better Oblivion Community Center.

== Studio albums ==
| Title | Album details | Peak chart positions | | | | | | | | | | Sales | Certifications |
| Title | Album details | US | AUS | BEL (FL) | CAN | GER | IRE | NLD | NZ | SCO | UK | Sales | Certifications |
|---|---|---|---|---|---|---|---|---|---|---|---|---|---|
| Stranger in the Alps | Released: September 22, 2017; Label: Dead Oceans; Format: LP, CD, cassette, digital download, streaming | 82 | — | — | — | — | — | — (Note: Stranger in the Alps did not enter the Dutch Album Top 100, but peaked at number 13 on the Dutch Vinyl 33 chart.) | — | 41 | — (Note: Stranger in the Alps did not enter the UK Albums Chart but peaked at number 84 on the UK Album Downloads Chart.) | UK: 155,419 (Note: United Kingdom sales figures for Stranger in the Alps as of August 2026.) | RIAA: Gold; BPI: Gold |
| Punisher | Released: June 17, 2020; Label: Dead Oceans; Format: LP, CD, cassette, digital download, streaming | 43 | 12 | 20 | 96 | 39 | 18 | 43 | 10 | 3 | 6 | UK: 199,813 (Note: United Kingdom sales figures for Punisher as of August 2026.) | RIAA: Gold; BPI: Gold; RMNZ: Gold |
| Lost Weekend | Released: August 14, 2026; Label: Dead Oceans | 2 | 1 | 3 | 3 | 2 | 2 | 2 | 1 | 1 | 1 | | BPI: Silver |
"—" denotes a recording that did not chart.

== Extended plays ==
| Title | EP details | Peak chart positions | | | |
| Title | EP details | US | US Alt | US Indie | US Rock |
|---|---|---|---|---|---|
| Killer | Released: March 31, 2014; Label: PAX AM; Format: Digital download | — | — | — | — |
| 2016 Tour CD | Released: 2016; Label: Self-released; Format: CD | — | — | — | — |
| Spotify Singles | Released: December 5, 2018; Label: Dead Oceans; Format: streaming | — | — | — | — |
| Inner Demos | Released: June 5, 2020; Label: Self-released; Format: Digital download | — | — | — | — |
| Copycat Killer (with Rob Moose) | Released: November 20, 2020; Label: Dead Oceans; Format: Vinyl, digital download, streaming | 78 | 9 | 7 | 12 |
| If We Make It Through December | Released: November 23, 2020; Label: Dead Oceans; Format: Digital download, streaming | — (Note: If We Make It Through December did not enter the Billboard 200, but peaked at number 99 on the Current Album Sales chart.) | — | — | — |
| Spotify Singles | Released: March 8, 2021; Label: Dead Oceans; Format: Streaming | — | — | — | — |
| Day After Tomorrow | Released: November 30, 2021; Label: Dead Oceans; Format: Digital download, streaming | — | — | — | — |
| So Much Wine | Released: November 17, 2022; Label: Dead Oceans; Format: Digital download, streaming | — | — | — | — |
| Live at Madison Square Garden | Released: October 29, 2026; Label: Dead Oceans; Format: Digital download, streaming | — | — | — | — |

== Singles ==
=== As lead artist ===
| Title | Year | Peak chart positions | | | | | | | | | | Certifications | Album |
| Title | Year | US | US Rock | AUS Dig. | BEL (FL) | CAN | EU Dig. | IRE | NZ Hot | SCO | UK | Certifications | Album |
|---|---|---|---|---|---|---|---|---|---|---|---|---|---|
| "Killer" | 2015 | — (Note: "Killer" did not enter the Billboard Hot 100, but peaked at number nine on the Hot Singles Sales chart.) | — | — | — | — | — | — | — | — | — | | Stranger in the Alps |
| "Smoke Signals" | 2017 | — | — | — | — | — | — | — | — | — | — | | Stranger in the Alps |
| "Motion Sickness" | 2017 | — | — (Note: "Motion Sickness" did not enter the US Hot Rock & Alternative Songs chart, but peaked at number 26 on the US Adult Alternative Airplay chart.) | — | — | — | — | — | — | — | — | RIAA: Gold; BPI: Platinum; RMNZ: Platinum | Stranger in the Alps |
| "Funeral" | 2017 | — | — | — | — | — | — | — | — | — | — | BPI: Silver; RMNZ: Gold | Stranger in the Alps |
| "Have Yourself a Merry Little Christmas" | 2017 | — | — | — | — | — | — | — | — | — | — | | If We Make It Through December |
| "Killer + The Sound" (with Noah & Abby Gundersen) | 2018 | — | — | — | — | — | — | — | — | — | — | | Non-album singles |
| "The Gold" (with Manchester Orchestra) | 2018 | — | — | — | — | — | — | — | — | — | — | BPI: Silver | Non-album singles |
| "Christmas Song" | 2018 | — | — | — | — | — | — | — | — | — | — | | If We Make It Through December |
| "7 O'Clock News/Silent Night" (featuring Fiona Apple and Matt Berninger) | 2019 | — | — | — | — | — | — | — | — | — | — | | If We Make It Through December |
| "Garden Song" | 2020 | — | 42 | — | — (Note: "Garden Song" did not enter the Flanders Ultratop 50, but charted as an "extra tip" on the Ultratip chart.) | — | — | — | — | — | — | RMNZ: Gold | Punisher |
| "Kyoto" | 2020 | — | 32 | — | — (Note: "Kyoto" did not enter the Flanders Ultratop 50, but charted as an "extra tip" on the Ultratip chart.) | — | — | — | — | 7 | — (Note: "Kyoto" did not enter the UK Singles Chart, but peaked at number 96 on the UK Singles Downloads Chart.) | BPI: Silver; RMNZ: Gold | Punisher |
| "I See You" | 2020 | — | — | — | — | — | — | — | — | — | — | | Punisher |
| "I Know the End" | 2020 | — | — | — | — | — | — | — | — | — | — | BPI: Silver; RMNZ: Gold | Punisher |
| "Savior Complex" | 2020 | — | — | — | — (Note: "Savior Complex" did not enter the Flanders Ultratop 50, but charted as an "extra tip" on the Ultratip chart.) | — | — | — | — | — | — | | Punisher |
| "If We Make It Through December" | 2020 | — | — | — | — (Note: "If We Make It Through December" did not enter the Flanders Ultratop 50, but peaked at number 31 on the Ultratip chart.) | — | — | — | — | 9 | — | | If We Make It Through December |
| "Nothing Else Matters" | 2021 | — | — | — | — | — | — | — | — | — | — | | The Metallica Blacklist |
| "That Funny Feeling" | 2021 | — (Note: "That Funny Feeling" did not enter the Billboard Hot 100, but peaked at number four on the Digital Song Sales chart.) | 21 | 10 | — | — | 14 | — | 14 | — | — (Note: "That Funny Feeling" did not enter the UK Singles Chart, but peaked at number 23 on the UK Singles Downloads Chart.) | | Non-album single |
| "Day After Tomorrow" | 2021 | — | — (Note: "Day After Tomorrow" did not enter the US Hot Rock & Alternative Songs chart, but peaked at number 17 on the US Rock Digital Song Sales chart.) | — | — | — | — | — | — | — | — | | Day After Tomorrow |
| "Sidelines" | 2022 | — | 35 | — | — | — | — | — | 22 | — | — (Note: "Sidelines" did not enter the UK Singles Chart, but peaked at number 99 on the UK Singles Downloads Chart.) | | Non-album single |
| "So Much Wine" | 2022 | — | — (Note: "So Much Wine" did not enter the US Hot Rock & Alternative Songs chart, but peaked at number 10 on the US Rock Digital Song Sales chart.) | 48 | — | — | — | — | — | — | — | | So Much Wine |
| "My Misery Will Bury You" (with Sloppy Jane) | 2022 | — | — | — | — | — | — | — | — | — | — (Note: "My Misery Will Bury You" did not enter the UK Singles chart but peaked at number 19 on the UK Physical Singles chart.) | | Non-album single |
| "Lost Boys" | 2026 | 85 | 21 | — | 49 | 84 | — | 51 | 4 | — | 50 | | Lost Weekend |
| "On Video" | 2026 | — | 37 | — | — | — | — | — | 18 | — | — | | Primetime Original Soundtrack |
"—" denotes a recording that did not chart.

=== As featured artist ===
| Title | Year | Peak chart positions | | | | | | | | | | Certifications | Album |
| Title | Year | US Rock | AUS Dig. | AUT | FRA | GER | NLD | POR | SCO | SWI Stream. | UK Down. | Certifications | Album |
|---|---|---|---|---|---|---|---|---|---|---|---|---|---|
| "Daylight" (Zander Hawley featuring Phoebe Bridgers) | 2015 | — | — | — | — | — | — | — | — | — | — | | I Wish I Was |
| "Until We Both Get Bored" (Zander Hawley featuring Phoebe Bridgers) | 2017 | — | — | — | — | — | — | — | — | — | — | | When I Get Blue |
| "Shame" (Storefront Church featuring Phoebe Bridgers) | 2017 | — | — | — | — | — | — | — | — | — | — | | Non-album single |
| "The Night We Met" (Lord Huron featuring Phoebe Bridgers) | 2018 | 25 | 45 | 27 | 136 | 69 | 39 | 59 | 64 | 27 | 91 | RIAA: 3× Platinum; AFP: 3× Platinum; BPI: 2× Platinum; BVMI: Platinum | 13 Reasons Why: Season 2 (A Netflix Original Series Soundtrack) |
| "Walking on a String" (Matt Berninger featuring Phoebe Bridgers) | 2019 | — (Note: "Walking on a String" did not enter the US Hot Rock & Alternative Songs chart, but peaked at number 24 on the US Alternative Digital Song Sales chart.) | — | — | — | — | — | — | — | — | — | | Non-album single |
| "Enough for Now" (Ethan Gruska featuring Phoebe Bridgers) | 2020 | — | — | — | — | — | — | — | — | — | — | | En Garde |
| "Miracle of Life" (Bright Eyes featuring Phoebe Bridgers) | 2020 | — (Note: "Miracle of Life" did not enter the US Hot Rock & Alternative Songs chart, but peaked at number 6 on the US Rock Digital Song Sales chart.) | — | — | — | — | — | — | — | — | — | | Non-album single |
| "Mountain Crystals" (Luminous Kid featuring Phoebe Bridgers) | 2021 | — | — | — | — | — | — | — | — | — | — | | at the end of the dream |
| "Runaway Horses" (The Killers featuring Phoebe Bridgers) | 2021 | — | — | — | — | — | — | — | — | — | — | | Pressure Machine |
| "Silk Chiffon" (Muna featuring Phoebe Bridgers) | 2021 | 45 | — | — | — | — | — | — | — | — | — (Note: "Silk Chiffon" did not enter the UK Single Downloads chart but peaked at number 95 on the UK Physical Singles chart.) | | Muna |
| "Atlantis" (Noah Gundersen featuring Phoebe Bridgers) | 2021 | — | — | — | — | — | — | — | — | — | — | | A Pillar of Salt |
| "Haligh, Haligh, A Lie, Haligh" (Companion version) (Bright Eyes featuring Phoebe Bridgers) | 2022 | — | — | — | — | — | — | — | — | — | — | | Fevers and Mirrors: A Companion |
| "I Felt a Funeral, In My Brain" (Andrew Bird featuring Phoebe Bridgers) | 2022 | — | — | — | — | — | — | — | — | — | — (Note: "I Felt a Funeral, In My Brain" did not enter the UK Single Downloads chart but peaked at number 36 on the UK Vinyl Singles chart.) | | Non-album single |
| "Your Mind Is Not Your Friend" (The National featuring Phoebe Bridgers) | 2023 | — | — | — | — | — | — | — | — | — | — | | First Two Pages of Frankenstein |
| "Pegasus" (Arlo Parks featuring Phoebe Bridgers) | 2023 | — | — | — | — | — | — | — | — | — | — | | My Soft Machine |
| "Wasted" (Rob Moose featuring Phoebe Bridgers) | 2023 | — | — | — | — | — | — | — | — | — | — | | Inflorescence |
| "Claw Machine" (Sloppy Jane featuring Phoebe Bridgers) | 2024 | — | — | — | — | — | — | — | — | — | — | | I Saw the TV Glow (Original Soundtrack) |
"—" denotes a recording that did not chart, or was not released in this territory.

=== Promotional singles ===
| Title | Year | Peak chart positions | | | | | | | | | Album |
| Title | Year | US | US Rock | AUS Dig. | CAN Dig. | EU Dig. | NZ Hot | SCO | UK Down. | WW | Album |
|---|---|---|---|---|---|---|---|---|---|---|---|
| "Georgia Lee" | 2019 | — | — | — | — | — | — | — | — | — | Come On Up to the House: Women Sing Waits |
| "Kyoto" (Copycat Killer Version) (featuring Rob Moose) | 2020 | — | — | — | — | — | — | — | — | — | Copycat Killer |
| "First Day of My Life" (Deezer Home Sessions) | 2020 | — | — | — | — | — | — | — | — | — | Non-album promotional singles |
| "Iris" (with Maggie Rogers) | 2020 | 57 | 5 | 5 | 2 | 5 | 16 | 42 | 3 | 122 | Non-album promotional singles |
| "Nothing Else Matters" | 2021 | — | — | — | — | — | — | — | — | — | The Metallica Blacklist |
| "Chinese Satellite" (live at Sound City) | 2022 | — | — | — | — | — | — | — | — | — | Non-album promotional single |
"—" denotes releases that did not chart.

== Other charted and certified songs ==
| Title | Year | Peak chart positions | | | | | | | | | | Certifications | Album |
| Title | Year | US | US Rock | AUS | CAN | IRE | NZ Hot | POR | UK | UK Indie | WW | Certifications | Album |
|---|---|---|---|---|---|---|---|---|---|---|---|---|---|
| "Waiting Room" | 2016 | — | — | — | — | — | — | — | — | — | — | BPI: Silver; RMNZ: Gold | Lost Ark Studio Compilation, Vol.8 |
| "Scott Street" | 2017 | — | — | — | — | — | — | — | — | — | — | BPI: Gold; RMNZ: Platinum | Stranger in the Alps |
| "Moon Song" | 2020 | — | — | — | — | — | — | — | — | — | — | BPI: Silver; RMNZ: Gold | Punisher |
| "Lovin' Me" (Kid Cudi featuring Phoebe Bridgers) | 2020 | — (Note: "Lovin' Me" did not enter the Billboard Hot 100 but did peak at number five on the Bubbling Under Hot 100.) | — | — | — | — | — | — | — | — | — | | Man on the Moon III: The Chosen |
| "Nothing New" (Note: Subtitled "(Taylor's Version) (from the Vault)") (Taylor Swift featuring Phoebe Bridgers) | 2021 | 43 | — | 31 | 22 | 25 | — | 158 | — (Note: "Nothing New" did not enter the UK Singles Chart, but peaked at number 44 on the UK Audio Streaming Chart.) | — | 33 | ARIA: Platinum; BPI: Silver; RMNZ: Gold | Red (Taylor's Version) |
| "Ghost in the Machine" (SZA featuring Phoebe Bridgers) | 2022 | 40 | — | 72 | 46 | — | — | 121 | — (Note: "Ghost in the Middle" did not enter the UK Singles Chart, but peaked at number 96 on the UK Audio Streaming Chart.) | — | 52 | RIAA: Platinum; BPI: Gold; MC: Platinum; RMNZ: Gold | SOS |
| "The Outside" | 2026 | — (Note: "The Outside" did not enter the Billboard Hot 100 but did peak at number 8 on the Bubbling Under Hot 100.) | 30 | — | — | — | 6 | — | — | 32 | — | | Lost Weekend |
| "Kill Me" | 2026 | 100 | 24 | — | 93 | 95 | 4 | — | — | 25 | — | | Lost Weekend |
| "The Governor's Waltz" | 2026 | 80 | 19 | — | 74 | 39 | 2 | — | 53 | 14 | — | | Lost Weekend |
| "Bobby" | 2026 | 93 | 23 | — | 85 | 49 | 5 | — | — | 21 | — | | Lost Weekend |
| "Lost Weekend" | 2026 | — (Note: "Lost Weekend" did not enter the Billboard Hot 100 but did peak at number 15 on the Bubbling Under Hot 100.) | 32 | — | — | 36 | — | — | 39 | 8 | — | | Lost Weekend |
| "Haunted" | 2026 | — (Note: "Haunted" did not enter the Billboard Hot 100 but did peak at number 6 on the Bubbling Under Hot 100.) | 28 | — | — | — | — | — | — | 39 | — | | Lost Weekend |
| "Panorama" | 2026 | — | 41 | — | — | — | — | — | — | — | — | | Lost Weekend |
| "Still Standing" | 2026 | — (Note: "Still Standing" did not enter the Billboard Hot 100 but did peak at number 23 on the Bubbling Under Hot 100.) | 37 | — | — | — | — | — | — | — | — | | Lost Weekend |
| "Liberty Tree" | 2026 | — | 43 | — | — | — | — | — | — | — | — | | Lost Weekend |
| "Never Going Back!" | 2026 | — | 44 | — | — | — | — | — | — | — | — | | Lost Weekend |
| "I Can't Wait" | 2026 | — (Note: "I Can't Wait" did not enter the Billboard Hot 100 but did peak at number 10 on the Bubbling Under Hot 100.) | 31 | — | — | — | — | — | — | 37 | — | | Lost Weekend |
| "As Above" | 2026 | — | 47 | — | — | — | — | — | — | — | — | | Lost Weekend |
"—" denotes a recording that did not chart, or was not released in this territory.

== Guest appearances ==
| Title | Year | Other artists | Album |
|---|---|---|---|
| "As Tears Go By" | 2013 | Noah Gundersen, The Forest Rangers | Sons of Anarchy: Songs of Anarchy Vol. 3 |
| "Prayer in Open D" | 2016 | —N/a | To Emmylou |
| "Waiting Room" | 2016 | —N/a | Lost Ark Studio Compilation, Vol.8 |
| "Do You Really Want to Not Get Better?" | 2016 | Joyce Manor | Cody |
| "Lyla" | 2018 | Big Red Machine | Big Red Machine |
| "LAX (Amazon Original)" | 2018 | Conor Oberst | —N/a |
| "Jesseye 'Lizabeth" | 2019 | Mercury Rev | Bobbie Gentry's The Delta Sweete Revisited |
| "On the Floor" | 2020 | Perfume Genius | Set My Heart on Fire Immediately |
| "Jesus Christ 2005 God Bless America" | 2020 | The 1975 | Notes on a Conditional Form |
| "Then Because She Goes" | 2020 | The 1975 | Notes on a Conditional Form |
| "Roadkill" | 2020 | The 1975 | Notes on a Conditional Form |
| "Playing on My Mind" | 2020 | The 1975 | Notes on a Conditional Form |
| "Roses/Lotus/Violet/Iris" | 2020 | Hayley Williams | Petals for Armor |
| "Lose This Number" | 2020 | Christian Lee Hutson | Beginners |
| "Unforgivable" | 2020 | Christian Lee Hutson | Beginners |
| "Get the Old Band Back Together" | 2020 | Christian Lee Hutson | Beginners |
| "Single for the Summer" | 2020 | Christian Lee Hutson | Beginners |
| "Favor" | 2021 | Julien Baker | Little Oblivions |
| "Seize the Day" | 2021 | Paul McCartney | McCartney III Imagined |
| "Going Going Gone" | 2021 | Lucy Dacus | Home Video |
| "Please Stay" | 2021 | Lucy Dacus | Home Video |
| "Runaway Horses" | 2021 | The Killers | Pressure Machine |
| "The Path" | 2021 | Lorde | Solar Power |
| "Solar Power" | 2021 | Lorde | Solar Power |
| "Stoned at the Nail Salon" | 2021 | Lorde | Solar Power |
| "Fallen Fruit" | 2021 | Lorde | Solar Power |
| "Leader of a New Regime" | 2021 | Lorde | Solar Power |
| "Mood Ring" | 2021 | Lorde | Solar Power |
| "Nothing New" | 2021 | Taylor Swift | Red (Taylor’s Version) |
| "St. Ides Heaven" (Companion Version) | 2022 | Bright Eyes | Letting Off the Happiness: A Companion |
| "Haligh, Haligh, a Lie, Haligh" (Companion Version) | 2022 | Bright Eyes | Fevers and Mirrors: A Companion |
| "A Scale, a Mirror and Those Indifferent Clocks" (Companion Version) | 2022 | Bright Eyes | Fevers and Mirrors: A Companion |
| "When the Curious Girl Realizes She Is Under Glass" (Companion Version) | 2022 | Bright Eyes | Fevers and Mirrors: A Companion |
| "A Spindle, a Darkness, a Fever, and a Necklace" (Companion Version) | 2022 | Bright Eyes | Fevers and Mirrors: A Companion |
| "Goodbye to Love" | 2022 | —N/a | Minions: Rise of Gru (Original Motion Picture Soundtrack) |
| "Ghost in the Machine" | 2022 | SZA | SOS |
| "Stonecatcher" | 2022 | Marcus Mumford | Self-Titled |
| "This Isn't Helping" | 2023 | The National | First Two Pages of Frankenstein |
| "Your Mind Is Not Your Friend" | 2023 | The National | First Two Pages of Frankenstein |
| "Laugh Track" | 2023 | The National | Laugh Track |
| "Modigliani" | 2025 | Lucy Dacus | Forever Is a Feeling |
| "Forever Is a Feeling" | 2025 | Lucy Dacus | Forever Is a Feeling |

== Songwriting and production credits ==
| Title | Year | Artist | Album |
|---|---|---|---|
| "Shame" | 2017 | Lukas Frank | Non-album single |
| "Walking on a String" | 2019 | Matt Berninger | Non-album single |
| "Canada" | 2020 | Lauv featuring Alessia Cara | How I'm Feeling |
| "Lovin' Me" | 2020 | Kid Cudi | Man on the Moon III: The Chosen |
| "Atheist" | 2020 | Christian Lee Hutson | Beginners |
| "Talk" | 2020 | Christian Lee Hutson | Beginners |
| "Lose This Number" | 2020 | Christian Lee Hutson | Beginners |
| "Unforgivable" | 2020 | Christian Lee Hutson | Beginners |
| "Northsiders" | 2020 | Christian Lee Hutson | Beginners |
| "Twin Soul" | 2020 | Christian Lee Hutson | Beginners |
| "Seven Lakes" | 2020 | Christian Lee Hutson | Beginners |
| "Get the Old Band Back Together" | 2020 | Christian Lee Hutson | Beginners |
| "Keep You Down" | 2020 | Christian Lee Hutson | Beginners |
| "Single for the Summer" | 2020 | Christian Lee Hutson | Beginners |
| "Strawberry Lemonade" | 2022 | Christian Lee Hutson | Quitters |
| "Endangered Birds" | 2022 | Christian Lee Hutson | Quitters |
| "Rubberneckers" | 2022 | Christian Lee Hutson | Quitters |
| "Sitting Up with a Sick Friend" | 2022 | Christian Lee Hutson | Quitters |
| "Age Difference" | 2022 | Christian Lee Hutson | Quitters |
| "Blank Check" | 2022 | Christian Lee Hutson | Quitters |
| "Cherry" | 2022 | Christian Lee Hutson | Quitters |
| "State Bird" | 2022 | Christian Lee Hutson | Quitters |
| "Teddy's Song" | 2022 | Christian Lee Hutson | Quitters |
| "Black Cat" | 2022 | Christian Lee Hutson | Quitters |
| "Creature Feature" | 2022 | Christian Lee Hutson | Quitters |
| "OCDemon" | 2022 | Christian Lee Hutson | Quitters |
| "Triple Axel" | 2022 | Christian Lee Hutson | Quitters |
| "Tiger" | 2024 | Christian Lee Hutson | Paradise Pop. 10 |
| "Carousel Horses" | 2024 | Christian Lee Hutson | Paradise Pop. 10 |
| "Autopilot" | 2024 | Christian Lee Hutson | Paradise Pop. 10 |
| "Water Ballet" | 2024 | Christian Lee Hutson | Paradise Pop. 10 |
| "Candyland" | 2024 | Christian Lee Hutson | Paradise Pop. 10 |
| "Flamingos" | 2024 | Christian Lee Hutson | Paradise Pop. 10 |
| "Fan Fiction" | 2024 | Christian Lee Hutson | Paradise Pop. 10 |
| "After Hours" | 2024 | Christian Lee Hutson | Paradise Pop. 10 |
| "Skeleton Crew" | 2024 | Christian Lee Hutson | Paradise Pop. 10 |
| "Beauty School" | 2024 | Christian Lee Hutson | Paradise Pop. 10 |

== Music videos ==
| Title | Year | Director | Ref |
|---|---|---|---|
| "Waiting Room" | 2013 | Phil Lee | |
| "Chelsea" | 2014 | Leonardo Lawrence | |
| "Smoke Signals" | 2017 | Unknown | |
| "Motion Sickness" | 2017 | Justin Mitchell | |
| "Would You Rather" | 2017 | Jackson Bridgers | |
| "Scott Street" | 2018 | Alex Lill | |
| "Killer" | 2018 | Gus Black | |
| "Garden Song" | 2020 | Jackson Bridgers | |
| "Kyoto" | 2020 | Nina Ljeti | |
| "I Know the End" | 2020 | Alissa Torvinen | |
| "Savior Complex" | 2020 | Phoebe Waller-Bridge | |
| "Sidelines" | 2022 | Jackson Bridgers | |
| "Lost Boys" | 2026 | Lance Oppenheim & Pablo Rochat | |
| "I Can't Wait" | 2026 | Pablo Rochat & Chris Maggio | |

== As part of other groups ==
=== Sloppy Jane ===
Demo albums

- Totally Limbless (2014)
- Burger Radio (2014)

Extended plays

- Sure-Tuff (2015)

=== Boygenius ===
Studio albums

- The Record (2023)

Extended plays

- Boygenius (2018)
- Boygenius Demos (2020)
- The Rest (2023)

=== Better Oblivion Community Center ===
- Better Oblivion Community Center (2019, with Conor Oberst)
