= Reunion Tour (Phoebe Bridgers) =

2021–2023 concert tour

- Tour by Phoebe Bridgers
- Associated album: Punisher
- Start date: September 3, 2021
- End date: April 26, 2023
- Legs: 5
- No. of shows: 106

Phoebe Bridgers concert chronology
- Better Oblivion Community Center Tour (2019); Reunion Tour (2021–2023); The Tour (2023)

Reunion Tour was the second solo concert tour by American musician Phoebe Bridgers, in support of her second studio album Punisher. The tour began in St. Louis, Missouri, United States, on September 3, 2021, and concluded in Murfreesboro, Tennessee, United States, on April 26, 2023.

== Background ==
On April 9, 2020, Bridgers announced the release of her second solo album Punisher, which was released on June 17, 2020. Due to the COVID-19 pandemic, Bridgers was unable to tour the album for any of 2020. The 2021 portion of the tour was originally scheduled to take place in a mix of indoor and outdoor venues, but later moved to exclusively outdoor venues as a continued result of the pandemic. Bridgers announced additional US dates in 2022, as well as European dates. In 2023, Bridgers announced dates in Oceania and Asia.

== Opening acts ==
For the 2021 portion of the tour, American electronic pop group Muna and indie rock musician Bartees Strange opened some of the non-festival September dates. The Philadelphia date was opened by musicians Mick Flannery and Susan O'Neill together. The Berkeley date was opened by Julien Baker, billed as a special guest. Charlie Hickey opened night one of the Los Angeles shows, and Matty Healy of The 1975 opened the second show.

The roster of Bridgers' record label Saddest Factory Records, consisting of Muna, Charlie Hickey, Claud and Sloppy Jane, along with Christian Lee Hutson opened the tour for the 2022 North American dates.

== Set list ==
This set list is representative of the show in Chesterfield, Missouri on September 3, 2021. It is not representative of all concerts for the duration of the tour.

1. "Motion Sickness"
2. "DVD Menu"
3. "Garden Song"
4. "Kyoto"
5. "Punisher"
6. "Halloween"
7. "Chinese Satellite"
8. "Moon Song"
9. "Savior Complex"
10. "ICU"
11. "Funeral"
12. "Smoke Signals"
13. "Scott Street"
14. "Graceland Too"
15. "I Know the End"

Encore

16. "That Funny Feeling" (Bo Burnham cover)

== Tour dates ==
List of concerts, showing date, city, country, venue, and opening acts
Date	City	Country	Venue	Opening acts
Leg 1 — North America
September 3, 2021	Chesterfield	United States	Chesterfield Amphitheater	Bartees Strange
September 4, 2021	Nashville	United States	Ascend Amphitheater	—N/a
September 5, 2021	Louisville	United States	Iroquois Amphitheater	Bartees Strange
September 8, 2021	Indianapolis	United States	TCU Amphitheater at White River State Park	Muna
September 10, 2021 (Note: The concert on September 10, 2021 at Union Park in Chicago is a part of Pitchfork Music Festival.)	Chicago	United States	Union Park	—N/a
September 11, 2021	Minneapolis	United States	Surly Brewing Festival Field	Muna
September 12, 2021	Madison	United States	Breese Stevens Field	Muna
September 14, 2021	Detroit	United States	The Aretha Franklin Amphitheatre	Muna
September 15, 2021	Lewiston	United States	Artpark Amphitheater	Harrison Whitford (Note: For the Lewiston show, Muna did not perform due to illness. Bridgers' bandmate Harrison Whitford filled in as opening act.)
September 17, 2021	Pittsburgh	United States	Stage AE	Muna
September 18, 2021	Columbus	United States	Express Live!	Muna
September 19, 2021	Charlotte	United States	Charlotte Metro Credit Union Amphitheater	Muna
September 21, 2021	Raleigh	United States	Red Hat Amphitheater	Muna
September 22, 2021	Philadelphia	United States	Skyline Stage at the Mann	Mick Flannery and Susan O'Neill
September 23, 2021 (Note: The concert on September 23, 2021 at The Woodlands in Dover is a part of Firefly Music Festival.)	Dover	United States	The Woodlands	—N/a
September 25, 2021 (Note: The concert on September 25, 2021 at Randalls Island in New York City is a part of Governors Ball Music Festival.)	New York City	United States	Randalls Island	—N/a
September 26, 2021	Boston	United States	Leader Bank Pavilion	Muna
September 27, 2021	Boston	United States	Leader Bank Pavilion	Muna
September 29, 2021	Cleveland	United States	Jacobs Pavilion at Nautica	Muna
October 2, 2021 (Note: The concerts on October 2 and 9, 2021 at the Zilker Park in Austin are part of Austin City Limits Music Festival.)	Austin	United States	Zilker Park	—N/a
October 4, 2021	Birmingham	United States	Avondale Brewing Company	Taylor Hollingsworth
October 9, 2021	Austin	United States	Zilker Park	—N/a
October 16, 2021	Berkeley	United States	Hearst Greek Theatre	Julien Baker
October 21, 2021	Los Angeles	United States	Greek Theatre	Charlie Hickey
October 22, 2021	Los Angeles	United States	Greek Theatre	Matty Healy
October 24, 2021 (Note: The concert on October 24, 2021 at the Central Park in Atlanta is a part of Shaky Knees Music Festival.)	Atlanta	United States	Central Park	—N/a
Leg 2 — North America
April 13, 2022	Phoenix	United States	Arizona Federal Theatre	Christian Lee Hutson
April 15, 2022 (Note: The concerts on April 15 and 22, 2022 at the Empire Polo Club in Indio are part of Coachella Valley Music and Arts Festival.)	Indio	United States	Empire Polo Club	—N/a
April 22, 2022	Indio	United States	Empire Polo Club	—N/a
May 13, 2022	Las Vegas	United States	The Amp at Craig Ranch	Sloppy Jane
May 14, 2022 (Note: The concert on May 14, 2022 at Library Square in Salt Lake City is part of Kilby Block Party.)	Salt Lake City	United States	Library Square	—N/a
May 17, 2022	Morrison	United States	Red Rocks Amphitheatre	Sloppy Jane
May 19, 2022	Irving	United States	The Pavilion at Toyota Music Factory	Sloppy Jane
May 20, 2022	Austin	United States	Moody Amphitheater at Waterloo Park	Sloppy Jane
May 21, 2022	Houston	United States	The Lawn at White Oak Music Hall	Sloppy Jane
May 22, 2022 (Note: The concert on May 22, 2022 at the Gulf Shores beaches in Gulf Shores is part of Hangout Music Festival.)	Gulf Shores	United States	Gulf Shores Beach	—N/a
May 24, 2022	Tampa	United States	The Cuban Club	Charlie Hickey
May 25, 2022	St. Augustine	United States	St. Augustine Amphitheatre	Charlie Hickey
May 27, 2022	Atlanta	United States	Cadence Bank Amphitheatre	Charlie Hickey
May 28, 2022 (Note: The concert on May 28, 2022 at the Waterfront Park in Louisville is part of Forecastle Festival.)	Louisville	United States	Waterfront Park	—N/a
May 31, 2022	Kansas City	United States	Starlight Theatre	Charlie Hickey
June 1, 2022	Omaha	United States	The Waiting Room Outdoors	Charlie Hickey
June 3, 2022	Milwaukee	United States	BMO Harris Pavilion	Charlie Hickey
June 4, 2022	Chicago	United States	Huntington Bank Pavilion	Claud
June 7, 2022	Toronto	Canada	RBC Echo Beach	Claud
June 8, 2022	Montreal	Canada	Parc Jean-Drapeau	Claud
June 9, 2022	Portland	United States	Thompson's Point	Claud
June 11, 2022	Washington, D.C.	United States	The Anthem	Claud
June 12, 2022	Washington, D.C.	United States	The Anthem	Claud
June 13, 2022	Asbury Park	United States	Stone Pony Summer Stage	Claud
June 14, 2022 (Note: The concert on June 14 and 15, 2022 at Prospect Park in Brooklyn is part of BRIC Celebrate Brooklyn! Festival.)	New York City	United States	Prospect Park	Muna
June 15, 2022	New York City	United States	Prospect Park	Muna
June 16, 2022	New York City	United States	Forest Hills Stadium	Muna
Leg 3 — Europe
June 20, 2022	Dublin	Ireland	Fairview Park	Ye Vagabonds
June 22, 2022	Glasgow	United Kingdom	Barrowland Ballroom	Mick Flannery
June 23, 2022	Glasgow	United Kingdom	Barrowland Ballroom	Pillow Queens
June 24, 2022 (Note: The concert on June 24, 2022 at Pilton in Somerset, England is part of Glastonbury Festival.)	Somerset	United Kingdom	Pilton	—N/a
June 25, 2022 (Note: The concert on June 25, 2022 in London is part of the British Summer Time Hyde Park Festival)	London	United Kingdom	Hyde Park	—N/a
June 26, 2022	Birmingham	United Kingdom	O_{2} Academy	Ye Vagabonds
June 28, 2022	Frankfurt	Germany	Batschkapp	Harrison Whitford
June 29, 2022	Hamburg	Germany	Fabrik	Harrison Whitford
June 30, 2022 (Note: The concert on June 30, 2022 at Darupvej in Roskilde, Denmark is part of Roskilde Festival.)	Roskilde	Denmark	Darupvej	—N/a
July 2, 2022 (Note: The concert on July 2, 2022 at Festivalpark in Werchter, Belgium is part of Rock Werchter.)	Werchter	Belgium	Werchter Festivalpark	—N/a
July 3, 2022 (Note: The concert on July 3, 2022 at Vakantiepark de Groene Heuvels in Ewijk, Netherlands is part of Down the Rabbit Hole.)	Ewijk	Netherlands	Vakantiepark de Groene Heuvels	—N/a
July 5, 2022	Milan	Italy	Carroponte	—N/a
July 7, 2022 (Note: The concert on July 7, 2022 at Kobetamendi in Bilbao, Spain is part of Bilbao BBK Live.)	Bilbao	Spain	Kobetamendi	—N/a
July 8, 2022 (Note: The concert on July 8, 2022 at IFEMA Feria de Madrid in Madrid, Spain is part of Mad Cool.)	Madrid	Spain	IFEMA Feria de Madrid	—N/a
July 9, 2022 (Note: The concert on July 9, 2022 at Passeio Marítimo de Algés in Lisbon, Portugal is part of NOS Alive.)	Lisbon	Portugal	Passeio Marítimo de Algés	—N/a
July 12, 2022	Munich	Germany	Tonhalle	Harrison Whitford
July 13, 2022	Berlin	Germany	Tempodrom	Harrison Whitford
July 14, 2022 (Note: The concert on July 14, 2022 at Dolní oblast Vítkovice in Ostrava, Czech Republic is part of Colours of Ostrava.)	Ostrava	Czech Republic	Dolní oblast Vítkovice	—N/a
July 16, 2022 (Note: The concert on July 16, 2022 at Montreux Jazz Lab in Montreux, Switzerland is part of Montreux Jazz Festival.)	Montreux	Switzerland	Montreux Jazz Lab	—N/a
July 17, 2022 (Note: The concert on July 17, 2022 at Hippodrome de Longchamp in Paris, France is part of Lollapalooza Paris.)	Paris	France	Hippodrome de Longchamp	—N/a
July 18, 2022	Cologne	Germany	E-Werk	Sloppy Jane
July 20, 2022	Amsterdam	Netherlands	AFAS Live	Sloppy Jane
July 22, 2022 (Note: The concert on July 22, 2022 at Henham Park in Suffolk, England is part of Latitude Festival.)	Suffolk	United Kingdom	Henham Park	—N/a
July 23, 2022	Manchester	United Kingdom	O_{2} Apollo	Sloppy Jane
July 24, 2022	Manchester	United Kingdom	O_{2} Apollo	Bartees Strange
July 26, 2022	London	United Kingdom	O_{2} Academy Brixton	Sloppy Jane
July 27, 2022	London	United Kingdom	O_{2} Academy Brixton	Bartees Strange
July 28, 2022	London	United Kingdom	O_{2} Academy Brixton	Charlie Hickey
July 29, 2022	London	United Kingdom	O_{2} Academy Brixton	Harrison Whitford
Leg 4 — North America
August 5–6, 2022 (Note: The concert on August 5–6, 2022 at Golden Gate Park in San Francisco is part of Outside Lands Music and Arts Festival.)	San Francisco	United States	Golden Gate Park	—N/a
August 7, 2022 (Note: The concert on August 7, 2022 at Avenue of the Saints Amphitheater in St. Charles is part of Hinterland Music Festival.)	St. Charles	United States	Avenue of the Saints Amphitheater	—N/a
August 18, 2022	Spokane	United States	Spokane Pavilion	Christian Lee Hutson
August 20, 2022	Vancouver	Canada	Orpheum	Christian Lee Hutson
August 21, 2022	Vancouver	Canada	Orpheum	Christian Lee Hutson
August 23, 2022	Redmond	United States	Marymoor Park	Christian Lee Hutson
August 24, 2022	Redmond	United States	Marymoor Park	Christian Lee Hutson
August 25, 2022	Troutdale	United States	Edgefield Amphitheater	Christian Lee Hutson
August 27, 2022	Paso Robles	United States	Vina Robles Amphitheatre	Christian Lee Hutson
August 28, 2022 (Note: The concert on August 28, 2022 at Brookside at the Rose Bowl in Los Angeles is part of This Ain't No Picnic.)	Pasadena	United States	Brookside at the Rose Bowl	—N/a
Leg 5 — Oceania, Asia, and added shows
January 30, 2023	Auckland	New Zealand	St Jerome's Laneway Festival	—N/a
February 4, 2023	Brisbane	Australia	St Jerome's Laneway Festival	—N/a
February 5, 2023	Sydney	Australia	St Jerome's Laneway Festival	—N/a
February 6, 2023	Sydney	Australia	Hordern Pavilion	Christian Lee Hutson
February 8, 2023	Melbourne	Australia	Margaret Court Arena	Christian Lee Hutson
February 10, 2023	Adelaide	Australia	St Jerome's Laneway Festival	—N/a
February 11, 2023	Melbourne	Australia	St Jerome's Laneway Festival	—N/a
February 12, 2023	Fremantle	Australia	St Jerome's Laneway Festival	—N/a
February 14–15, 2023	Singapore		Esplanade – Theatres on the Bay	—N/a
February 18, 2023	Kyoto	Japan	Kyoto Muse	—N/a
February 20, 2023	Osaka	Japan	Namba Hatch	—N/a
February 21, 2023	Tokyo	Japan	Zepp Diver City	—N/a
April 26, 2023 (Note: Bridgers was selected to perform for Middle Tennessee State University's annual spring concert at the end of the school year. The show was marketed and promoted as part of the Reunion Tour before Bridgers joined Taylor Swift's The Eras Tour as an opener.)	Murfreesboro	United States	Murphy Center	Harrison Whitford and Aslin

=== Cancelled shows ===
List of cancelled concerts, showing date, city, country, venue, reason for cancellation and reference
Date	City	Country	Venue	Reason
September 4, 2021	Manchester	United States	Bonnaroo	Flooding due to rain from Hurricane Ida
October 3, 2021	New Orleans	United States	Orpheum Theater	Unknown
