= Hush =

Hush may refer to:

== Film and television ==
=== Film ===
- Hush (1921 film), starring Clara Kimball Young
- Hush (1998 film), starring Gwyneth Paltrow
- Hush! (film), a 2001 Japanese film directed by Ryosuke Hashiguchi
- Hush!, a 2002 film directed by Viktor Kossakovsky
- Hush (2005 film), starring Tori Spelling
- Hush, a 2007 Australian short film directed by Dena Curtis
- Hush (2008 film), a British horror/thriller film
- Hush, also known as Ja saapuu oikea yö, a 2012 Finnish film
- Hush (2013 film), a Croatian film
- Hush (2016 feature film), an American horror/thriller film
- Hush (2016 short film), an American/horror drama film

=== TV ===
- Batman: Hush (film), a 2019 animated adaptation of a DC Comics story (see below)
- "Hush" (Buffy the Vampire Slayer), a 1999 episode of Buffy the Vampire Slayer
- Hush (TV series), a South Korean television series
- Hush, a 2022 drama series on Allblk

== Literature ==
- Hush (character), a DC Comics supervillain
  - Batman: Hush, a 2002–2003 story arc introducing the character
- Hush (novel), a 2010 novel written under the pseudonym Eishes Chayil
- Hush: An Irish Princess' Tale, a 2007 young adult novel by Donna Jo Napoli

== Music ==
- Hush!! Full Band Festival, a Chinese rock festival
- Hush Records, an American record label
- Hush (Saariaho), a 2023 trumpet concerto by Kaija Saariaho

=== Performers ===
- Hush (band), an Australian glam rock group
- Hush, a 1990s Serbian blues rock group featuring Ana Popović
- Hush (aka The Sound of Hush), a Danish pop group formed in 1997
- Hush (rapper) (born 1972), American rapper
- Hush (singer) (born 1985), Taiwanese singer

=== Albums ===
- Hush! (Ana Popović album), 2001
- Hush (Asobi Seksu album), 2009
- Hush! (Duke Pearson album) or the title song, 1962
- Hush (Jane Siberry album), 2000
- Hush (The Limousines album) or the title song, 2013
- Hush (Miss A album) or the title song, 2013
- Hush (Yo-Yo Ma and Bobby McFerrin album), 1992
- Hush (single album) or the title song, by Everglow, 2019
- The Hush, 1999 album by Texas

=== Songs ===
- "Hush" (Billy Joe Royal song), 1967; covered by Deep Purple (1968), Kula Shaker (1997), and others
- "Hush" (Emily Osment and Josh Ramsay song), 2011
- "Hush" (LL Cool J song), 2004
- "Hush" (Muse song), featuring Ellie Goulding, 2026
- "Hush" (Tool song), 1992
- "Hush", by Apink from Une Année, 2012
- "Hush", by Club 8 from Pleasure, 2015
- "Hush", by Hellyeah from Blood for Blood, 2015
- "Hush", by Koda Kumi from DNA, 2018
- "Hush", by Meghan Trainor from Toy with Me, 2026

== People ==
- Noel Hush (1924–2019), Australian chemist
- Ralph Hush (1783–1860), English convict sent to Australia
- Ramon Abbas (born 1982), Nigerian criminal, commonly known as Hush

== Villages ==
- Hush, East Azerbaijan, a village in East Azerbaijan Province, Iran
- Hush, Hamadan, a village in Hamadan Province, Iran
- Hush, Lorestan, a village in Lorestan Province, Iran

== Other uses ==
- Hush! (painting), an 1875 painting by James Tissot
- Hush (tabloid), a sensationalist tabloid newspaper published in Toronto from 1927 until 1973.
- Operation Hush, a British First World War plan
- Hush, the name of Nina’s pet goldfish in The Good Night Show and its animated spin-off Nina's World
- Hush, A boss from The Binding of Isaac: Rebirth

== See also ==
- Hushe, Pakistan, a village
- Hushe Valley, Pakistan
- Hushe River, Pakistan
- Huish (disambiguation)
