= Hush hush =

Hush hush or hush-hush may refer to:

== Music ==
- Disques Hushush, an independent record label
- Hush Hush, a 2013 album by Kentucky Knife Fight
- "Hush Hush" (Alexis Jordan song), 2011
- "Hush-Hush" (Be:First and Ateez song), 2024
- "Hush-Hush" (Jimmy Reed song), 1960
- "Hush Hush" (Meira Omar song), 2025
- "Hush Hush" (Pussycat Dolls song), 2008, and the 2009 version "Hush Hush; Hush Hush"
- "Hush Hush", a song by Avril Lavigne from her eponymous self-titled album, 2013
- "Hush Hush", a song by Pistol Annies from Annie Up, 2013

== Other uses ==
- Hush, Hush (series), young adult novels by Becca Fitzpatrick
  - Hush, Hush, the first novel of the series
- HushHush, a Philippine television drama series that debuted in 2008
- Hush Hush (TV series), an Indian television series
- Hush Hush – Only Your Love Can Save Them, a dating sim developed by Sad Panda Studios
- Hush Hush!, 2025 play by the British Mikron Theatre Company
- Hush-Hush, a nickname for the LNER Class W1 experimental high pressure steam locomotive

== See also ==
- Hush (disambiguation)
- Hush… Hush, Sweet Charlotte (disambiguation)
