= Sideline =

Sideline(s) may refer to:

- Extended side, the geometric line that contains the side of a polygon
- Sidelines, the lines that mark the outer boundaries of a sports field
- Sideline (app), a smartphone app
- Sidelines (newspaper), the student newspaper of Middle Tennessee State University
- Sideline, a side road in the concession road system of Upper and Lower Canada
- Side Line, a 1987 album by Onyanko Club
- "Sidelines", a 2022 song by Phoebe Bridgers
- Side job - an additional job in order to supplement income

== See also ==
- Sideliners, an Australian comedy sport television chat show
