= I Know the End =

2020 single by Phoebe Bridgers

Single by Phoebe Bridgers

from the album Punisher
- Released: July 29, 2020
- Genre: Chamber pop
- Length: 5:44
- Label: Dead Oceans
- Songwriters: Phoebe Bridgers; Christian Lee Hutson; Conor Oberst; Marshall Vore
- Producers: Tony Berg; Ethan Gruska; Phoebe Bridgers

Phoebe Bridgers singles chronology
"ICU" (2020)	"I Know the End" (2020)	"Savior Complex" (2020)

Music video
- "I Know the End" on YouTube

"I Know the End" is a song by American singer-songwriter Phoebe Bridgers. It was released on July 29, 2020 as the fourth single from her second studio album, Punisher (2020). The song is a "three-part suite" that talks about depression, euphoria, and the apocalypse that culminates in a cathartic scream. It has been described as chamber pop, though Bridgers describes it as a "big metal song". Several of Bridgers' frequent collaborators are featured on the song, including Boygenius bandmates Lucy Dacus and Julien Baker, Better Oblivion Community Center bandmate Conor Oberst, and Copycat Killer producer Rob Moose. The lead guitar part at the song’s conclusion was performed by Yeah Yeah Yeahs guitarist Nick Zinner.

== Music video ==
The song's Alissa Torvinen-directed official music video was released on July 29, 2020. It features Bridgers "as she navigates dark corridors, emerges from a tub of water, and discovers a locker room full of skeleton onesies." This leads to "an epic finale" at the empty Los Angeles Memorial Coliseum, where she has a screaming match with an older woman, whom she kisses. The abstract style recalls Wes Anderson and David Lynch as Bridgers' grapples with her own mental health.

== Live performances ==
The song made its live debut on September 10, 2020, with a virtual performance on NPR Tiny Desk, where Bridgers performed in a fake Oval Office set. Later in the month she performed the song on CBS This Morning and Late Night with Seth Meyers. The latter performance was filmed as one continuous shot in an empty theater in Covina, California. She performed the song as her Saturday Night Live on February 6, 2021, a performance she ended by smashing her guitar on a prop stage monitor.

== Critical reception ==
"I Know the End" received acclaim from music commentators, with many highlighting the song's emotional resonance and themes. It was referred to as the best song of the year by Vulture, with the website saying "The final seconds of "I Know the End" are spent on Bridgers a capella, gasping for more air to scream with—only to choke on it. Frankly, I can't think of a better metaphor for 2020." A review for Pitchfork said that it "packs an album's worth of ideas into five minutes and 45 seconds. One moment the Punisher closer is a hushed acoustic ballad, the next it's a swelling mid-tempo strummer, and then it explodes into an orchestral fanfare, and each section has its own emotional arc". A review for NME called it "an epic cacophony; musing on the apocalypse while boasting the singer’s delicate, calm and reflective side before blossoming into the biggest thing she's ever done". A Consequence of Sound review read "The ominous ballad returns to the singer-songwriter's narrative abilities and chronicles a bleak look at the world in step with references to American culture and recent happenings through orchestrated folk hymns and electric guitar." On October 27, 2026, it was listed as the #6 best rock song of the 21st century so far by Rolling Stone Magazine.

=== Year-end lists ===
"I Know the End" on year-end lists
Publication	List	Rank	Ref.
Consequence of Sound	Top 50 Best Songs of 2020	2	
The Fader	The 100 best songs of 2020	39	
NME	The 50 best songs of 2020	9	
NPR	Best Music of 2020	17	
Pitchfork	The 100 Best Songs of 2020	39	
The Ringer	The Best Songs of 2020	2	
Spin	The 30 Best Songs of 2020	19	
Uproxx	Top Best Songs of 2020	6	
Vulture	The Best Songs of 2020	1	

== Personnel ==
- Julien Baker – vocals
- Phoebe Bridgers – lead vocals, baritone electric guitar
- Lucy Dacus – vocals
- Lukas Frank – vocals
- Ethan Gruska – sound design, synthesizers, Mellotron, Optigan flutes
- Christian Lee Hutson – vocals
- Jenny Lee Lindberg – bass
- Malcolm McRae – vocals
- Rob Moose – strings
- Conor Oberst – vocals
- Emily Retsas – bass
- Kane Ritchotte – vocals
- Tomberlin – vocals
- Marshall Vore – drums, percussion, vocals
- Jeroen Vrijhoef – vocals
- Nathaniel Walcott – horns
- Nick White – piano, Mellotron
- Nick Zinner – electric guitar

== Certifications ==
Certifications for "I Know the End"
Region	Certification	Certified units/sales
New Zealand (RMNZ)	Gold	15,000^{‡}
United Kingdom (BPI)	Silver	200,000^{‡}
^{‡} Sales+streaming figures based on certification alone.
