= Kentucky Knife Fight =

American rock band

- Origin: St. Louis, Missouri, U.S.
- Genres: Blues, alternative rock, punk blues
- Years active: 2005–2014
- Labels: Independent, Throwing Things (vinyl)
- Past members: Jason Holler; Curtis J Brewer; Nate Jones; Jason Koenig; James Baker; Nathan Jatcko; David Wiatrolik; Dad
- Website: kentuckyknifefight.net

Kentucky Knife Fight was an American rock band from St. Louis, Missouri. Active since 2005, the band had been a congruent force alongside Pokey LaFarge, So Many Dynamos and Sleepy Kitty in bringing national attention to a re-emerging St. Louis music scene. Their sound is generally classified as "noir blues", combining pre-rock elements of blues, dark-bluegrass and jazz with punk, pop, and twang influences.

== History ==
Kentucky Knife Fight was formed by original members Jason Holler, Nate Jones, Jason "Mr. Cool" Koenig, and "Handsome" James Baker during their time at Southern Illinois University Edwardsville. Holler and Koenig met as high school classmates in Quincy, Illinois and reunited in 2005 while both attending SIUE. While at a small concert together at the historic Stagger Inn in Edwardsville, the two watched the Southern Illinois dark-bluegrass band the Woodbox Gang. After the concert, Holler and Koenig decided to start a band that would infuse Americana roots, dark narrative themes, and the garage and proto-punk influences which were undergoing a revival at the time. Employing James Baker on drums and Nate Jones on guitar, the 4-piece began holding songwriting sessions to write original material. On April 22, 2005, using small practice amps and borrowed PA gear, the unnamed 4-piece group performed two original songs at an open mic night held at the Stagger Inn. Later in 2005, the group added David Wiatrolik, a classmate of Koenig's in the SIUE music department, to the band as a second guitar and banjo player.

In January 2010, David Wiatrolik announced he would be leaving the band. After a final performance at Edwardsville's Stagger Inn on May 6, 2010, Curtis J Brewer became the newest member, taking over as the band's second guitarist and banjo player.

In February 2010, Jason Koenig contacted Brewer about filling in for an April 22 show opening for the Legendary Shack Shakers that the band had committed to before learning of Wiatrolik's exiting plan. Brewer, a musician and educator in the St. Louis area, agreed to play the show. At the first rehearsal with Brewer, the group was impressed enough with Brewer learning all of their songs, asked if he was interested in playing in Kentucky Knife Fight full-time. The first performance with Brewer on guitar and banjo was April 17, 2010, at Vintage Vinyl for Record Store Day. Their first official show with the current lineup was on April 22, 2010 opening for the Legendary Shack Shakers at the Firebird (St. Louis).

Filming for their first official music video (for the song "Love the Lonely") began in February 2011. The videos theme and concept was created by Holler and directed by Ryan Frank of St. Louis' First Punch Film Productions. St. Louis Magazine, while interviewing Holler in 2013, wrote that "...The result, Holler feels, captured the 'dark, noirish, and moody' feel the group wanted, with Holler cast as a cabdriver, ferrying various St. Louis characters through a loving (or lovelorn) night. The song was subsequently used for the entire opening-credit sequence of the film 23 Minutes to Sunrise, directed by St. Louisan Jay Kanzler and starring Eric Roberts."

On August 4, 2012, Kentucky Knife Fight performed in St. Louis for the release of the "Misshapen Love" / "Love the Lonely" vinyl 7" single (released on the St. Louis-based label Throwing Things Records).

On March 2, 2013, Kentucky Knife Fight released their full-length album Hush Hush to a sold-out crowd at the famed St. Louis concert venue, Off Broadway. The concert was filmed in its entirety and released for free online streaming.

The band toured relentlessly after the release of Hush Hush, but announced plans in September 2014 to end the band. Kentucky Knife Fight gave their last performance in front of a sold-out crowd on Saturday, November 22, 2014 at the St. Louis venue Off Broadway.

== Members ==
- Jason Holler – vocals, harmonica (2005–2014)
- Curtis J Brewer – guitar, banjo, vocals (2010–2014)
- Nate Jones – guitar, vocals (2005–2014)
- Jason "Mr. Cool" Koenig – bass, vocals (2005–2014)
- James Baker – drums, percussion (2005–2014)
- Nathan Jatcko – keyboards, organ (2012–2014)
- David Wiatrolik – guitar, banjo, vocals (2006–2010)

== Awards ==
| Year | Award | Publication/society | Author/info |
|---|---|---|---|
| 2009 | Best Album (The Wolf Crept, the Children Slept) | Riverfront Times Music Awards | Zaleski, Annie (June 17, 2009). "The 2009 RFT Music Awards Winners". Riverfront Times. St.Louis, MO. |
| 2011 | Best Rock Band | Riverfront Times Music Awards | Cox, Calvin (June 23, 2011). "2011 RFT Music Awards Winners: Best Rock Band: Kentucky Knife Fight". Riverfront Times. St.Louis, MO. |
| 2012 | Best Rock Band | Riverfront Times Music Awards | Maletsky, Kiernan (June 7, 2012). "2012 RFT Music Award Winners". Riverfront Times. St.Louis, MO. |
| 2013 | Best Rock Band | Riverfront Times Music Awards | "The 2013 RFT Music Award Winners". Riverfront Times. RFT Music. June 5, 2013. |
| 2013 | Best Band Name (Reader's Choice) | Riverfront Times "Best of" Awards | "Best of St. Louis 2013 - Best Band Name". Riverfront Times. RFT Arts & Entertainment. May 1, 2013. |
| 2013 | Best Album (Hush Hush) | Dallas Music Enthusiast "Best of" Awards | Buford, Jordan (December 29, 2013). "The Best of 2013". The Music Enthusiast. Dallas, TX. |
| 2014 | Best Rock Band | Riverfront Times Music Awards | Hill, Daniel (June 11, 2014). "2014 RFT Music Awards Winners". Riverfront Times. St.Louis, MO. Archived from the original on December 13, 2017. |
| 2014 | Best Local Band | St. Louis Post-Dispatch GO! List 2014 | Johnson, Kevin (July 26, 2014). "The Go! List - Best Local Band". St. Louis Post-Dispatch. St.Louis, MO. |

== Appearances ==
- Alongside indie-rock cohorts the Blind Eyes, Kentucky Knife Fight performed for the 2010, 2011, & 2012 New Year's Eve blowout event at famed St. Louis venue Off Broadway. The sold-out shows featured original sets from both bands and a super-group (dubbed Dino's House Band) set of cover songs performed throughout the night.
- Kentucky Knife Fight performed for the SXSW 2011 & 2012 day parties for 88.1 KDHX at Jovita's in Austin, TX, alongside acts such as Nikka Costa, Joe Pug, JC & the Uptown Sound and Nikki Lane.
- In 2011, 2012, and 2013, Kentucky Knife Fight was selected as featured act for the MidPoint Music Festival in Cincinnati, OH.
- The group performed in November 2012 as direct support for Rev. Horton Heat at Springfield, IL's 900 capacity concert venue, Donnie's Homespun.
- Their song "Love the Lonely" was licensed for the opening credits of the full-length motion picture 23 Minutes to Sunrise.
- In August, 2013, Kentucky Knife Fight performed as direct support for Lucero for a sold-out crowd on day 2 of the Open Highway Festival (St. Louis, MO)
- Kentucky Knife Fight was selected as one of three St. Louis bands to perform for the 2013 Loufest Music Festival held in Forest Park on September 7 & 8, 2013 (St. Louis, MO). The festival featured acts such as Wilco, the Killers, the National, the Alabama Shakes, Jim James, and more.
- Bloomington, IN musical group Murder by Death hosted Kentucky Knife Fight as direct support on a Mid-West tour in September 2013.
- Dallax, Tx musical group Old 97's hosted Kentucky Knife Fight as direct support on a North US tour in June 2014.
- Kentucky Knife Fight performed their farewell show on November 22, 2014 at the St. Louis venue Off Broadway. The sold-out show also featured original sets from support acts (and long-time touring contemporaries) Whiskey Folk Ramblers and Christian Lee Hutson.

== Discography ==
=== Albums ===
The Wolf Crept, the Children Slept (2008)
Recorded by Brian Scheffer & Nelson Jones at Firebrand Studios (St. Louis, MO) in 2008.
Mixed by Brian Scheffer at Firebrand Studios
Mastered by Carl Saff at Saff Mastering (Chicago, IL)

- Released: 2008
- Format: Compact disc, digital
- Writer: Kentucky Knife Fight
- Producer: Kentucky Knife Fight, Brian Scheffer
- Tracks: "Rancid Smelling Aphrodisiac", "Little Sister", "Sex Crimes", "West 19", "Wild Irish Rose", "Hershel Walker", "I Don't Mind (intro)", "I Don't Mind"
  "South Roxana Wiggle", "17", "Gone Away", "Got My Heaven", "Crooked Waltz", "Outro With the Flying Nun"
- Singles: "Hershel Walker"

We're All Nameless Here (2010)
Recorded by Brian Scheffer & Nelson Jones at Firebrand Studios (St. Louis, MO) in 2010.
Mixed by Brian Scheffer, Curtis J Brewer & Kentucky Knife Fight at Firebrand Studios
Mastered by Carl Saff at Saff Mastering (Chicago, IL)

- Released: July 24, 2010
- Format: Compact disc, digital
- Writer: Kentucky Knife Fight
- Producer: Kentucky Knife Fight, Brian Scheffer
- Tracks: "No Fault of My Own", "I Can't Stand This", "Dream So Sweet", "Nameless", "Same Streets, Same Clothes", "6 Months Along"
  "Strange Bedfellows", "Own Damn Good", "Always a Bribe, Never a Bride", "Expectations (The Living Man)", "Snake in the Grass (2005"
- Singles: "Nameless", "Always a Bribe, Never a Bride"

Hush Hush (2013)
Recorded by David Beeman & David Vandervelde at Native Sound (St. Louis, MO) in 2012.
Mixed by Kit Hamon at Native Sound studio B
Mastered by Carl Saff at Saff Mastering (Chicago, IL)

- Released: March 2, 2013
- Format: Compact disc, digital
- Writer: Kentucky Knife Fight
- Producer: Kentucky Knife Fight, David Beeman, David Vandervelde
- Tracks: "Paper Flowers Three", "Bad Blood", "Misshapen Love", "Paper Flowers Two", "Theme for No One"
  "Love the Lonely", "Hush Hush", "Gunsmoke", "Father", "Paper Flowers One"
- Bonus tracks: Bandcamp Exclusive: "Paper Flowers Three" (Bonus mix), "Bad Blood" (Alternate mix by Studio CTS), "Love the Lonely" (Electropolis remix)
- Singles: "Misshapen Love", "Love the Lonely", "Bad Blood"

=== Singles ===
- "Misshapen Love / Love the Lonely" (2012), Throwing Things Records

=== Compilation appearances ===
- "My Brave Daughter" - Last in the American League: a 2014 time-capsule of St. Louis Music & Art (2014)
