= Punisher (album) =

Studio album by Phoebe Bridgers
- Released: June 18, 2020
- Recorded: 2018–2019
- Studios: Sound City (Van Nuys, California)
- Genres: Indie rock; emo-folk; indie folk
- Length: 40:37
- Label: Dead Oceans
- Producers: Tony Berg; Ethan Gruska; Phoebe Bridgers

Phoebe Bridgers chronology
Better Oblivion Community Center (2019)	Punisher (2020)	Copycat Killer (2020)

Singles from Punisher
- 1. "Garden Song" Released: February 26, 2020; 2. "Kyoto" Released: April 9, 2020; 3. "ICU" Released: May 19, 2020; 4. "I Know the End" Released: July 29, 2020; 5. "Savior Complex" Released: December 1, 2020

Punisher is the second studio album by American singer-songwriter Phoebe Bridgers, released on June 18, 2020, by Dead Oceans. It is the follow-up to her 2017 debut album, Stranger in the Alps.

Punisher was recorded over a year and a half period at Sound City Studios in Los Angeles and reunited Bridgers with producers Tony Berg and Ethan Gruska, who also engineered Stranger. Its recording process was collaborative, with its liner notes crediting multiple musicians, including Julien Baker, Lucy Dacus, Christian Lee Hutson, Jim Keltner, Blake Mills, and Conor Oberst. Bridgers drew inspiration from the work of Joan Didion, the podcast My Favorite Murder, and the novel The Last Policeman, as well as the death of her dog Max. The title track is an homage to Elliott Smith and reflects on Bridgers's fandom of his work.

Punisher is an indie rock, emo-folk, and indie folk album, featuring elements of indie pop and bluegrass on individual songs. Bridgers released five singles – "Garden Song", "Kyoto", "ICU", "I Know the End" and "Savior Complex" – in support of the album. In November 2020, she released Copycat Killer, which features four orchestral remixes of the songs from Punisher, arranged by Rob Moose. Punisher peaked at number 43 on the Billboard 200 chart and appeared on the national charts for the United Kingdom, Ireland, Belgium, the Netherlands, Germany, New Zealand, Australia, Canada, and Switzerland. Bridgers supported the album with the headlining Reunion Tour from 2021 to 2023.

Upon its release, the album attracted acclaim from music critics, who celebrated the vulnerability, specificity, and humor of its lyrics. Punisher was ranked highly in best-of-the-year lists released by Pitchfork, Consequence of Sound, The New Yorker, Under the Radar, and NPR, among others. It was nominated for the Grammy Award for Best Alternative Music Album.

== Background ==
American singer-songwriter Phoebe Bridgers rose to prominence in indie rock in the late 2010s with a blend of subdued and specific songwriting. In 2017, she released her debut album, Stranger in the Alps, on the independent label Dead Oceans. The LP received widespread acclaim from critics. John Mayer commented that the single "Funeral" heralded "the arrival of a giant."

In the wake of her first album, Bridgers performed on songs with Matt Berninger of the National, Fiona Apple, the 1975, and Jackson Browne. In 2018, she co-founded the supergroup Boygenius with musicians Julien Baker and Lucy Dacus in the lead-up to a joint tour. She also formed Better Oblivion Community Center with Conor Oberst—a friend who had previously appeared on Stranger—releasing their first album in January 2019. She also worked closely with singer-songwriter Christian Lee Hutson, producing his album, Beginners. Ryan Leas, writing for Stereogum, observed that Bridgers's growing body of work—particularly before releasing a second album—was already "diverse and complex".

== Writing and production ==
Bridgers first began developing Punisher while on the road touring, with multiple songs written during the Stranger in the Alps roll-out. After producing Strangers with Bridgers, Ethan Gruska and Tony Berg also produced Punisher. She described the process as collaborative, with Bridgers drawing inspiration from friends and collaborators during the process, including Berg, Gruska, her Boygenius band-mates, and Oberst. Bridgers also identified drummer Marshall Vore, whom she had previously dated, as her "go-to guy" while brainstorming song lyrics. Bridgers reworked lyrics frequently, occasionally preserving facetious lyrics originally intended as placeholders.

While working on Punisher, the essays of notable Californian Joan Didion provided inspiration to Bridgers, a lifelong Southern Californian. She also read and drew from the novel The Last Policeman, which follows a detective determined to solve a murder as the world ends. The podcast My Favorite Murder and her general interest in true crime similarly influenced the album. Bridgers's dog Max died during the recording process, which she said tinged the work with "just a dark, more adult take on life."

Elliott Smith, who she has described as one of her heroes, provides the basis for the title track, where Bridgers imagines him placating her as a too-eager superfan, known as a punisher. Bridgers thought she might self-title the album, but settled on Punisher as a self-descriptor that sounded cool. As she put it to Stereogum:

I have an opposite response to it now, but I definitely, for most of my life, was a punisher. [...] I would come up to people and ask for a picture. I hung out at the bottom of the stairs for James Blake at the Troubadour where there is no other exit. I was like, "He's trapped, but he'll be glad to talk to me." And now it's happened to me.

Bridgers recorded the album sporadically from mid-2018 through late 2019. It was primarily recorded at Sound City in Van Nuys, California, where producer Tony Berg worked. Session drummer Jim Keltner performs twice on the album and musician Blake Mills—then a Sound City artist-in-residence—plays on three songs. The album came together in a sequential order; many songs were recorded in the order they appear on the album. For the title track, Gruska utilized samples of birds, a Mellotron and a back-masked clip of Bridgers's voice that fade in and out at various points in the song. Bridgers referred to the technique as "riding the faders", which she learned from engineer Joseph Lorge. Bridgers also continued her practice of double tracking all of her vocals as a tribute to Smith. In a review, music critic Lindsay Zoladz wrote that the album mixes Bridgers's "arpeggiated guitar work" with "looping synths and eerily groaning strings."

=== Themes ===
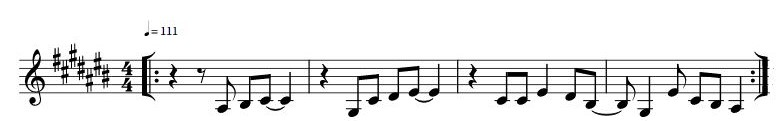
The repeating refrain from the conclusion of "I Know the End"

Punisher has been described as an indie rock, emo-folk, and indie folk album. Lyrically, it tackles themes of "missed connections, the tension between the inner and outer self, [and] the lonely ache of watching things end." Quinn Moreland of Pitchfork interpreted the LP as born from "languid spells of depression, desire, and self-destruction".

Bridgers's songwriting ranges from sardonic to sharply honest; Zoladz observed that Bridgers "weav[es] tiny, specific, time-stamped details (chemtrails, Saltines, serotonin) into durable big-tent tapestries of feeling." Altogether, the album chronicles Bridgers's personal journey towards therapy and being able to better enjoy life. While Stranger is rooted in trauma, Punisher identifies tools she used to deal with that trauma.

== Songs ==
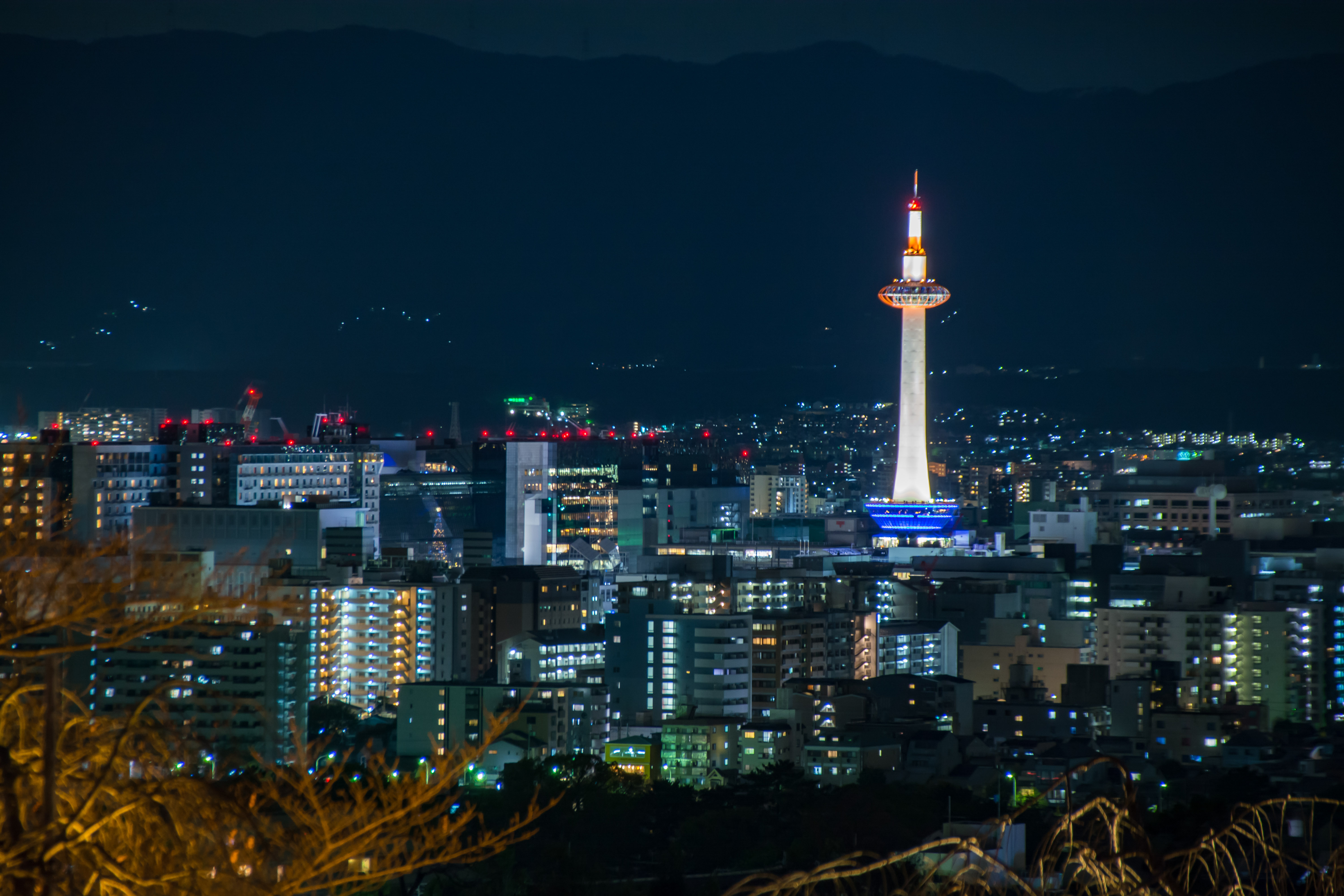
"Kyoto" recounts Bridgers's experience with dissociation during a trip to the Japanese city

=== Tracks 1–4 ===
The instrumental "DVD Menu" opens the LP and segues into "Garden Song", the album's lead single. "Garden Song" centers on self-manifestation and how one's actions can push things into motion. Bridgers drew a parallel to "Smoke Signals", the lead single from Stranger in the Alps, with both tracks being love songs, albeit from different perspectives. The song imagines a haunted garden, where Bridgers implies she has hidden the body of a skinhead neighbor. Amanda Petrusich described the synthesizer-based production as "lush and wet." "Kyoto" stemmed from her complex relationship with her father, for whom she had "so much fucking empathy and so much fucking anger". The narrative also follows Bridgers on a trip to Japan, exploring a theme of dissociation she felt applied to most other songs on the album. "Kyoto" has been described as one of the catchier songs on the album; its upbeat tone was suggested by Berg and Gruska, who felt the album had too many slow ballads. After it had moved away from the ballad format, Bridgers suggested incorporating trumpets, in the style of Sufjan Stevens or the Smiths. The title track imagines Bridgers as a punisher—an overbearing superfan—for her musical hero Elliott Smith. The song indirectly references Smith's Either/Or and other aspects of his life and work.

=== Tracks 5–8 ===
"Halloween" centers on a decaying relationship that is being clung to until the holidays. The song's development took over a year and a half, with Bridgers struggling with a verse. Conor Oberst, who sings in the song's second half, suggested she write about a topic she brought up frequently: the murder of a Giants fan by a group of Dodger fans at Dodger Stadium amidst the Dodgers–Giants rivalry. The sixth track, "Chinese Satellite", features an upbeat strings-based melody. The lyrics focus on her internal conflict over belief in the supernatural and cynicism, typified by the couplet "Took a tour to see the stars but they weren’t out tonight/So I wished hard on a Chinese satellite". "Moon Song" romanticizes a lover who hates themselves. Ryan Leas of Stereogum singled out the couplet "We hate 'Tears in Heaven'/But it's sad that his baby died" as particularly memorable; these lines refer to guitarist Eric Clapton's account of his son's tragic death. She wrote the melody to follow-up song "Savior Complex", a folk rock and indie pop waltz, in a dream. The song carries on the subject of a difficult relationship. Its music video was directed in black and white by Phoebe Waller-Bridge and featured her then-boyfriend Paul Mescal.

=== Tracks 9–11 ===
"ICU" (Note: Bridgers briefly re-titled the song "I See You" upon its debut, due to the unwanted connection to ICU wards during the COVID-19 pandemic.)—as in intensive care unit—has been called a "devastating breakup song" and recounts Bridgers's breakup with collaborator Marshall Vore, who remained her touring drummer and confidant. Bridgers penned the bluegrass-inspired song "Graceland Too" on a trip to Nashville to visit her bandmates in Boygenius, who later added vocals to the song. The title references an abandoned shrine to Elvis Presley. The song follows the narrator meeting with her friend who had struggled with serious mental distress, culminating in a moment of serenity—"So we spent what was left of our serotonin/To chew on our cheeks and stare at the moon"—and a three-part harmony where she expresses her devotion to the friend. Lindsay Zoladz wrote that the specificity of "Graceland Too" demonstrated Bridgers's lyrical skills, while Pitchfork reviewer Sam Sodomsky called it "one of her greatest songs yet." "I Know the End" starts as a folk song, before shifting to an "apocalyptic road song". It went through several different iterations and was both the first song to be developed and the last to see completion. Bridgers and Vore first developed the song as a depiction of tour-related depression. Bridgers sings of passing a highway billboard that reads "the end is near". A chorus of guest vocalists join in and coalesce in a cacophony of screams.

== Release ==
Punisher was highly anticipated. The album's first single, "Garden Song", was released on February 26, 2020, with its follow-up, "Kyoto", seeing release on April 9 of that year. The album's third single "ICU" (retitled "I See You") was released on May 19, 2020. After the album, Bridgers released two more songs as singles: "I Know the End" on July 29 and "Savior Complex" on December 1.

The LP was scheduled for release on June 19—or Juneteenth, a holiday celebrating the end of slavery in the U.S.—but Bridgers opted to release it early on digital services on June 18, with an announcement encouraging fans to donate to organizations seeking racial justice. It debuted during the COVID-19 pandemic, and amid a period of civil unrest in the U.S., with citizens protesting the murder by police of George Floyd and other people of color. "I'm not [delaying] the record until things go back to 'normal' because I don't think they should," Bridgers wrote on Twitter. Touring plans for Punisher were postponed due to the pandemic. Bridgers was scheduled to open for the 1975 on a stadium tour. Bridgers announced a headlining tour which ran from August 2021 to early 2023.

=== Skeleton suit ===
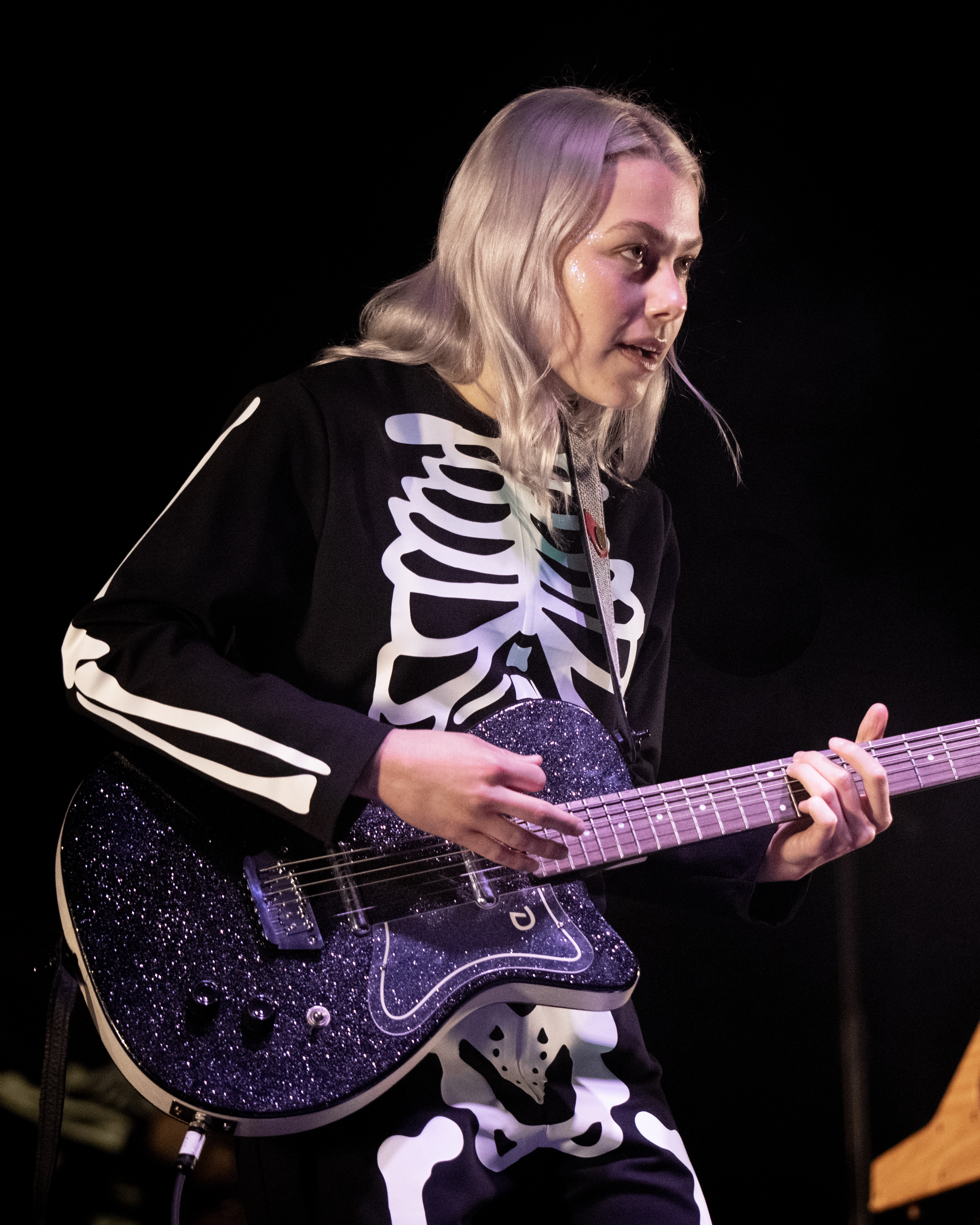
Bridgers in skeleton one-piece, pictured October 2021 in Minneapolis

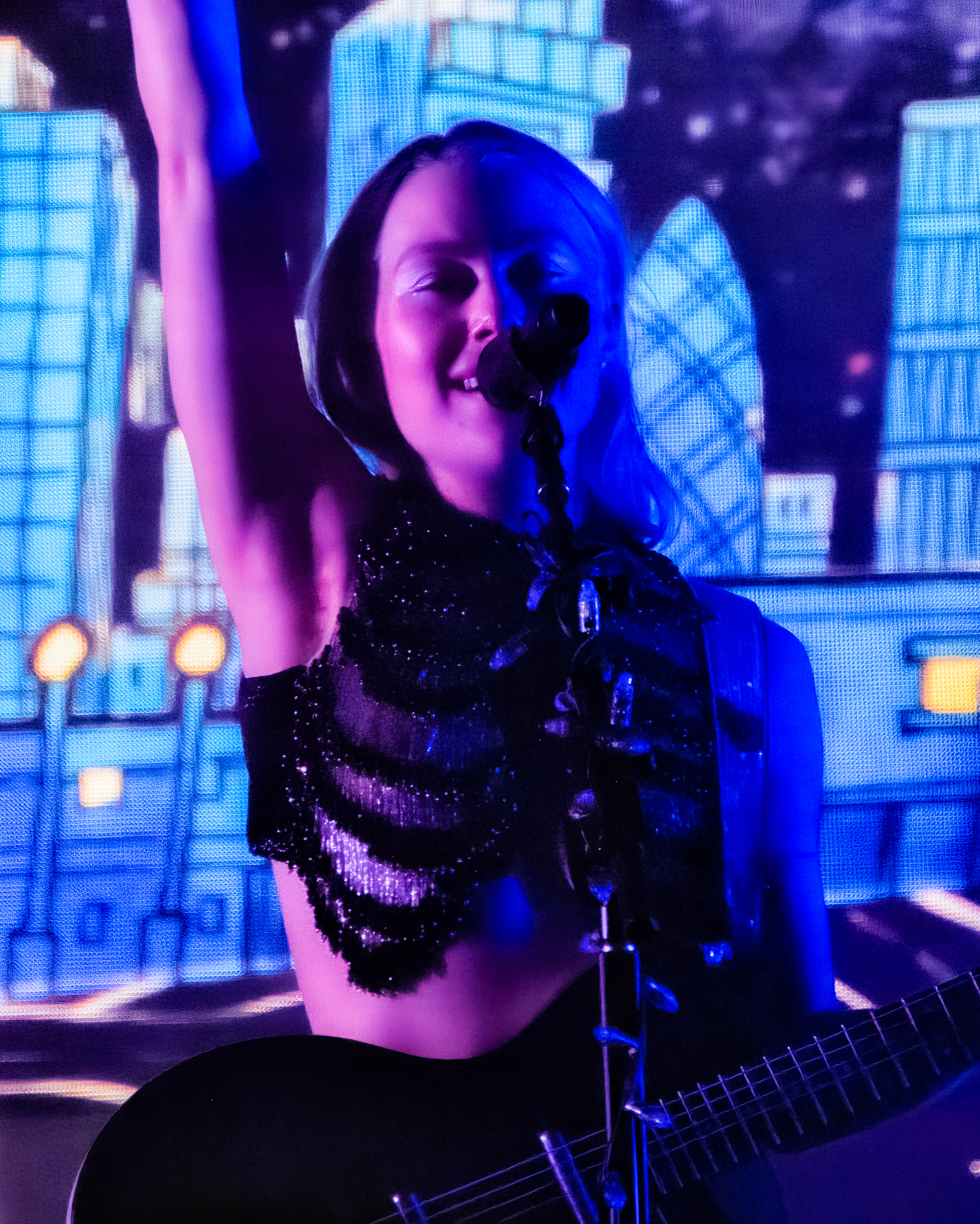
Bridgers in skeleton inspired waistcoat, pictured August 2022 in Redmond, Washington

Following the use of a ghost as a visual motif for Stranger in the Alps, Bridgers chose to use a skeleton suit throughout the release of Punisher. She wore the skeleton suit for performances on The Late Show with Stephen Colbert, The Late Late Show with James Corden, and three of the four music videos for the album. Bridgers said she was inspired by a 2018 beaded dress that Thom Browne had designed, which she herself wore to the 2021 Grammy Awards. In June 2020, she described the impetus:

I put on the skeleton suit, and it’s like, "Damn, this is comfortable." So I think being a character is funny but it also [. . .] is rooted in reality. Like I really have been wearing the same pajamas for like two months.

As the tour continued, Bridgers wore different versions of the skeleton costume. At a 2021 performance at the Governors Ball Music Festival, she wore a waistcoat based on a ribcage, which was designed by Gucci. She wore the same Gucci version during her performance on Saturday Night Live. At the 2023 Met Gala, Tory Burch designed a dress that was "an abstract take" on the skeleton motif, using ivory pearls on black mesh with duchesse satin.

=== Album artwork ===
The photograph for the cover of the record was of Bridgers at the Trona Pinnacles, taken by Swedish photographer Olof Grind. Though the album artwork shoot was originally planned for a location in England, Grind preferred the look of the California desert. After suggesting the location, Bridgers and Grind, along with mutual friend Emily Bannon, traveled to different locations in the region in an all-day road trip. Using a red-light filter staged at the Pinnacles in a late-night shoot, the concept posed Bridgers in a skeleton costume "standing completely still waiting to be beamed up by aliens." Originally, the photo featured Bridgers in a white dress, but they returned to the site to retake the photo with Bridgers wearing the skeleton suit.

In 2024, Rolling Stone listed the photo as the 96th best album cover of all time, writing that it "represents everything we were feeling at the time: fear, loneliness, heartbreak, and the secret wish for extraterrestrials to scoop you up into the sky and get you the hell out of here."

=== Copycat Killer ===
Bridgers released Copycat Killer on November 20, 2020. The EP features orchestral versions of four songs from Punisher, produced by Rob Moose. Sale for the accompanying vinyl was limited at 1500 copies in Rough Trade record stores. Copycat Killer reached a peak position of 78 on the Billboard 200 in May 2021. The title comes from a lyric in the title track where she describes herself as a "copycat killer with a chemical cut", equating her inspiration from and mimicking of Elliott Smith with the behavior of a copycat serial killer.

== Critical reception ==
Professional ratings
Aggregate scores
Source	Rating
AnyDecentMusic?	8.4/10
Metacritic	90/100
Review scores
Source	Rating
AllMusic	5/5 stars
The A.V. Club	A−
Consequence of Sound	A−
The Daily Telegraph	5/5 stars
The Independent	4/5 stars
The Line of Best Fit	8/10
NME	5/5 stars
Pitchfork	8.7/10
Rolling Stone	4/5 stars
Slant Magazine	4/5 stars

Punisher received widespread acclaim from music critics. The album has a score of 90 out of 100 on Metacritic, indicating "universal acclaim", based on 31 reviews. The music-review aggregator AnyDecentMusic? gave the album a rating of 8.4/10.

Pitchfork's Sam Sodomsky designated it with the publication's "Best New Music" tag, calling it "candid, multi-dimensional, slyly psychedelic, and full of heart." Jonathan Bernstein from Rolling Stone praised the album's "eleven expertly rendered, largely downcast songs about broken faith, desperate, occasionally self-destructive love, and tenuous recovery." NME gave the album a perfect score.

David Sackllah of Consequence of Sound gave the album an A−, writing that "Punisher beams with a restless energy and twisted dream logic that erupts into striking moments of clarity in a way reminiscent of the National's Boxer." For AllMusic, Fred Thomas called the songwriting "masterful" and wrote that Punisher reflected Bridgers's willingness to explore the dark parts of her psyche. Alexandra Pollard from The Independent noted that the album reflected Bridgers's growth as an artist. New York Times contributor Lindsay Zoladz designated it as a critic's pick.

Robert Christgau was less enthusiastic. He highlighted the songs "ICU" and "Graceland Too", but otherwise dismissed the album as too focused on "articulated depression".

== Accolades ==
=== Year-end lists ===
Critics' rankings for Punisher
Publication	Accolade	Rank	Ref.
The A.V. Club	The 20 Best Albums of 2020	2	
Billboard	The 50 Best Albums of 2020	15	
Consequence of Sound	The 50 Best Albums of 2020	3	
Esquire	The 50 Best Albums of 2020	1	
The Fader	The 50 Best Albums of 2020	5	
The Guardian	The 50 Best Albums of 2020	16	
GQ (UK)	Best Albums of 2020	2	
The New Yorker	The Best Music of 2020	10	
The New York Times	Lindsay Zoladz's Best Albums of 2020	2	
NME	The 50 Best Albums of 2020	5	
NPR	The 50 Best Albums of 2020	4	
Paste	The 50 Best Albums of 2020	14	
Pitchfork	The 50 Best Albums of 2020	4	
PopSugar	The 50 Best Albums of 2020	14	
Rolling Stone	The 50 Best Albums of 2020	10	
Slate	The Best Albums of 2020	1	
Spin	The 30 Best Albums of 2020	7	
Stereogum	The Top 50 Best Albums of 2020	28	
Under the Radar	Top 100 Albums of 2020	1	
Uproxx	The Best Albums of 2020	2	
Us Weekly	10 Best Albums of 2020	7	
USA Today	The 10 Best Albums of 2020	8	
Variety	Chris Willman's Albums of 2020	7	
Variety	Jem Aswad's Albums of 2020	6	
Vulture	The Best Albums of 2020	5	

=== Awards ===
Awards and nominations for Punisher
Year	Ceremony	Category	Nominated Work	Result	Ref.
2021	Grammy Awards	Best Alternative Music Album	Punisher	Nominated	
2021	Grammy Awards	Best Rock Performance	"Kyoto"	Nominated	
2021	Grammy Awards	Best Rock Song	"Kyoto"	Nominated	

== Track listing ==
No.	Title	Writer(s)	Length
1.	"DVD Menu"	Phoebe Bridgers	1:09
2.	"Garden Song"	Bridgers; Christian Lee Hutson; Marshall Vore	3:39
3.	"Kyoto"	Bridgers; Morgan Nagler; Vore	3:04
4.	"Punisher"	Bridgers; Conor Oberst; Vore	3:09
5.	"Halloween"	Bridgers; Hutson; Oberst	4:31
6.	"Chinese Satellite"	Bridgers; Oberst; Vore	3:37
7.	"Moon Song"	Bridgers	4:37
8.	"Savior Complex"	Bridgers; Hutson; Oberst	4:01
9.	"ICU"	Bridgers; Vore; Nicholas White	3:10
10.	"Graceland Too"	Bridgers; Hutson	3:56
11.	"I Know the End"	Bridgers; Hutson; Oberst; Vore	5:44
Total length:			40:37

== Personnel ==
Credits are adapted from the album's liner notes.

Musicians

- Julien Baker – vocals (10, 11)
- Tony Berg – electric guitar (3, 6, 8, 9), autoharp (3), Syndrum (4), Mellotron (7), bandura (7), banjo (10)
- Phoebe Bridgers – lead vocals, baritone electric guitar (1, 3, 6, 11), "rubber Bridgers" guitar (3, 9), electric guitar (3, 9), fader performance (4), nylon guitar (7), hi strung guitar (8, 10)
- Anna Butterss – bass (9)
- Lucy Dacus – vocals (10, 11)
- Lukas Frank – vocals (11)
- Ethan Gruska – sound design (1, 5–8, 11), programming (2), synthesizers (2, 3, 5, 11), electric guitar (3), acoustic guitar (9), Mellotron (3, 9, 11), piano (4, 5, 7), Pocket Piano (7), vocoder (4), fader performance (4), tenor bass (4), sub-bass (4), bass (6, 7), Optigan flutes (5, 11), sampling (9), pump organ (10)
- Christian Lee Hutson – 12-string guitar (2), baritone electric guitar (5), acoustic guitar (8), celeste (8), vocals (11)
- Jim Keltner – drums (5, 8)
- Jenny Lee Lindberg – bass (3, 9, 11)
- Joseph Lorge – electric guitar (3)
- Malcolm McRae – vocals (11)
- Blake Mills – baritone electric guitar (5), slat drum (5), clarinet (8)
- Rob Moose – strings (1, 4, 6, 8, 11), string arrangement
- Conor Oberst – vocals (5, 11)
- Emily Retsas – bass (11)
- Kane Ritchotte – vocals (11)
- Sebastian Steinberg – upright bass (5, 8), bowed bass (10)
- Tomberlin – vocals (11)
- Marshall Vore – drums (3, 6, 7, 9, 11), percussion (3, 4, 6, 9, 11), vocals (9, 11)
- Jeroen Vrijhoef – vocals (2, 11)
- Nathaniel Walcott – horns (3, 11), horn arrangement
- Sara Watkins – fiddle (10)
- Nick White – piano (11), Mellotron (11)
- Harrison Whitford – electric guitar (3, 6, 7, 9), 12-string acoustic guitar (3), 12-string electric guitar (3), hi strung acoustic guitar (3), acoustic guitar (10)
- Nick Zinner – electric guitar (11)

Engineers

- Will Maclellan – engineering
- Joseph Lorge – engineering
- Mike Mogis – mixing
- Bob Ludwig – mastering

Artwork

- Olof Grind – photography
- Chris Riddell – booklet illustrations
- Travis DeMello – booklet layout and design
- Nathaniel David Utesch – layout, design

== Charts ==
=== Weekly charts ===
Weekly chart performance for Punisher
Chart (2020)	Peak position
Australian Albums (ARIA)	12
Belgian Albums (Ultratop Flanders)	20
Canadian Albums (Billboard)	96
Dutch Albums (Album Top 100)	43
German Albums (Offizielle Top 100)	39
Irish Albums (Official Charts)	18
New Zealand Albums (RMNZ)	10
Scottish Albums (Official Charts)	3
Sweden Vinyl (Sverigetopplistan)	3
Swiss Albums (Schweizer Hitparade)	37
UK Albums (Official Charts)	6
UK Americana Albums (Official Charts)	3
UK Independent Albums (OCC)	1
US Billboard 200	43
US Independent Albums (Billboard)	4
US Top Alternative Albums (Billboard)	2
US Top Rock Albums (Billboard)	6
US Indie Store Album Sales (Billboard)	4
US Vinyl Albums (Billboard)	2

=== Year-end charts ===
Year-end chart performance for Punisher
Chart (2020)	Position
US Top Current Album Sales	160
Chart (2021)	Position
US Top Current Album Sales	50

== Certifications ==
Certifications for Punisher
Region	Certification	Certified units/sales
United Kingdom (BPI)	Gold	100,000^{‡}
United States (RIAA)	Gold	500,000^{‡}
^{‡} Sales+streaming figures based on certification alone.
