= Graceland Too =

Tourist attraction and shrine dedicated to Elvis Presley

Coordinates: 34.766642°N 89.445018°W

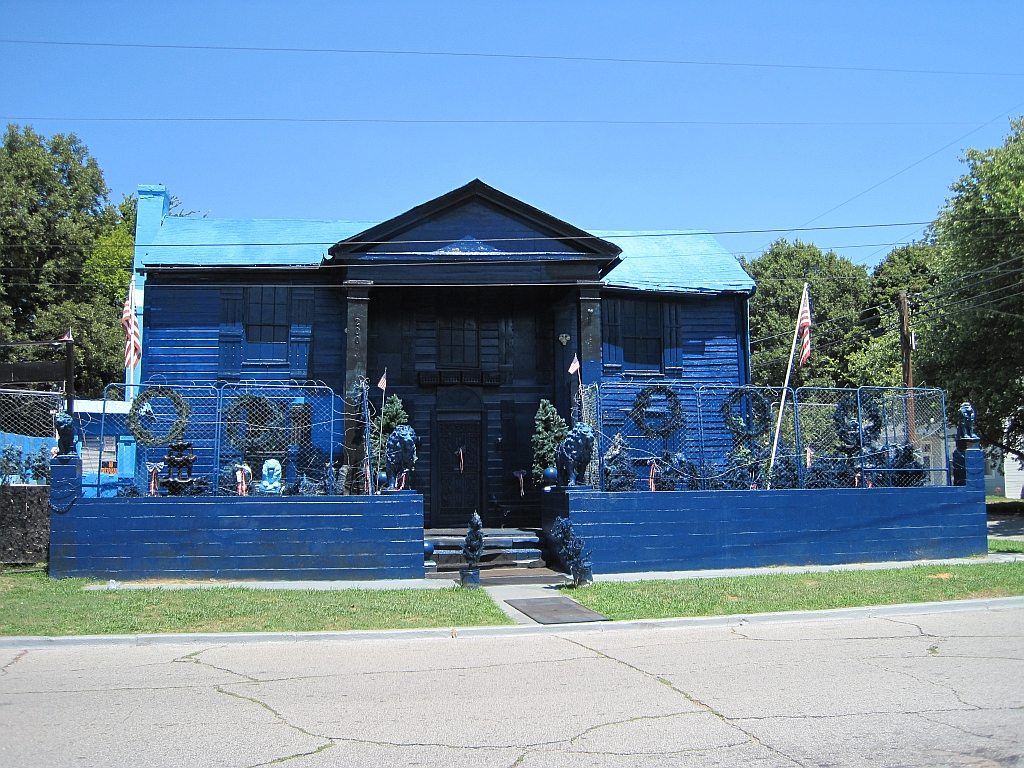
Graceland Too in 2012

Graceland Too was a tourist attraction and shrine dedicated to American singer Elvis Presley. It was located in Holly Springs, Mississippi, forty miles (64 km) south of the original Graceland, to which it had no affiliation. Graceland Too was operated out of the two-story home of Paul MacLeod, a Presley fanatic who collected hundreds of pieces of Elvis memorabilia. The shrine cost $5 ($6.80 in 2025) to enter and operated 24/7 year-round. The bizarre nature of the attraction, as well as MacLeod's eccentricity, made it a local landmark over its twenty-five years of operation.

The attraction closed in 2014 after MacLeod shot a man dead on the property, and died himself one day later. Its contents were auctioned off and the site was purchased by a couple.

== History ==
American singer and actor Elvis Presley rose to prominence in the mid-twentieth century, becoming a significant cultural icon due to his contributions to development of rock and roll music. Presley died in 1977 at his mansion, a 13.8-acre estate known as Graceland in Memphis, Tennessee. After his death, it was opened to the public as a museum in 1982, rapidly becoming one of the most popular domestic landmarks. It was once estimated that the museum attracts over 650,000 visitors per year—second only to the White House.

Paul MacLeod was born in Detroit, Michigan in 1942. He worked in prisons and at automobile assembly plants, but he was unemployed for the majority of his life. He developed an obsession with Presley at a young age; by the mid-1970s, he had relocated to Holly Springs, Mississippi—only forty miles south of Graceland. He was married twice throughout his life, with both women divorcing him due to his fixation on Presley. He opened Graceland Too in 1989 or 1990, and it became a local tourist attraction.

== Attraction ==
Graceland Too was located at 200 E. Gholson Avenue in Holly Springs. The two-story home—MacLeod occupying the top floor—was filled with Elvis paraphernalia to the point of being a fire hazard. MacLeod operated Graceland Too 24/7 and would personally give visitors a tour, claiming that his collection was valued at millions of dollars. He became renowned for his eccentricity, based upon his reverence for Elvis, and his claim to drink at least two dozen cans of soda per day. The home was routinely remodeled in various gaudy color choices; it was originally painted pink, then white, then blue. The home remained a popular tourist spot for years, particularly among students at the University of Mississippi.

The town's assistant director of tourism, Suzann William, claimed MacLeod was Holly Springs' number one tourist attraction.

=== Closure ===
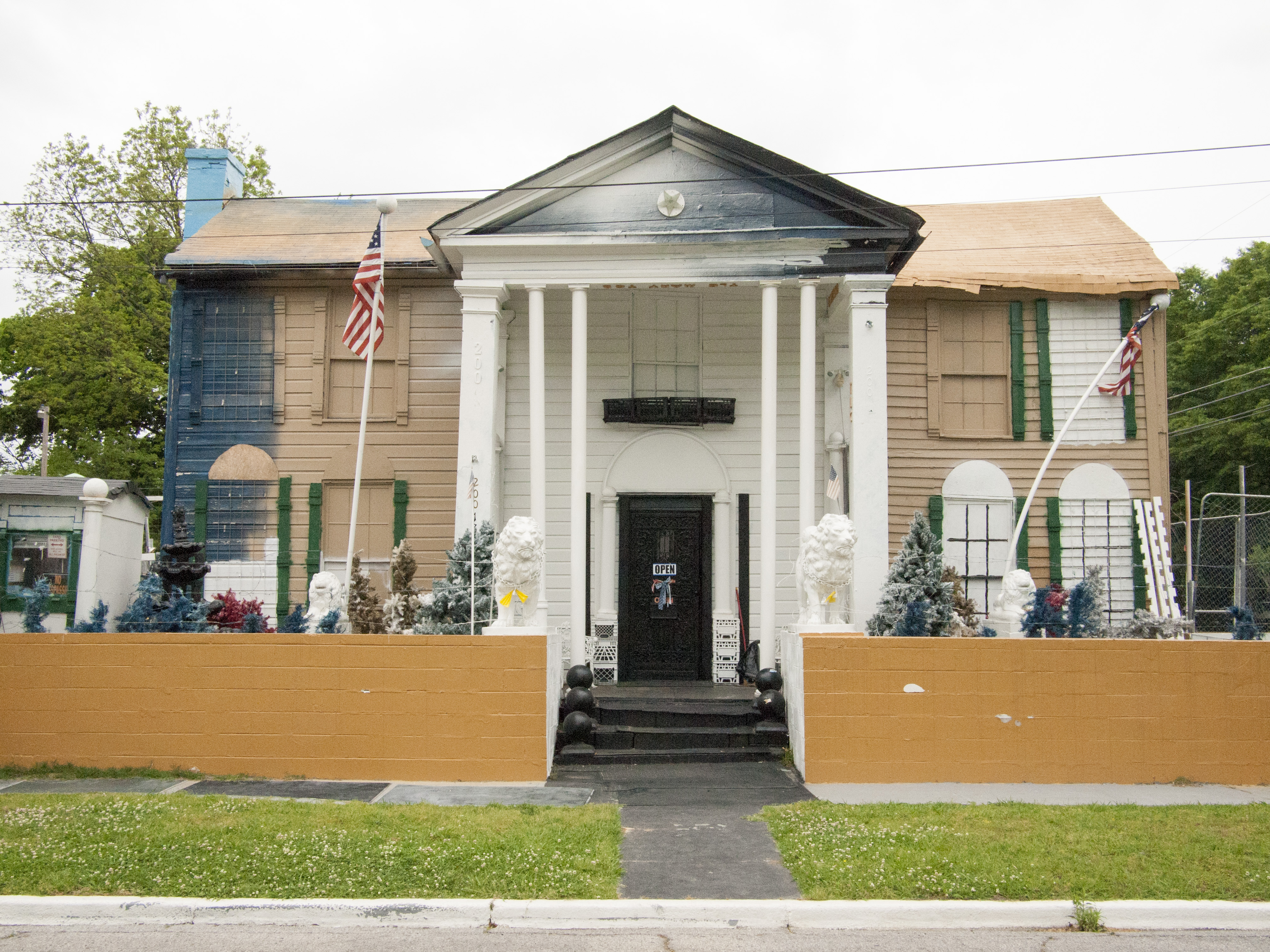
Graceland Too in May 2014, one month before its closure

In June 2014, MacLeod was involved in an altercation that resulted in the death of David Taylor, a twenty-eight-year-old Black man. Taylor had been assisting MacLeod with repainting the exterior, and the two were arguing over an unpaid ten dollars. MacLeod shot Taylor at point-blank range, killing him. MacLeod cooperated with police and was released with no charges filed. Thirty-six hours later, MacLeod suffered a heart attack and died on the front porch of Graceland Too. His death was mourned on social media and made national headlines. After his funeral a vigil was held at the museum; mourners decorated the property with cans of soda.

The contents of Graceland Too went up for auction in January 2015, with the entire lot of items sold for a reported $54,500 to an anonymous buyer from Georgia. An issue with the online bidding company required a new auction held that May. The vast majority of Graceland Too's property—including hundreds of pieces of Presley memorabilia—was sold for an undisclosed amount. Later that year, the home and all remaining property were purchased for $5,500 by Marie and Jeffrey Underwood, as well as members of the Friends of Graceland Too. As of 2022, Marie Underwood still dreams of reopening Graceland Too.

== In popular culture ==
Shortly after MacLeod's death, it was revealed that documentary filmmakers had been working for five years on a film about MacLeod and Graceland Too. The same week as the auction an art photography book, Graceland Too Revisited, was published by authors/photographers Darrin Devault and Tom Graves.

Graceland Too has been commemorated in American popular culture: indie rock band Parquet Courts were inspired to write "Uncast Shadow of a Southern Myth" (2014) after a visit to the museum, while singer-songwriter Phoebe Bridgers included a song named after Graceland Too on her 2020 album Punisher.

In 2022, Graceland Too: The Building Elvis Never Left, a play about MacLeod, Taylor, and the museum, written by Nicole Hughes with music by Matt Wood, premiered at the New York Theater Festival.

== See also ==
- List of music museums
