= Copycat Killer =

2020 remix EP by Phoebe Bridgers

EP / Remix album by Phoebe Bridgers featuring Rob Moose
- Released: November 20, 2020
- Length: 12:51
- Label: Dead Oceans
- Producer: Rob Moose

Phoebe Bridgers chronology
Punisher (2020)	Copycat Killer (2020)	The Record (2023)

Copycat Killer is a remix extended play by American singer-songwriter Phoebe Bridgers featuring American multi-instrumentalist and arranger Rob Moose. It was released on November 20, 2020, through Dead Oceans, with a vinyl version following on December 4, 2020. The EP features orchestral reworks of four songs from Bridgers' second studio album Punisher with new arrangements by Moose.

== Promotion ==
The EP was originally announced on November 10, 2020. The Copycat Killer version of "Kyoto" was released as a promotional single with a music video on the same day.

== Critical reception ==
Professional ratings
Aggregate scores
Source	Rating
Metacritic	73/100
Review scores
Source	Rating
Beats Per Minute	7/10 stars
Clash	7/10
Gigwise	7/10 stars
The Line of Best Fit	7/10
NME	4/5 stars
Pitchfork	7.2/10

The EP received a score of 73/100 from review aggregate site Metacritic, indicating "generally favorable reviews". Will Richards of NME praised the new arrangements, stating "this expansion of her sound opens the door for her to go anywhere she pleases in the future. Rarely does a remix EP recalibrate songs so thoroughly while maintaining every inch of their magic, but we should expect the unexpected from Phoebe Bridgers by now." Alex Rigotti of Gigwise was more indifferent towards the collection, calling it "a gorgeous rearrangement of her songs, but it adds little dimension to the world of Punisher". Katherine Rodgers complimented "Kyoto" and "Saviour Complex", but said that "Chinese Satellite" didn't add much to the original, and "'Punisher' has too delicate a melody to withstand much embellishment".

== Track listing ==
Copycat Killer track listing
No.	Title	Writer(s)	Length
1.	"Kyoto"	Phoebe Bridgers; Morgan Nagler; Marshall Vore	3:01
2.	"Savior Complex"	Bridgers; Christian Lee Hutson; Conor Oberst	3:24
3.	"Chinese Satellite"	Bridgers; Hutson; Oberst	3:30
4.	"Punisher"	Bridgers; Oberst; Vore	2:56
Total length:			12:51

== Charts ==
Chart performance for Copycat Killer
Chart (2021)	Peak position
US Billboard 200	78
US Independent Albums (Billboard)	7
US Top Alternative Albums (Billboard)	9
US Top Rock Albums (Billboard)	12
