= Huish =

Huish derives from the Old English word hīwisc meaning "household", and may be a place name element or a surname.

== People ==
- Huish (surname)

== Places ==
- Huish, Torridge, Devon, England, UK; near Merton
- Huish, North Devon District, Devon, England, UK; a location near Instow
- Huish, Wiltshire, England, UK

== Other uses ==
- Huish Athletic Ground, former ground of Yeovil Town F.C., Somerset, England
- Huish Park, current ground of Yeovil Town F.C.

== See also ==
- Huish Champflower, Somerset, England, UK
- Huish Episcopi, Somerset, England, UK
- North Huish, Devon, England, UK
- South Huish, Devon, England, UK
- Hardenhuish School, Chippenham, Wiltshire, UK
- Rodhuish Common, Somerset, UK
