= Garden Song (Phoebe Bridgers song) =

2020 single by Phoebe Bridgers

Single by Phoebe Bridgers

from the album Punisher
- Released: February 26, 2020
- Studio: Sound City (Los Angeles, California)
- Genre: Folk rock
- Length: 3:40
- Label: Dead Oceans
- Songwriters: Phoebe Bridgers; Christian Lee Hutson; Marshall Vore
- Producers: Tony Berg; Ethan Gruska; Phoebe Bridgers

Phoebe Bridgers singles chronology
"Enough For Now" (2020)	"Garden Song" (2020)	"Kyoto" (2020)

Music video
- "Garden Song" on YouTube

"Garden Song" is a song by American singer-songwriter Phoebe Bridgers. It was released through Dead Oceans on February 26, 2020, as the lead single from Bridgers' second studio album, Punisher (2020).

== Composition and lyrical interpretation ==
A folk rock ballad, "Garden Song" was produced by Bridgers herself alongside Tony Berg and Ethan Gruska. The song features a "wave of shimmery synths" and "delicate, crushing vocals", with its lyrics depicting "a scene from a fairytale, one that includes a house resting on a hill with thousands of roses (and probably a few ghosts)". It has been described as "lush and wet" as well as "steeped in melancholy" as Bridgers "unravels past memories that anticipated growing up".

Bridgers stated that the song was about "manifesting things the more you think about stuff" as well as "[her] own growth". The songwriting was stated to be "dreamlike and mundane", containing the lyrics: "The doctor put her hands over my liver / She told me my resentment's getting smaller". It also references her native Pasadena, California.

== Music video ==
The music video for the song was released on the same day as the single, and it was directed by Bridgers' younger brother, Jackson. It depicts Bridgers "kicking back in her bedroom, ripping on a bong and hanging out with fuzzy creatures", with an appearance by comedian Tig Notaro.

== Critical reception ==
Writing for Consequence of Sound, Dan Weiss praised the complexity of the songwriting. Deeming the song "an understated rumination on lost time and complicated nostalgia", Quinn Moreland of Pitchfork praised its "slight arrangement" and Bridgers' "humor and storytelling idiosyncrasies". Pitchfork and The New York Times listed "Garden Song" as the ninth and sixteenth best song of 2020, respectively.

== Charts ==
Chart (2020)	Peak position
US Hot Rock & Alternative Songs (Billboard)	42

== Certifications ==
Region	Certification	Certified units/sales
New Zealand (RMNZ)	Gold	15,000^{‡}
^{‡} Sales+streaming figures based on certification alone.
