= Hush... Hush, Sweet Charlotte (disambiguation) =

Hush... Hush, Sweet Charlotte may refer to:

- Hush… Hush, Sweet Charlotte, a 1964 thriller film directed by Robert Aldrich starring Bette Davis and Olivia de Havilland
- "Hush, Hush, Sweet Charlotte" (song), a song from the film
- Hush, Hush, Sweet Charlotte (album), a 1965 album by Patti Page, named after the song
