= Huish (surname) =

- Pronunciation: /ˈhuːɪʃ/
- Language: English

Origin
- Language: English
- Derivation: "hiwisc" (household)
- Meaning: "someone of the household"

Other names
- Variant forms: Huish; Hewish; Huyche; Huis; Hvysh

Huish is an English surname which derives from the Old English word hīwisc meaning "household". Notable people with the surname include:

- Alexander Huish (c.1594–1668), English cleric and academic
- David Huish (born 1944), Scottish golfer
- Francis Huish (1867–1955), English cricketer
- Fred Huish (1869–1957), English cricketer
- Justin Huish (born 1975), American archer
- Marcus Bourne Huish (1843–1921), English barrister
- Mark Huish (1808–1867), English railway manager
- Nicholas Huish (fl.1415), English politician
- Orson Pratt Huish (1851–1932), British-born American Latter Day Saint hymnwriter
- Richard Huish (died 1615), English merchant, founder of Richard Huish College, Taunton
- Robert Huish (1777–1850), English author
