= Beginners (album) =

Studio album by Christian Lee Hutson
- Released: May 29, 2020
- Studios: Sound City, Los Angeles
- Genres: Indie folk; folk rock
- Length: 36:35
- Label: Anti-
- Producer: Phoebe Bridgers

Christian Lee Hutson chronology
| Yeah Okay, I Know (2014) | Beginners (2020) | Quitters (2022) |

Beginners is the third studio album by the American musician Christian Lee Hutson. Huston had recorded multiple versions of Beginners starting in 2014, but was only satisfied with the final recording, produced by Phoebe Bridgers. It was released on May 29, 2020, under Anti- and received positive reviews from critics, who praised its lyrical content and sound.

== Background and composition ==
Hutson started working on Beginners in 2014. He recorded three versions of it before settling on the final version that was released. The first version was recorded with Dash Hutton and Dawes, while the third version was recorded with Ethan Gruska. However, Hutson remained dissatisfied with these versions. The final recording of the album was produced by Phoebe Bridgers, who Hutson had met through her guitarist, Harrison Whitford. Bridgers and Hutson both "immediately bonded… about their love for sparse recording". Hutson contributed to multiple Bridgers projects, including her 2020 album Punisher. Beginners was recorded at Sound City Studios, the same studio that Punisher was recorded. Hutson titled the album Beginners because he felt that he was "still just learning and trying to figure out how to navigate the world".

Beginners's songs contain acoustic fingerpicking and vocals accompanied by various kinds of instrumentations. Critics compared its sound to the musicians Elliott Smith and Sufjan Stevens. Hutson was inspired by Elliott Smith to utilize double tracked vocals, which according to Hutson helped make Beginners "sound like an album". Critics also noted that many of its songs featured lyrics about failed or dying relationships. "Talk" and "Lose This Number" were reimaginings of what adults were going through as Hutson was a child. Hutson considered "Northsiders" as representing "his time in high school, and the friendships he had back then". "Get the Old Band Back Together" was inspired by a band that Hutson grew up around that never ended up releasing music. The final song, "Single for the Summer", features a choral arrangement and what critics described as an uplifting end to the album.

== Critical reception ==
Professional ratings
Aggregate scores
| Source | Rating |
|---|---|
| Metacritic | 75/100 |
Review scores
| Source | Rating |
| Clash! | 7/10 |
| Exclaim! | 8/10 |
| The Line of Best Fit | 9.5/10 |
| Loud and Quiet | 9/10 |
| MusicOMH | 4/5 stars |
| Paste | 7.6/10 |
| Pitchfork | 7.8/10 |

According to the review aggregator Metacritic, Beginners received "generally favorable reviews" based on a weighted average score of 75 out of 100 from nine critic scores. Sam Gillett of Exclaim! thought that Beginners seemed "like an introduction to Hutson and his past… all packaged in a brilliant album that satisfies any cravings for well-written, subtle and resonant folk rock". In a The Line of Best Fit review, Steven Loftin praised the "unity between Hutson and his guitar" and described Beginners as a "vivid picture of life at its most relatable, and bleak, because that’s what growing up is - a cacophonous rage of failure and success". Isabel Crabtree of Loud and Quiet deemed Beginners as the kind of album "people will remember fondly in ten years, remembering when they first heard it, or list it on a social media quiz about which old albums they still listen to regularly". Chris White of MusicOMH wrote that Beginners was "poised and accomplished throughout, impeccably produced and arranged, with songs that feel confident and unhurried". Ellen Johnson in a Paste review praised Beginners as "a first chapter that will surely leave listeners eager to hear what [Hutson] comes up with next". In a Pitchfork review, Peyton Thomas praised the combination of Hutson's musical and Bridgers's production style, and believed that what helped Beginners stand out was "Hutson’s unflinching probes into human fallibility". Jess Wrigglesworth of Clash! noted that while some listeners would be put off by the "softboi cliche"-like lyrics, Beginners has an "honesty and humanity to [its] songs" and "gets richer with every listen, and cements Hutson’s status as a songwriter to take notice of.

== Track listing ==
Beginners track listing
| No. | Title | Length |
|---|---|---|
| 1. | "Atheist" | 3:00 |
| 2. | "Talk" | 2:57 |
| 3. | "Lose This Number" | 3:56 |
| 4. | "Unforgivable" | 3:34 |
| 5. | "Northsiders" | 3:43 |
| 6. | "Twin Soul" | 3:52 |
| 7. | "Seven Lakes" | 4:03 |
| 8. | "Get The Old Band Back Together" | 3:08 |
| 9. | "Keep You Down" | 4:22 |
| 10. | "Single For The Summer" | 3:57 |
| Total length: | | 36:35 |
