= Hush, Hamadan =

Hush هوش
- Village
- Location within Iran
- Coordinates: 34°37′30″N 48°08′32″E
- Country: Iran
- Province: Hamadan
- County: Tuyserkan
- Bakhsh: Qolqol Rud
- Rural District: Miyan Rud

Population (2006)
  - Total: 263
- Time zone: UTC+3:30 (IRST)
  - Summer (DST): UTC+4:30 (IRDT)

Hush (Persian: هوش, also Romanized as Hūsh) is a village in Miyan Rud Rural District, Qolqol Rud District, Tuyserkan County, Hamadan Province, Iran. At the 2006 census, its population was 263, in 52 families.
