= Khush Tazeh =

Khush Tazeh خوش تازه
- Village
- Country: Iran
- Province: East Azerbaijan
- County: Khoda Afarin
- Bakhsh: Minjavan
- Rural District: Dizmar-e Sharqi

Population (2006)
  - Total: 32
- Time zone: UTC+3:30 (IRST)
  - Summer (DST): UTC+4:30 (IRDT)

Khush Tazeh (Persian: خوش تازه, also Romanized as Khūsh Tāzeh; also known as Hūsh) is a village in Dizmar-e Sharqi Rural District, Minjavan District, Khoda Afarin County, East Azerbaijan Province, Iran. At the 2006 census, its population was 32, in 9 families.
