= The Sound of Hush =

Danish pop duo

- Origin: Denmark
- Genre: Pop
- Years active: 1997 -
- Label: Little Tornado
- Members: Dorthe Gerlach; Michael Hartmann
- Website: Hush.dk

Hush (regular title) is a Danish pop duo composing and performing music since 1997. The duo consists of singer Dorthe Gerlach and guitarist Michael Hartmann.

== History ==
Michael Hartmann has a past as a speed metal guitarist and musician for singer-songwriter Marie Frank, but in 1997 he chose to work with his own ideas. He met Dorthe Gerlach when she was singing as a busker in the streets of Randers, and at first they formed a group with three other musicians, playing with more tempo and rock than later. In 2000 the duo agreed to play a more calm and simple music, and they moved to Copenhagen. Here they tried for some time to get a record contract, but did not succeed despite radio rotation and a movie appearance.

The duo decided to go to a showcase in London in 2002 playing for the English music industry, where Tina Dico set them up with her English manager Jonathan Morley. He arranged for them to go to Nashville to exchange ideas with American songwriters in 2003, and this trip reaffirmed their belief of having a special musical expression. Another showcase in London brought good reviews in the British music press, and finally they got a contract with Universal. In 2004 their first album A Lifetime sold 20,000 copies in Denmark.

Since then, they have toured in various countries including UK and Canada, sometimes with support of musicians such as Sally Barris, other times acting as support for Turin Brakes and Stephen Fretwell in 2005, Jamie Cullum in 2006, and Runrig in 2010. Various artists have contributed to their music, including Billy Burnette.

In 2005 the duo agreed with VW about using the song "Lovestruck" from A Lifetime in a European commercial for the Polo.

== Music ==
The group differs from most pop groups in using instruments such as mandolin, banjo and mellotron.

== Discography ==
- A Lifetime (2004)
- For All the Right Reasons (2007)
- Backroads (2008)
- Dark Horse (2011)
- Sand (2018)
- Fading Into Golden (2024)

== Awards ==
The group was nominated for five categories in the 2005 Danish Music Awards, but did not win. They won a European Border Breaker award in 2005 as one of the European artists whose debut album have sold the most in the EU outside their own country.
