= Kyoto (Phoebe Bridgers song) =

2020 single by Phoebe Bridgers

- The Marías remix version cover

Single by Phoebe Bridgers

from the album Punisher
- Released: April 9, 2020
- Studio: Sound City (Los Angeles, California)
- Genre: Indie rock; pop rock; garage rock
- Length: 3:04
- Label: Dead Oceans
- Songwriters: Phoebe Bridgers; Morgan Nagler; Marshall Vore
- Producers: Tony Berg; Ethan Gruska; Phoebe Bridgers

Phoebe Bridgers singles chronology
"Garden Song" (2020)	"Kyoto" (2020)	"ICU" (2020)

Music video
- "Kyoto" on YouTube

"Kyoto" is a song by American singer-songwriter, Phoebe Bridgers. It was released on April 9, 2020 as the second single from her second studio album, Punisher (2020). Rolling Stone, Billboard, Paste, Variety, Consequence of Sound, and The Line of Best Fit all ranked the song among the best of 2020, the latter placing the song atop its list. At the 2021 Grammy Awards, "Kyoto" was nominated for Best Rock Performance and Best Rock Song.

== Background and composition ==
"Kyoto" has been described to be an indie rock, grunge-rock, pop rock, and garage rock song. Bridgers wrote the song about her complicated, evolving relationship with her father. Her parents divorced when she was 20, leaving Bridgers angry. The song is named for the city in Japan; Bridgers wrote the song on her first trip to the country in February 2019. A lyric observing that Japan "still" has pay phones – the sentiment being that they are long outdated – was entirely fictional, Bridgers said. In a press statement, Bridgers expounded upon the song's meaning:

This song is about impostor syndrome. About being in Japan for the first time, somewhere I’ve always wanted to go, and playing my music to people who want to hear it, feeling like I'm living someone else's life. I dissociate when bad things happen to me, but also when good things happen. It can feel like I'm performing what I think I'm supposed to be like.

Producer Tony Berg suggested she speed up the song's tempo, creating a brighter, more upbeat tone. Bridgers agreed, growing "sick" of recording slower ballads. "Kyoto" is instrumentally dense, incorporating twelve-string guitar, synthesizers, Autoharp, and mellotron. Bright Eyes' Nathaniel Walcott also contributes horns, while Jenny Lee Lindberg of Warpaint adds vocals.

A new version of the song, featuring a new arrangement from composer Rob Moose was released on November 10, 2020 as the first single from Bridgers and Moose's collaborative Copycat Killer EP. Bridgers also shared an acoustic version of the song as a Spotify exclusive in March 2021, featuring guitar and backing vocals from American singer-songwriter Jackson Browne.

== Music video ==
The song's music video was initially slated to have been filmed in Kyoto proper. Bridgers planned the shoot to take place during a trip to Japan, supporting the National in March 2020, though these dates were cancelled due to the COVID-19 pandemic. Instead, the clip was recorded in front of a green screen in Los Angeles. It pictures Bridgers in a skeleton costume and superimposed over stock footage of Kyoto, including images of an arcade and at the Fushimi Inari-taisha shrine. She flies over the city and an ocean at points in the clip. The video includes appearances by Emily Bannon, Marshall Vore and Harrison Whitford—members of Bridgers' touring band. At one point in the video, the three are saved from Godzilla by Bridgers, as she shoots lasers from her eyes. The video was directed and edited by Nina Ljeti.

== Live performances ==
In promotion of the single, Bridgers played the song on Jimmy Kimmel Live! remotely from a bathtub in her home while playing a Suzuki QChord and singing into a toy microphone. Bridgers did another remote performance of the song on The Late Show with Stephen Colbert on July 20, 2020. On September 12, 2020 Bridgers performed the song on CBS This Morning alongside other Punisher tracks. She performed the song again on The Late Late Show with James Corden on December 16, 2020, this time while lying down in bed and looking at her phone before walking over to perform at a green screen-ed Carnegie Hall. She performed the song on her Saturday Night Live debut on February 6, 2021.

== Accolades ==
Year	Organization	Award	Result	Ref
2021	Grammy Awards	Best Rock Performance	Nominated	
2021	Grammy Awards	Best Rock Song	Nominated	

== Personnel ==
- Tony Berg – electric guitar, autoharp
- Phoebe Bridgers – baritone electric guitar, rubber-bridge guitar, electric guitar, lead vocals
- Ethan Gruska – synthesizers, electric guitar, Mellotron
- Jenny Lee Lindberg – bass
- Joseph Lorge – electric guitar
- Marshall Vore – drums, percussion
- Nathaniel Walcott – horns
- Harrison Whitford – electric guitar, 12-string acoustic guitar, 12-string electric guitar, high strung acoustic guitar

== Charts ==
=== Weekly charts ===
Weekly chart performance for "Kyoto"
Chart (2020–2021)	Peak position
Scottish Singles Sales (Official Charts)	7
US Hot Rock & Alternative Songs (Billboard)	32
US Rock & Alternative Airplay (Billboard)	34

=== Year-end charts ===
Year-end chart performance for "Kyoto"
Chart (2020)	Position
US Adult Alternative Songs (Billboard)	44

== Certifications ==
Certifications for "Kyoto"
Region	Certification	Certified units/sales
New Zealand (RMNZ)	Gold	15,000^{‡}
United Kingdom (BPI)	Silver	200,000^{‡}
^{‡} Sales+streaming figures based on certification alone.
