= Rob Moose =

American musician (born 1982)

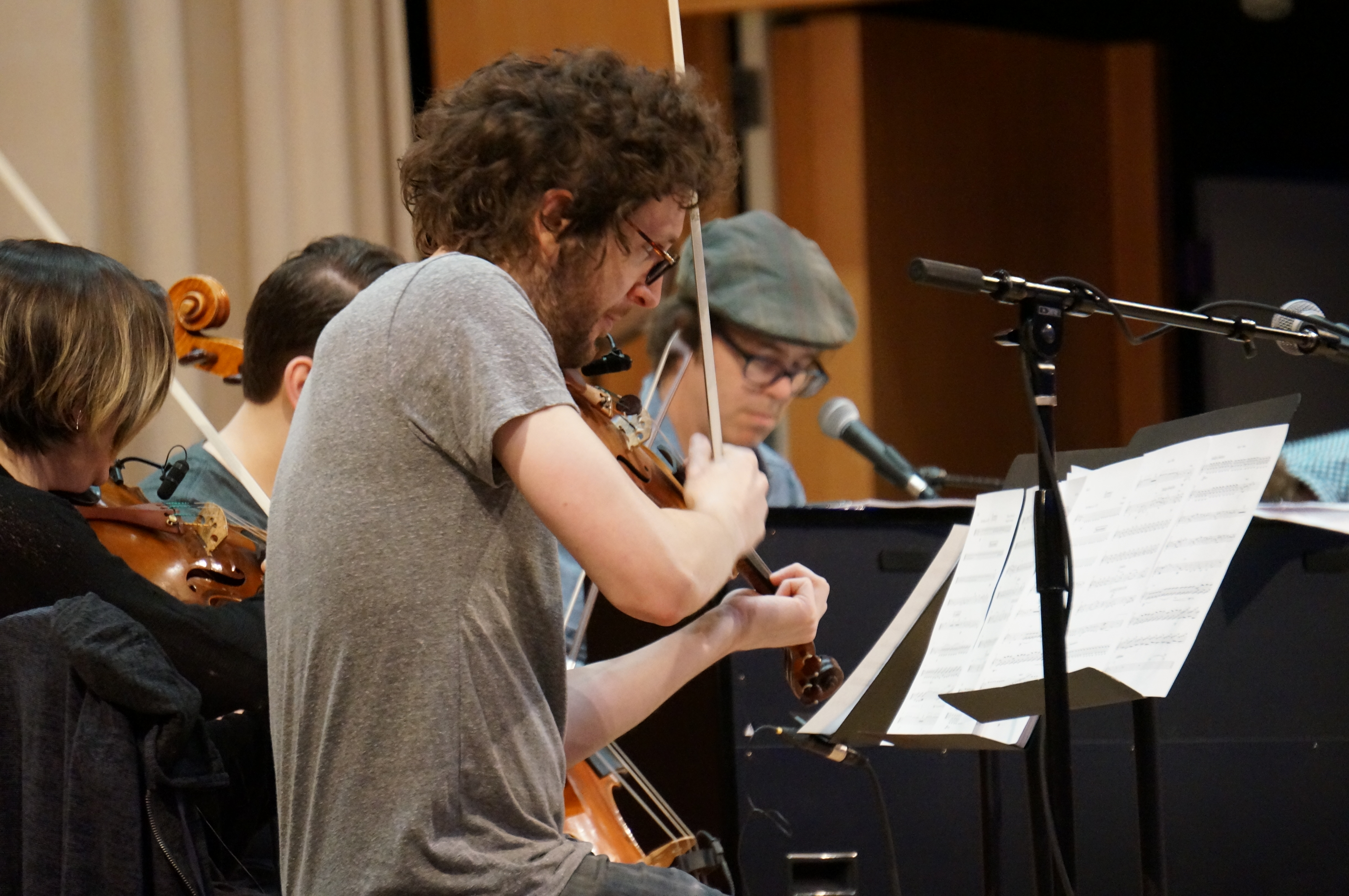
- Rob Moose performing with Ben Folds and yMusic at Duke University in April 2015

Background information
- Born: 1982 (age 43–44)
- Origin: New York City
- Occupations: Musician; arranger; producer; conductor; orchestrator
- Instruments: Violin; viola; guitar; mandolin; vocals
- Years active: 2005–present
- Website: robmoose.com

Rob Moose (born 1982) is an American multi-instrumentalist, arranger, producer, conductor, and orchestrator. He primarily plays the violin, viola, and guitar.

== Early life and education ==
Moose was born in 1982. He was raised in Windsor, Connecticut and learned piano and violin at The Hartt School. He attended the Loomis Chaffee School through 10th grade, before moving with his family to Moorestown, New Jersey. He completed high school at Moorestown Friends School, graduating in 2000. Moose studied violin at the Manhattan School of Music in New York City. He began a master's program in American studies at Columbia University, but left to join Antony and the Johnsons on tour in 2005.

== Career ==
=== Instrumentalist ===
Moose met Sufjan Stevens in 2004 after being introduced to him by My Brightest Diamond's Shara Nova, who was then a member of Stevens' touring band. Moose made his first major contribution in 2005, playing violin on Stevens' album Illinois (2005).

As a violinist, violist, guitarist, and mandolinist, Moose has performed on close to 500 albums, including albums by artists such as Gwen Stefani, Maren Morris, Rufus Wainwright, Alabama Shakes, John Legend, and Joshua Bell. He appeared on the Grammy Award-winning albums High Wide & Handsome: The Charlie Poole Project (2009) by Loudon Wainwright III and The Suburbs (2010) by Arcade Fire. In addition, he has contributed to Nico Muhly's score for Howards End (2017) and Nicholas Britell's scores for Free State of Jones (2016) and Battle of the Sexes (2017).

=== Arranger ===
Moose has worked as a music arranger for records by numerous artists including The Decemberists, Interpol, The National, St. Vincent, Bon Iver, Tune-Yards, LeAnn Rimes, They Might Be Giants, Trey Anastasio, Bruce Hornsby, Paul Simon, Sara Bareilles, Punch Brothers, Phoebe Bridgers, and Taylor Swift. His relationship with Blake Mills has resulted in collaborations on albums by John Legend, Alabama Shakes, Laura Marling, Jim James, Perfume Genius, Dawes and Jesca Hoop. Moose has also contributed arrangements to classical artists such as Joshua Bell and Renée Fleming, and his work was featured on the Grammy Award-winning album High Wide & Handsome: The Charlie Poole Project (2009) by Loudon Wainwright III.

Moose has contributed to three benefit albums by Red Hot Organization, including interpreting Johann Sebastian Bach piano works as a duo with mandolinist Chris Thile on Red Hot + Bach (2014). Moose has also been a frequent contributor to Ben Folds' Declassified Series with the National Symphony Orchestra, writing charts for Sara Bareilles, Regina Spektor, Emily King and Blake Mills.

=== Conducting and performing ===
In 2007, Moose made his debut as a conductor and orchestrator in a performance with Sufjan Stevens at the John F. Kennedy Center for the Performing Arts Opera House. He was the conductor on Antony and the Johnsons' live album Cut the World (2012). He has worked as a conductor at numerous venues, including the Walt Disney Concert Hall and the Royal Opera House. Moose has also conducted orchestras in performance for Anohni, Sufjan Stevens, and Bruce Hornsby. Moose's orchestrations have been performed by Laura Marling and 12 Ensemble, Amos Lee with the Colorado Symphony, and by the Dallas Symphony Orchestra.

Moose has toured with Antony and the Johnsons, Sufjan Stevens, The National, Beth Orton, Glen Hansard, and Blake Mills, and My Brightest Diamond. He has also played viola in performance with Jay-Z and played violin in performance for Savion Glover, Josh Groban, Vampire Weekend, and Duncan Sheik. Recently, Moose served as the musical director for Sara Bareilles' "Amidst the Chaos" tour in 2019.

=== Production ===
Moose has worked as a producer on Ben Folds' So There (2015), Gabriel Kahane's The Ambassador (2014), Time for Three's 2014 eponymous debut album, My Brightest Diamond's All Things Will Unwind (2011) The Staves and yMusic's collaborative album The Way Is Read (2017), Phoebe Bridgers' EP Copycat Killer (2020), and BrhyM's (Bruce Hornsby and yMusic) Deep Sea Vents.

=== yMusic ===
Moose is a founding member of the New York sextet chamber ensemble yMusic. Moose formed yMusic with trumpeter CJ Camerieri in Brooklyn in 2008. The ensemble consists of a trumpet, flute, clarinet, violin, viola, and cello. As of 2020, yMusic has released five studio albums. yMusic play classical and pop music compositions and also assist other artists in adding classical elements to their music. After collaborating on Ben Folds' album So There (2015) yMusic joined the "Ben Folds & yMusic" tour in 2015 and 2016, performing in the US, UK and Australia and at the Bonnaroo Music Festival and the Holland Festival. They also collaborated with Swedish singer José González on a 16-date concert tour reimagining original works at venues such as the Walt Disney Concert Hall and the Beacon Theatre. González described the collaboration as "it feels like it opens us up from sounding energetic and avant-garde to classic and delicate."

=== Bon Iver ===
In 2011, Moose joined Bon Iver. He contributed musical arrangements and recorded strings for the group's self-titled second album, Bon Iver (2011). The album was certified platinum by the Recording Industry Association of America (RIAA) in 2019. The album won Best Alternative Music Album at the 2012 Grammy Awards, while the band won Best New Artist for their work on it. Moose toured with Bon Iver, including performing four sold-out concerts at Radio City Music Hall and an appearance on Saturday Night Live. Bon Iver's third studio album, 22, A Million (2016), featured Moose's violin and viola arrangements on "22 (OVER S∞∞N)" and saxophone arrangements by Moose throughout. Moose contributed to the band's fourth studio album, I, I (2019). Moose contributed violin, viola, octave viola, piano, string arrangements, and all "Worm Crew" arrangements. He served as the "Worm Crew" conductor. Moose has songwriting credits on "iMi", "Holyfields", and "Marion". Moose contributed viola, violin and string arrangements to the band's fifth studio album, Sable, Fable (2025).

=== Miscellaneous ===
From 2019 to 2020, Moose contributed musical analysis of popular songs to the Headgum podcast Punch Up the Jam.

== Discography ==
=== Extended plays ===
Title	EP details	Peak chart positions			
Title	EP details	US	US Alt	US Indie	US Rock
Copycat Killer (with Phoebe Bridgers)	Released: November 20, 2020; Label: Dead Oceans; Format: Vinyl, digital download, streaming	78	9	7	12
Inflorescence	Released: August 11, 2023; Label: Sony Masterworks; Format:	–	–	–	–

=== Singles ===
Title	Year	Album
"I Bend But Never Break" (featuring Brittany Howard)	2023	Inflorescence
"Wasted" (featuring Phoebe Bridgers)	2023	Inflorescence
"Marvel Room" (featuring Bon Iver)	2023	Inflorescence
"—" denotes a recording that did not chart.
