= Christian Lee Hutson =

American musician

- Hutson performing in April 2026
- Born: November 5, 1990 (age 36); Kansas City, Missouri, U.S.
- Spouse: Maya Hawke (m. 2026)
- Musical career
- Origin: Los Angeles, California, U.S.
- Genre: Indie folk
- Label: Anti-
- Website: christianleehutson.com

Christian Lee Hutson (born November 5, 1990) is an American singer, musician and songwriter. He began his career as a member of The Driftwood Singers before signing to ANTI- as a solo artist in 2019. He has released three full-length albums: Beginners (2020), Quitters (2022) and Paradise Pop. 10 (2024). The records were co-produced by his friend and fellow musician, Phoebe Bridgers.

In addition to his collaborations with Bridgers, Hutson is known for co-writing and performing songs with Samia, Marshall Vore, Whitmer Thomas, Conor Oberst, and Ethan Gruska.

== Early life ==
Hutson was born in Kansas City, Missouri on November 5, 1990. He moved to Los Angeles at the age of five shortly after his mother remarried. Hutson grew up in Santa Monica with dreams to become a novelist. According to a 2020 Under the Radar profile, he attended a fundamentalist Christian elementary school. He began playing guitar at 12. The first song he learned to play was Elizabeth Cotten's "Freight Train". His earliest attempts at songwriting were influenced by vintage country records in his father's record collection, including some Hank Williams albums.

As a teenager, Hutson enjoyed the music of John Prine, Bright Eyes, and Elliott Smith. He dropped out of high school to pursue a musical career, against his parents wishes. Hutson's adolescent experiences later inspired the lyrics of "Northsiders" and "Seven Lakes", which are on his 2020 album Beginners.

== Career ==
=== The Driftwood Singers (c. 2010–2013) ===
Before embarking on a solo career, Hutson performed with Pearl Charles in The Driftwood Singers. According to a January 2011 Amarillo Globe-News article, The Driftwood Singers have "an affinity and talent for the traditional country folk sound". They began as an eight-piece ensemble, composed of students from the California Institute of the Arts in Valencia, California, before becoming a duo.

Hutson and Charles released their first EP, Look!, in November 2011. The Driftwood Singers released a single, "I Don't Live Here Anymore" and a self-titled album in 2012. By February 2013, Hutson and Charles had ended their musical partnership.

=== Solo career and collaborations with Phoebe Bridgers (2014–2019) ===
Hutson recorded his debut EP, We Will Never Break Up, in 2012. His first solo album, The Hell With It, was released on the independent label Trailer Fire Records in 2013. Trailer Fire Records also released Hutson's sophomore solo record, Yeah Okay, I Know, in 2014. The album was produced by David Mayfield, who was nominated for an Grammy Award. It spawned numerous singles including "They're Gonna Hate Me", "Dirty Little Cheat", and "Mess". As with The Hell With It, Yeah Okay, I Know was not widely reviewed and is not available on streaming services.

Hutson was introduced to Phoebe Bridgers by her touring guitarist, Harrison Whitford, in 2018. Hutson has since co-written many songs on three projects featuring Bridgers – boygenius (2018), Better Oblivion Community Center (2019), and Punisher (2020). He supported Bridgers on her 2019 world tour and also opened for boygenius’ on their 2019 European tour. Hutson performed as a touring guitarist for Jenny Lewis during that time, in addition to supporting Julia Jacklin, a singer from New South Wales, Australia and a band, Okkervil River.

=== Beginners and The Version Suicides (2020–2021) ===
Hutson was signed to Anti– in 2019. He released his first studio album, Beginners, on May 29, 2020. Beginners was named after the Raymond Carver short story cycle with the same name. Maeri Ferguson of No Depression said it has "a spare and quiet collection of songs about the tenderness of adolescence, first love, heartbreak and the value of having a little perspective". It was preceded by the single ‘Northsiders’. Beginners was produced by Phoebe Bridgers. Prior to the recording sessions with Bridgers, four versions of Beginners were completed. The first version featured the band Dawes and Dash Hutton, a former drummer for the band Haim, and it was recorded in 2015. The third version was produced by Ethan Gruska, who previously collaborated with Fiona Apple and Blake Mills from Malibu, California. Meanwhile, the second and fourth versions were produced by unknown parties and failed to gain traction.

The final version of Beginners features contributions from Lucy Dacus, Conor Oberst, and Meg Duffy of Hand Habits. It was well-received by critics; earning a score of 7.8 from Pitchfork, alongside a Metascore of 75 signaling 'mostly positive reviews'. Hutson released three EPs between 2020 and 2021, collectively known as 'The Version Suicides'. The three volumes contain contributions from musicians including Shamir, Fenne Lily, and Julia Jacklin, and have a combination of humorous and sincere covers. Liz Phair's "Why Can’t I?", Taylor Swift’s "betty", and The Cure's "Just Like Heaven" are among the songs Hutson has covered.

In 2021, Hutson was featured on Saving for a Custom Van, a compilation and tribute to music by the late Adam Schlesinger. Huston performed "Red Dragon Tattoo", a song by the Fountains of Wayne. Before the release of Quitters in 2022, he performed on projects released by Hand Habits, Ada Lea from Montreal, Canada, Whitmer Thomas, and Sasami.

=== Quitters (2022–present) ===
Hutson began writing Quitters, his second album to be released via ANTI-, during the COVID-19 quarantine. The record was produced by Bridgers and Conor Oberst and eventually released on April 1, 2022. Quitters was preceded by the lead single "Rubberneckers", co-written by Alex Lahey. Two more singles, "Age Difference" and "Strawberry Lemonade", were released in support of the album.

Hutson said Quitters lyrically touches on "adult experiences and changes and trying to become okay with yourself". The LP draws from numerous influences including Somewhere, directed by Sofia Coppola, The Sarah Book by Scott McClanahan, and the Paolo Sorrentino film Youth. Quitters was recorded directly to analog tape, rather than digitally to add warmth to the arrangements.

Like its predecessor, Quitters was reviewed by music publications including Pitchfork and The Line of Best Fit. Pitchfork gave the album a rating of 7.5. It received a 74 Metascore suggesting ‘generally favorable reviews’. Between 2022 and 2023, Hutson opened for Phoebe Bridgers on her international Reunion Tour.

== Musical style ==
Rolling Stone described Hutson's music as a combination of "folk", "Americana" and "retro-country". Hutson cites Elliott Smith, Hank Williams, Gillian Welch, Randy Newman and John Prine as being his influences.

Hutson plays acoustic guitar, banjo, mandolin and fiddle. His early recordings possess a DIY or lo-fi quality; Bridgers attempted to preserve the “homespun” nature of Hutson’s original Voice Memo demos when producing Beginners. He enjoys the prose of George Saunders, Haruki Murakami, Sally Rooney, and Raymond Carver. He says that the authors have inspired his songwriting.

== Personal life ==
Hutson was married to Sharon Silva, a Los Angeles singer-songwriter. Since 2023, he has been in a relationship with actress and singer-songwriter Maya Hawke. Hutson and Hawke married in New York City on February 14, 2026.

Hutson has been diagnosed with primarily obsessional OCD (pure O); he said writing the Quitters song "OCDemon" was a "therapeutic exercise". In 2020, he gave free guitar lessons on Zoom in support of the Black Lives Matter movement. He has supported various bail projects throughout the U.S. He has several tattoos; one is a tribute to Hank Williams.

== Discography ==
=== Studio albums ===
Title	Details
The Hell with It	Released: 2013; Label: Self-released; Formats: CD
Yeah Okay, I Know	Released: 2014; Label: Trailer Fire; Formats: CD, LP
Beginners	Released: May 29, 2020; Label: ANTI-; Formats: CD, LP, digital download, streaming
Quitters	Released: April 1, 2022; Label: Anti-; Formats: CD, LP, digital download, streaming
Paradise Pop. 10	Released: September 27, 2024; Label: Anti-; Formats: CD, LP, digital download, streaming

=== Extended plays ===
Title	Details
Will Never Break Up	Released: 2012; Label: Self-released; Formats: CD
Christian Lee Hutson on Audiotree Live	Released: August 3, 2016; Label: Audiotree; Formats: Digital download, streaming
Jam in the Van – Christian Lee Hutson	Released: February 25, 2017; Label: Jam in the Van; Formats: Digital download, streaming
The Version Suicides, Vol. 1	Released: January 15, 2021; Label: Anti-; Formats: Digital download, streaming
The Version Suicides, Vol. 2	Released: March 15, 2021; Label: Anti-; Formats: Digital download, streaming
The Version Suicides, Vol. 3	Released: August 6, 2021; Label: Anti-; Formats: Digital download, streaming

=== Singles ===
Title	Year	Details
"Northsiders"	2019	Beginners
"Strawberry Lemonade"	2021	Quitters
"Rubberneckers"	2022	Quitters
"Age Difference"	2022	Quitters
