= List of songs recorded by Phoebe Bridgers =

Songs by American singer-songwriter

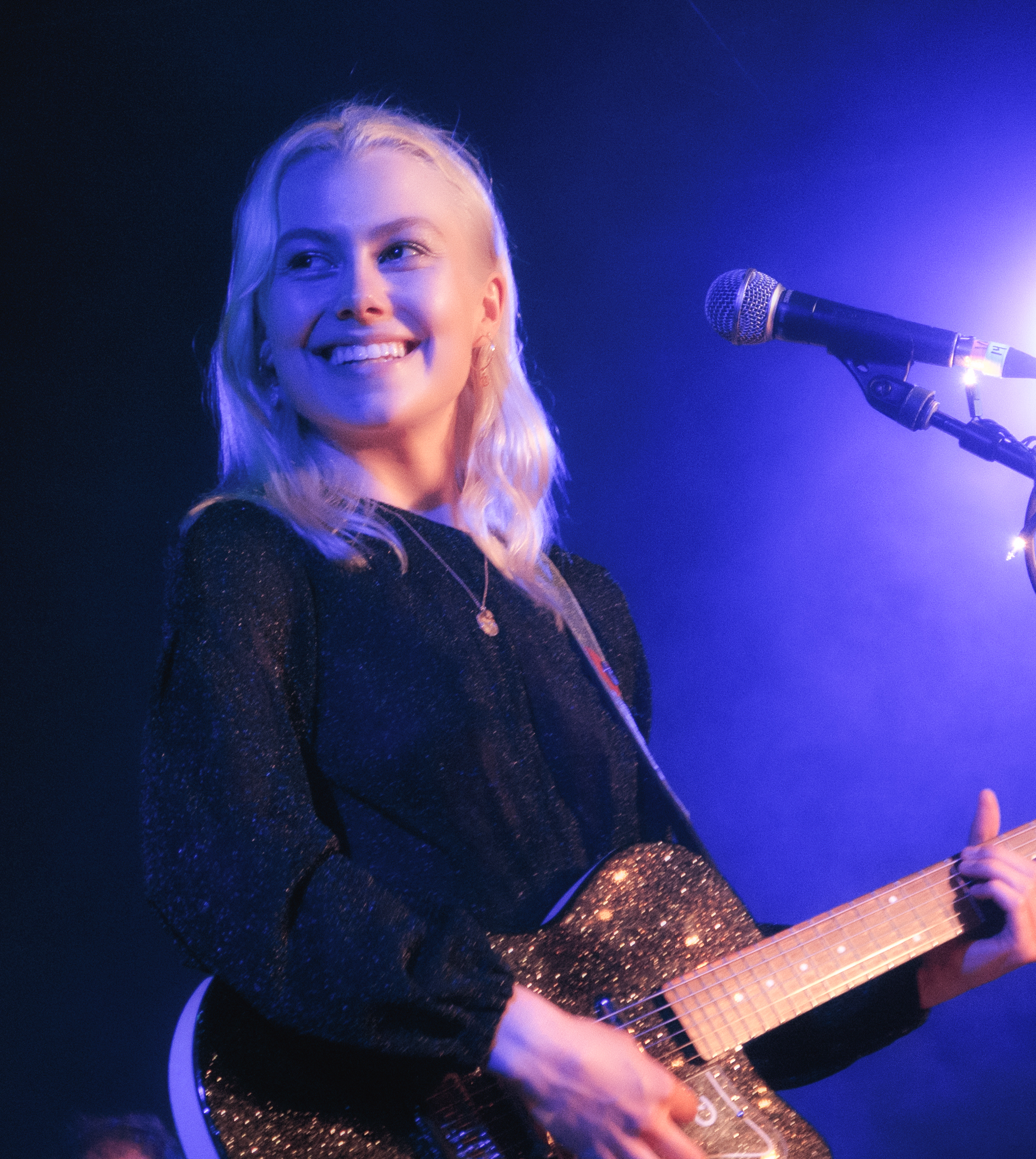
Bridgers performing in 2018

American singer-songwriter Phoebe Bridgers has recorded songs for two studio albums, nine extended plays and other album or singles appearances.

After signing a recording contract with Dead Oceans in June 2017, Bridgers released her debut studio album, Stranger in the Alps on September 22. She then released her sophomore studio album, Punisher on June 17, 2020.

Bridgers also recorded songs with her supergroups Boygenius and Better Oblivion Community Center, as well as a bassist and background vocalist for band Sloppy Jane from 2014 to 2015. In addition to her own music career, she also provided guest background vocals for some musicians, including bandmates Julien Baker and Lucy Dacus, Fiona Apple, Lorde, Bright Eyes, The 1975, and Hayley Williams.

== Songs ==
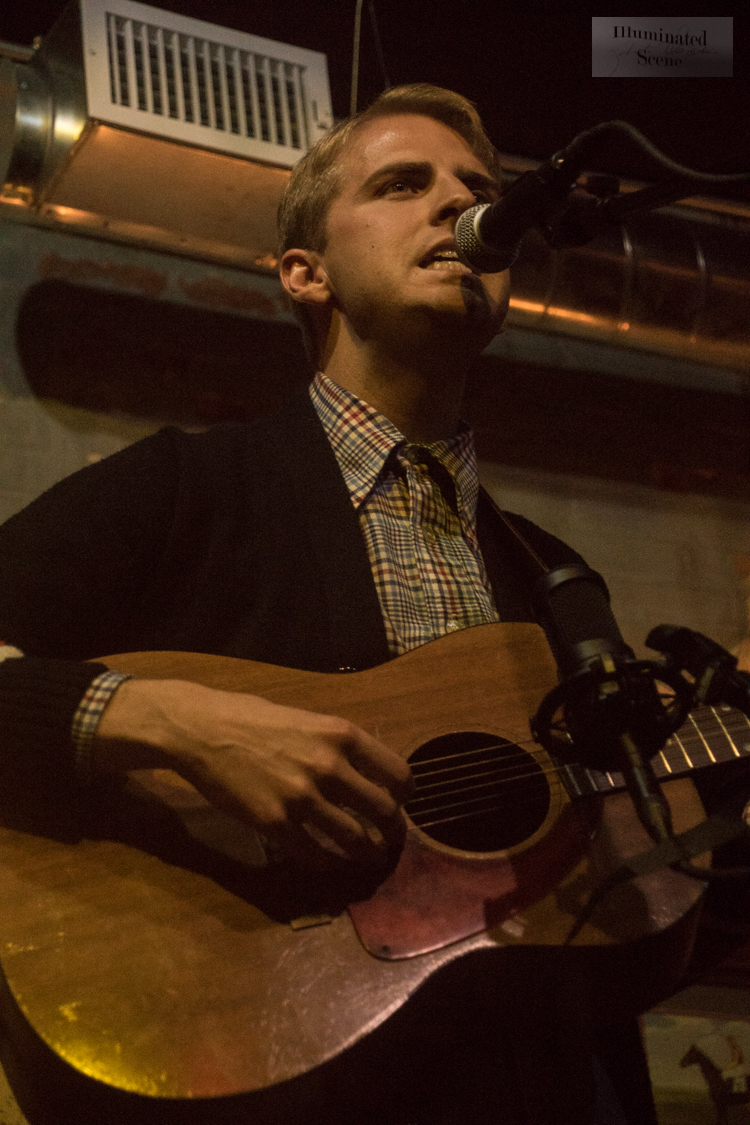
Christian Lee Hutson (pictured) co-wrote five tracks for Bridgers' second studio album Punisher (2020).

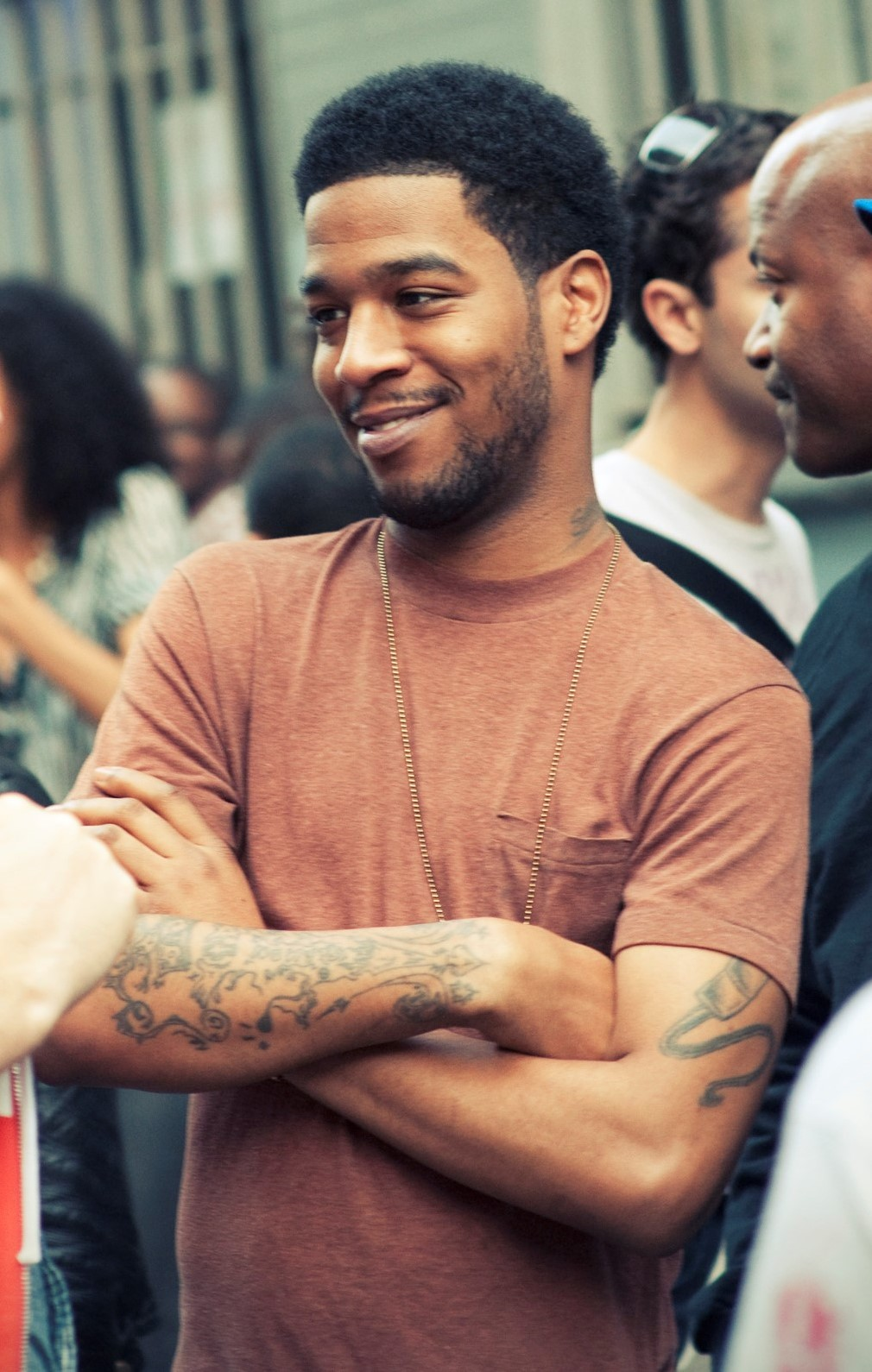
Kid Cudi collaborated with Bridgers on "Lovin' Me" of his seventh studio album Man on the Moon III: The Chosen (2020).

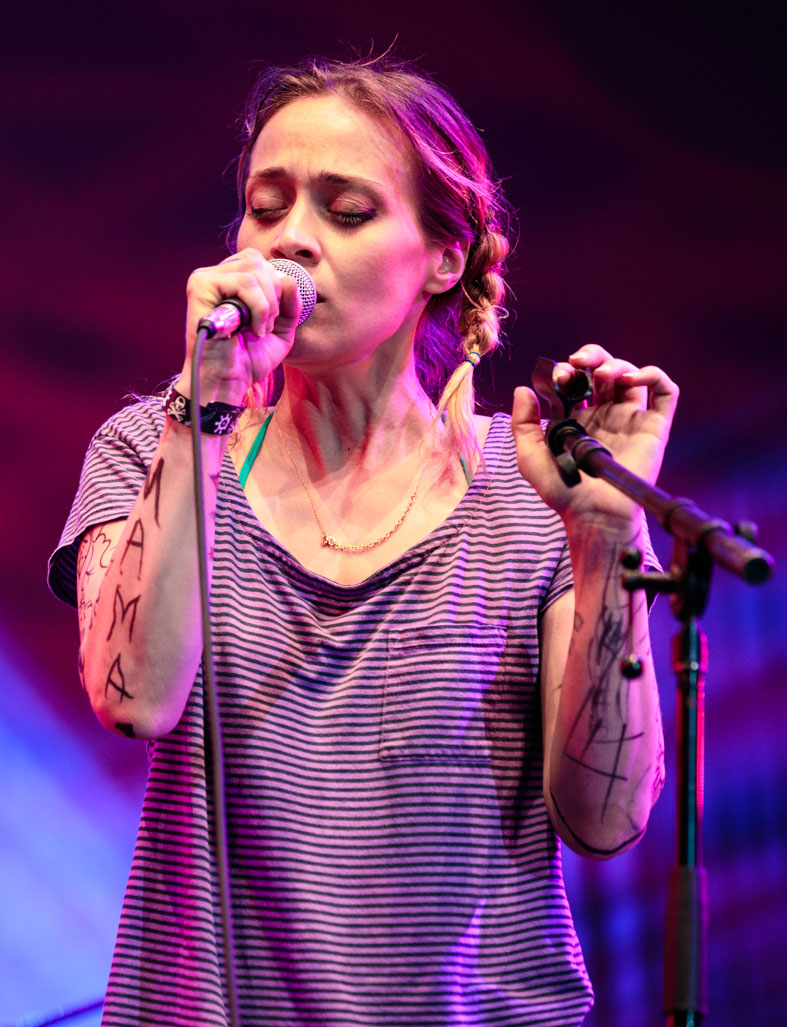
Bridgers featured Fiona Apple (pictured) in her Christmas cover of "7 O'Clock News/Silent Night" (2020), while Bridgers provided background vocals on Apple's cover of "The Whole of the Moon" (2021).

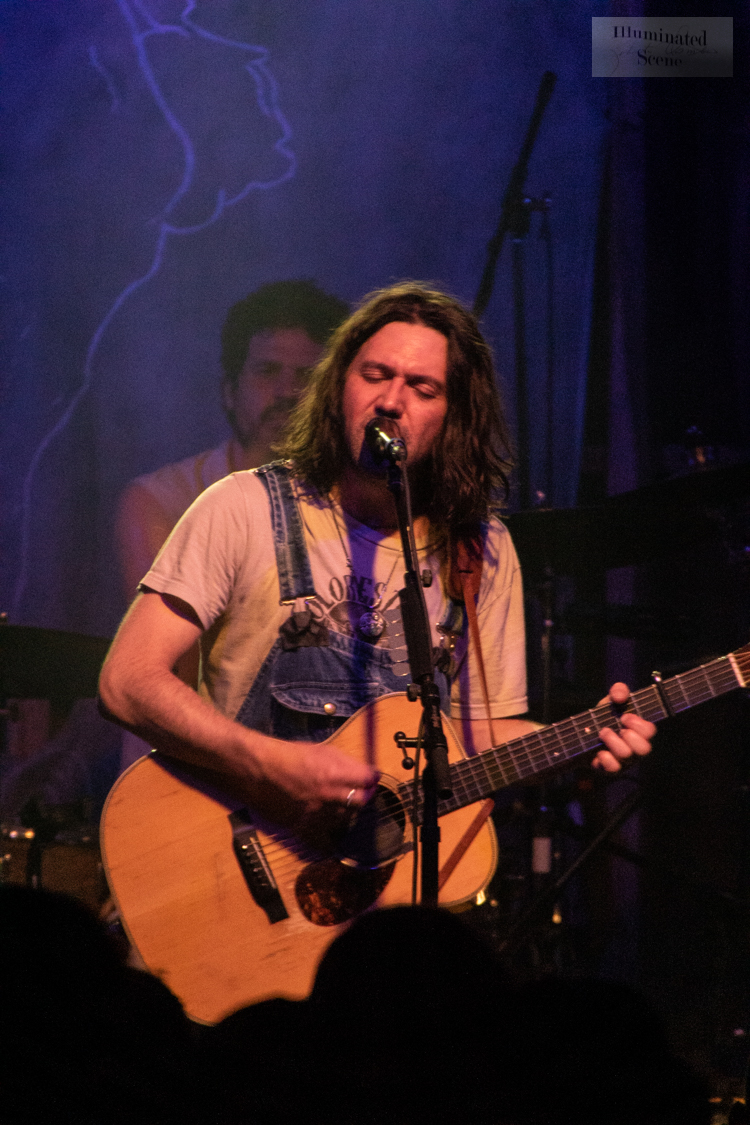
Bridgers formed a supergroup with Conor Oberst (pictured) named Better Oblivion Community Center. She was also featured in various projects by Oberst, including his band Bright Eyes's music.

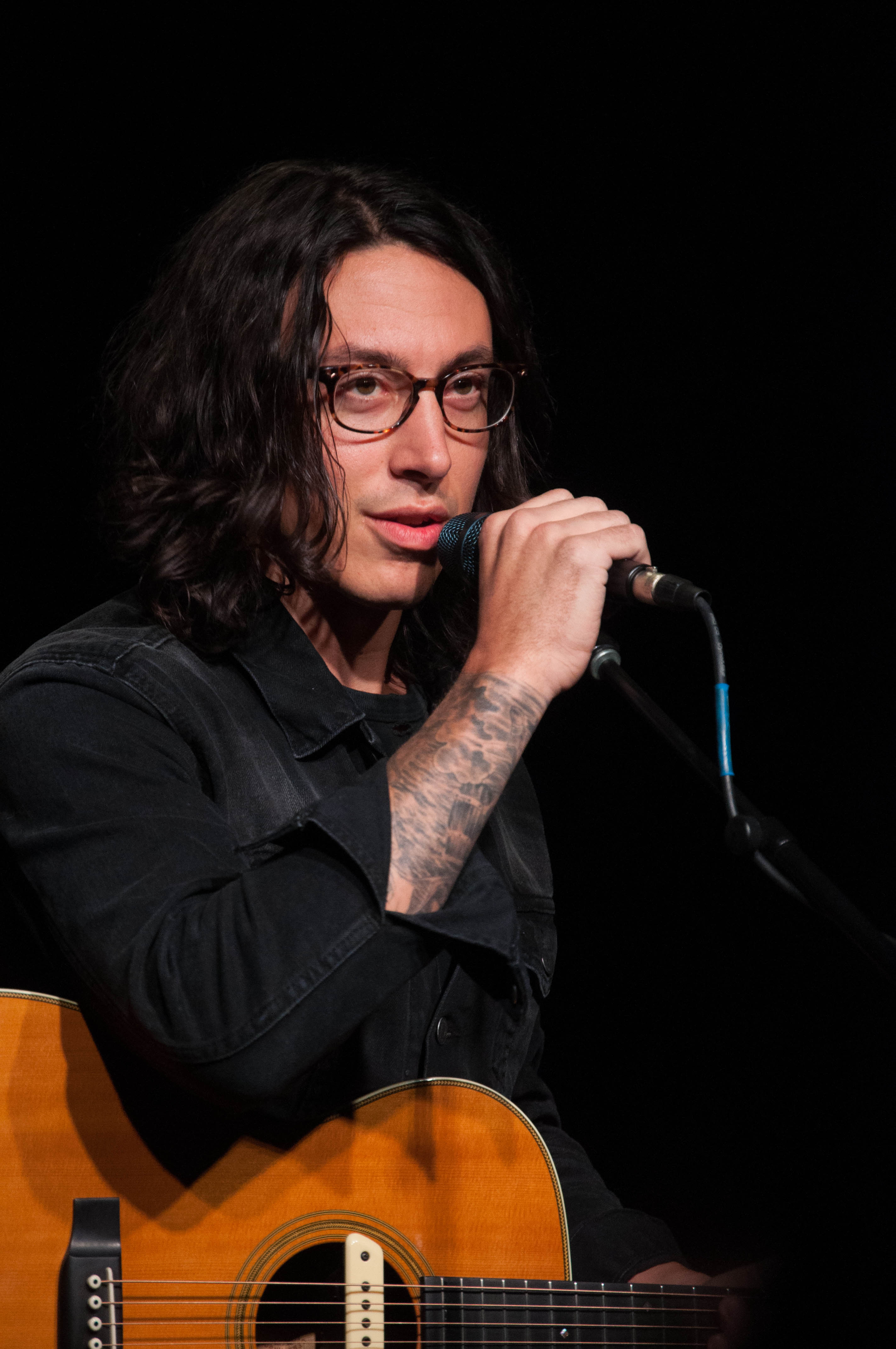
Noah Gundersen (pictured) collaborated with Bridgers on three songs.

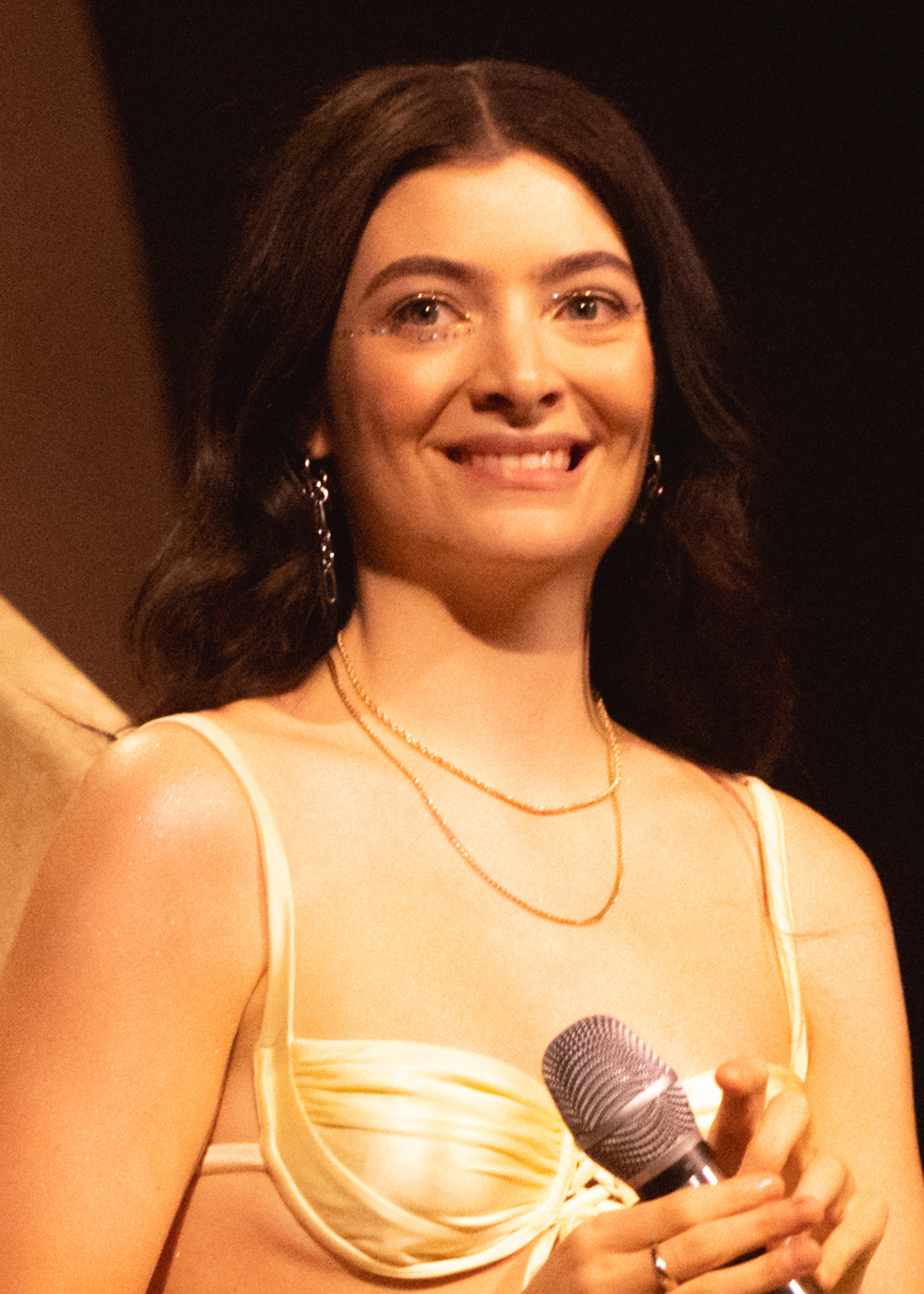
Bridgers provided background vocals on six tracks of Lorde's (pictured) third studio album, Solar Power (2021).

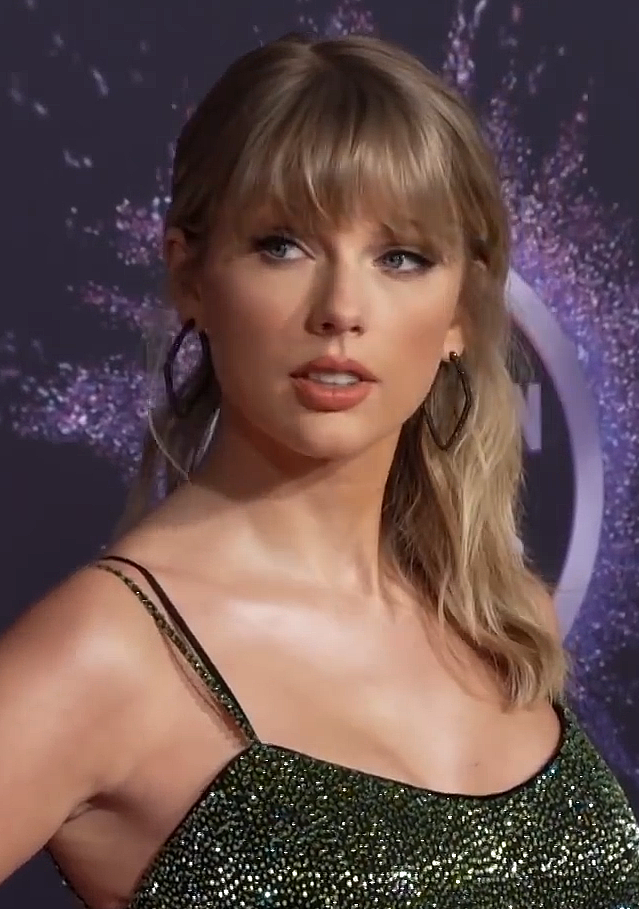
Taylor Swift (pictured) collaborated with Bridgers on "Nothing New" of her re-recorded album, Red (Taylor's Version) (2021).

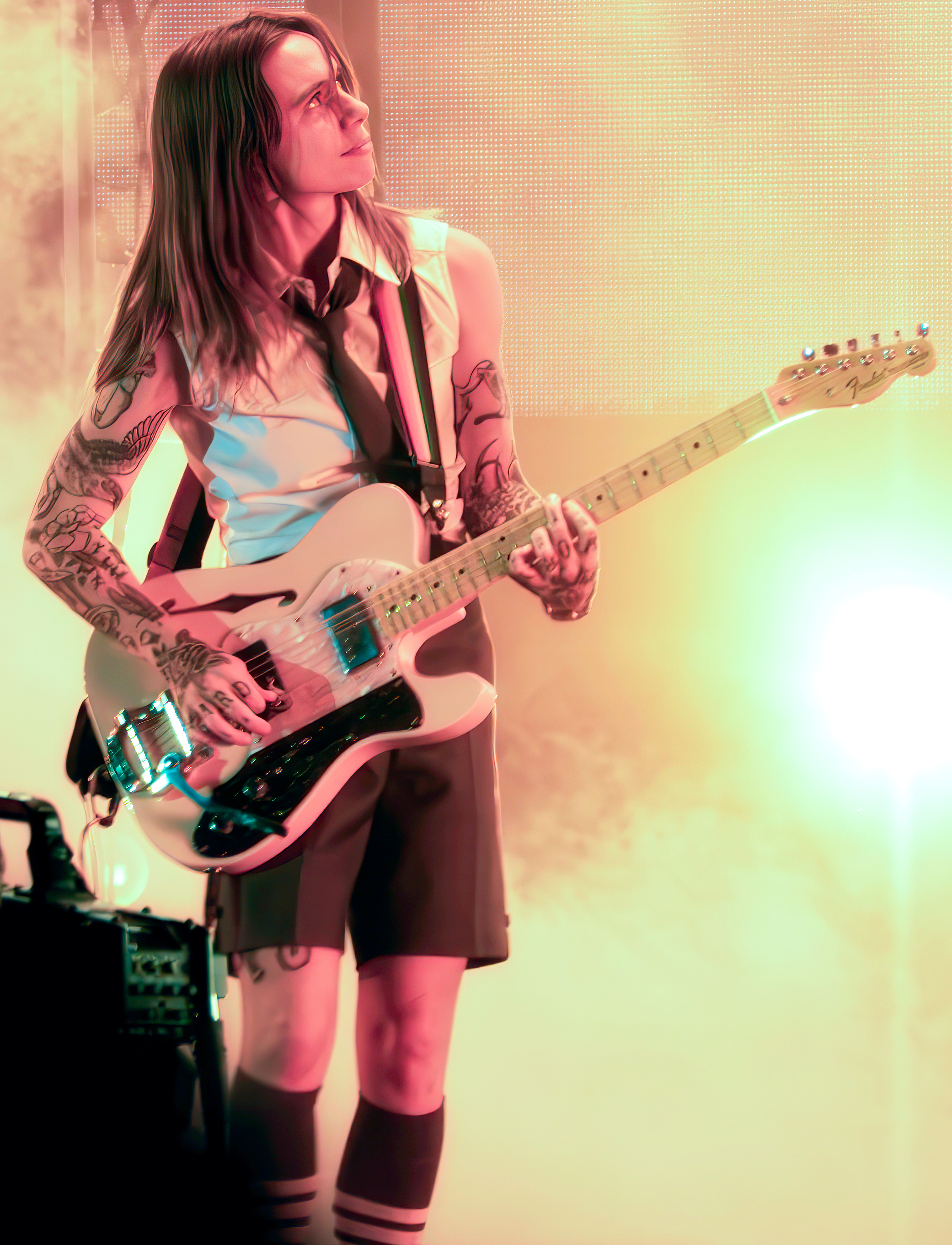
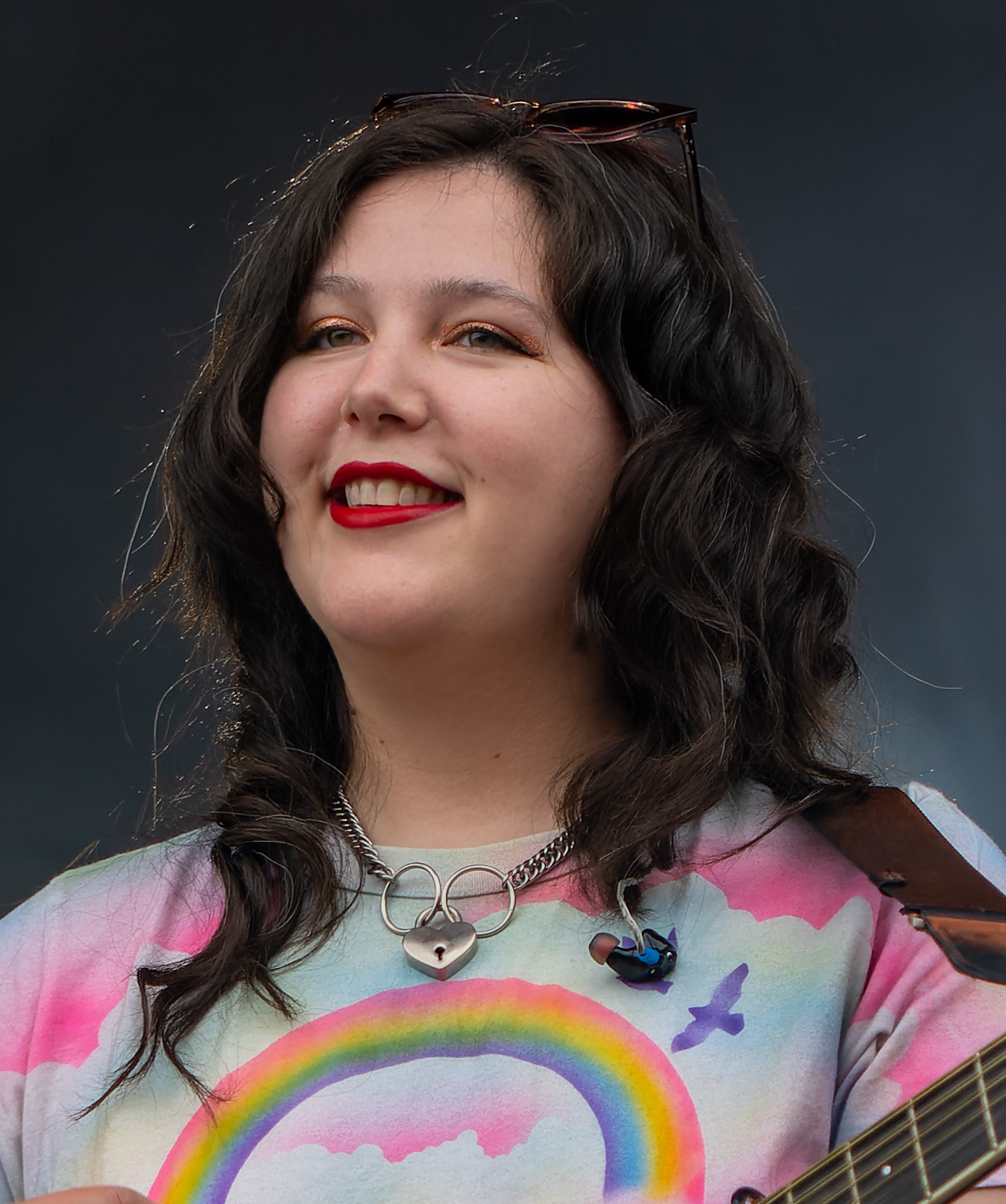
Bridgers formed supergroup Boygenius with Julien Baker (top) and Lucy Dacus. The three provided background vocals on their respective albums, Punisher (2020), Little Oblivions (2021), and Home Video (2021).

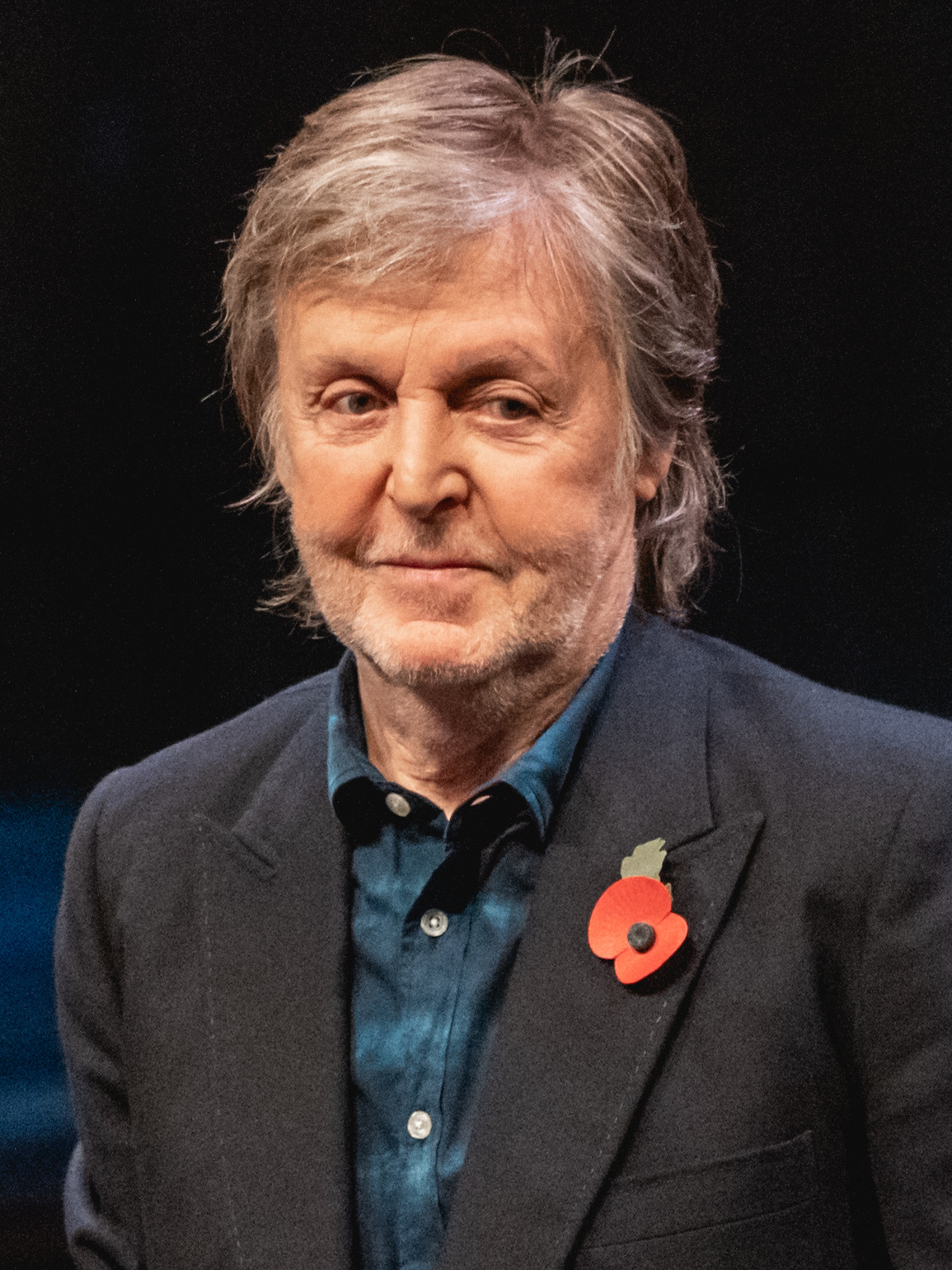
Paul McCartney (pictured) collaborated with Bridgers on "Seize the Day" of his remix album McCartney III Imagined (2021).

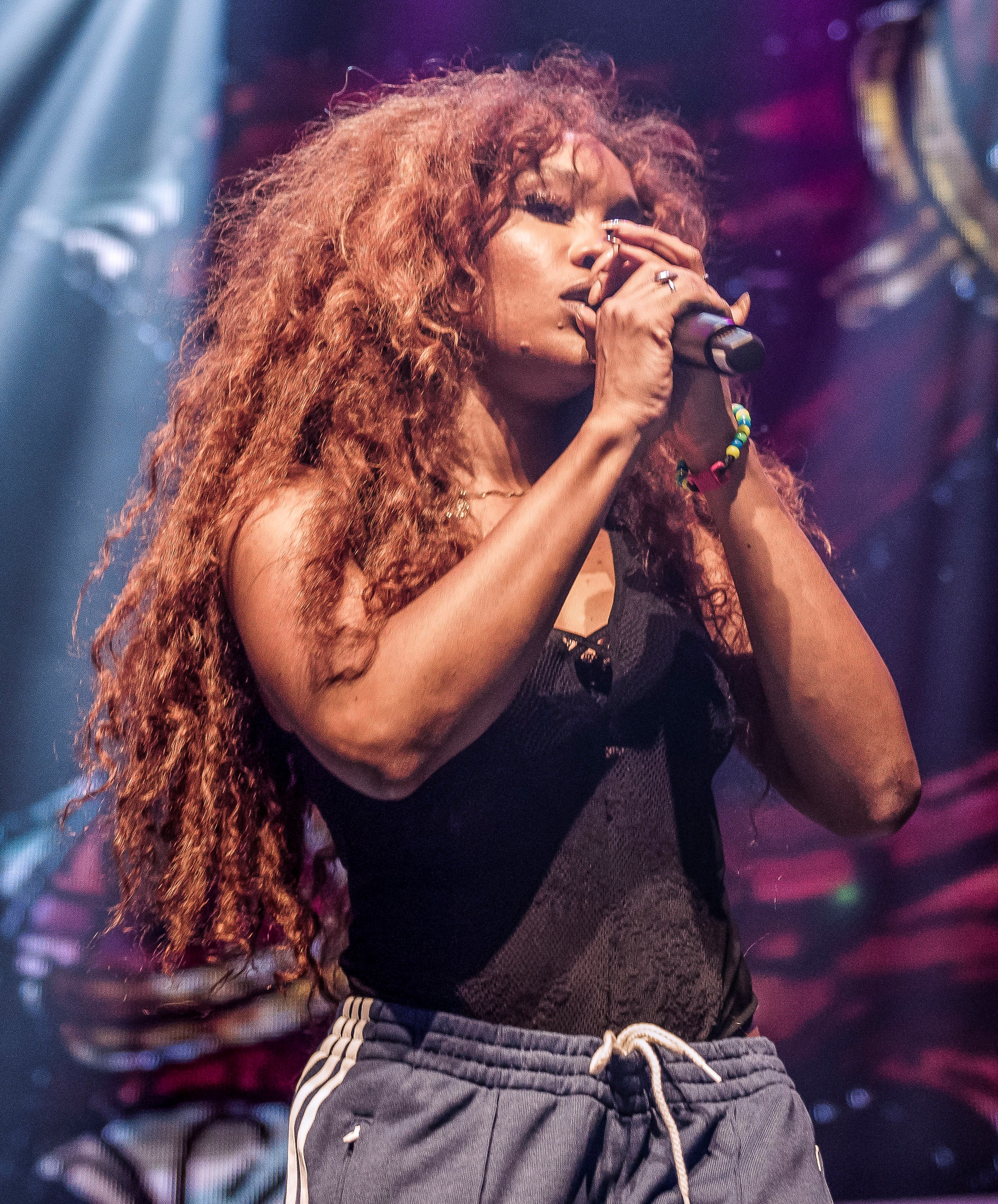
SZA (pictured) collaborated with Bridgers on "Ghost in the Machine" of her sophomore studio album, SOS (2022).

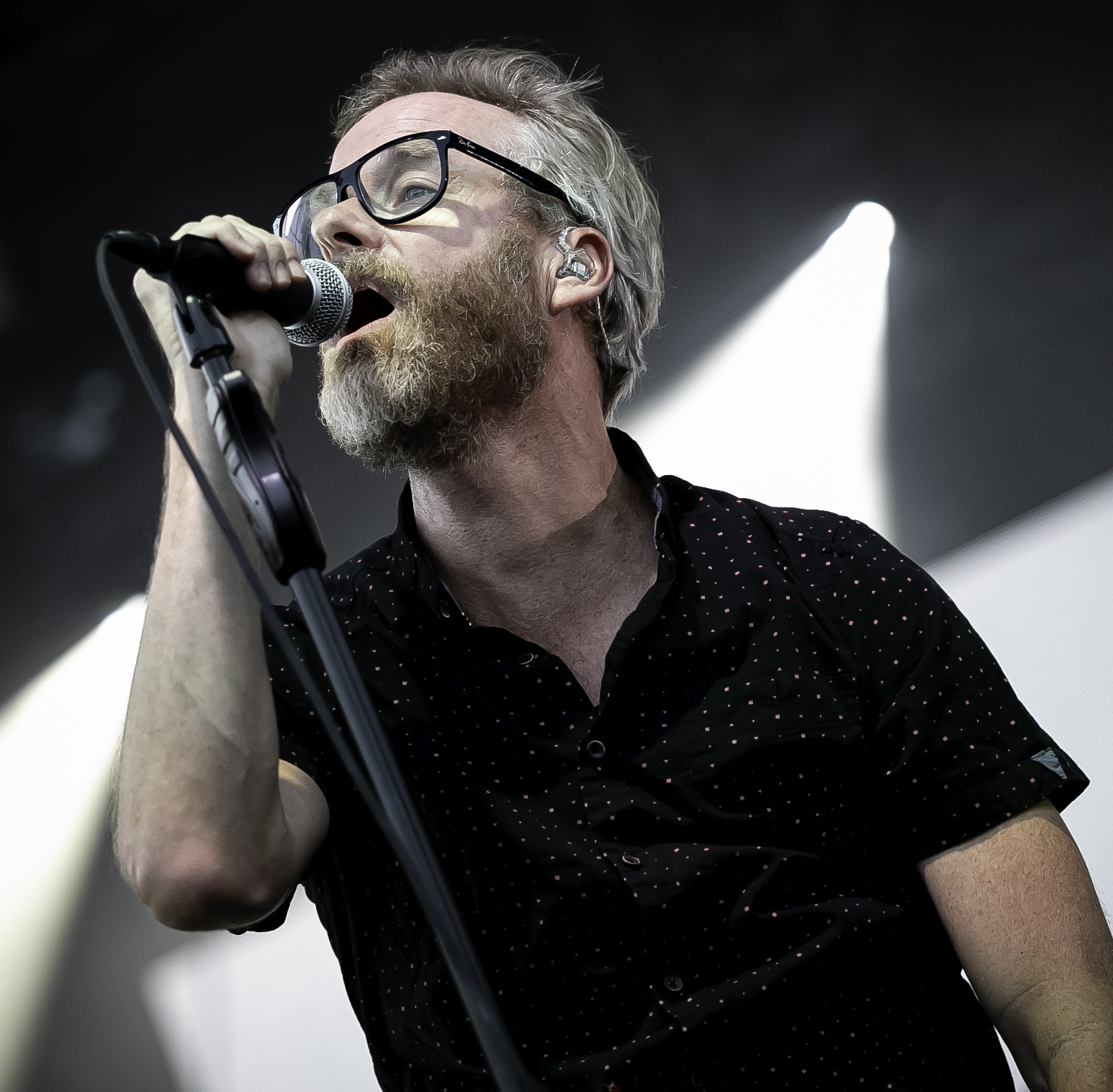
The National (vocalist Matt Berninger pictured) collaborated with Bridgers on two songs on their album First Two Pages of Frankenstein (2023).

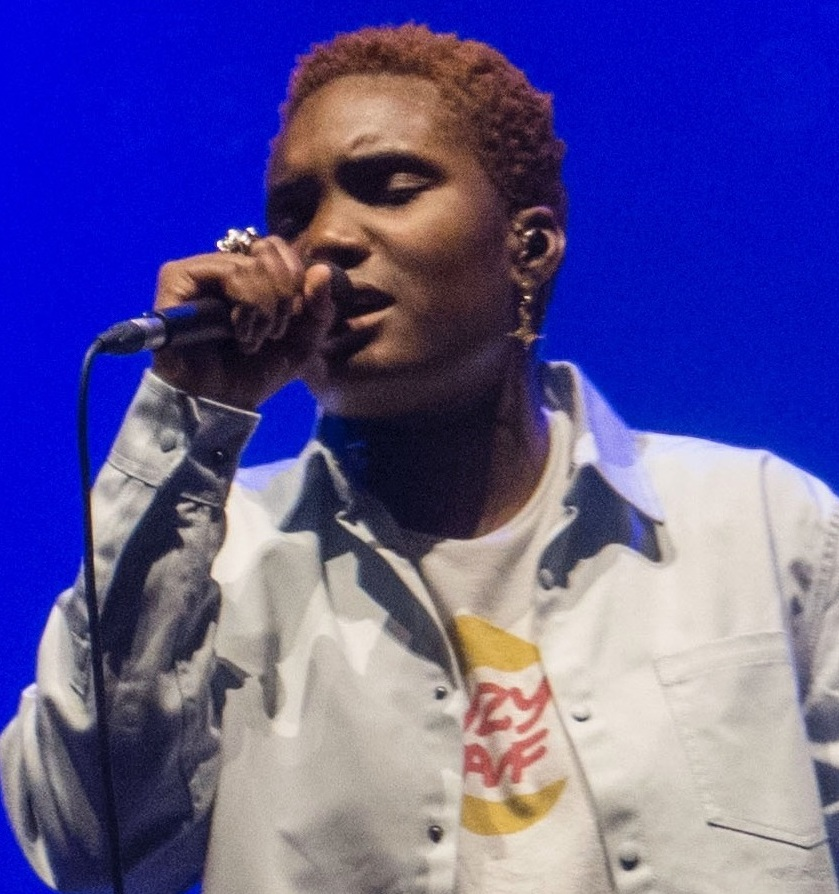
Arlo Parks (pictured) collaborated with Bridgers on "Pegasus" of her album My Soft Machine (2023).

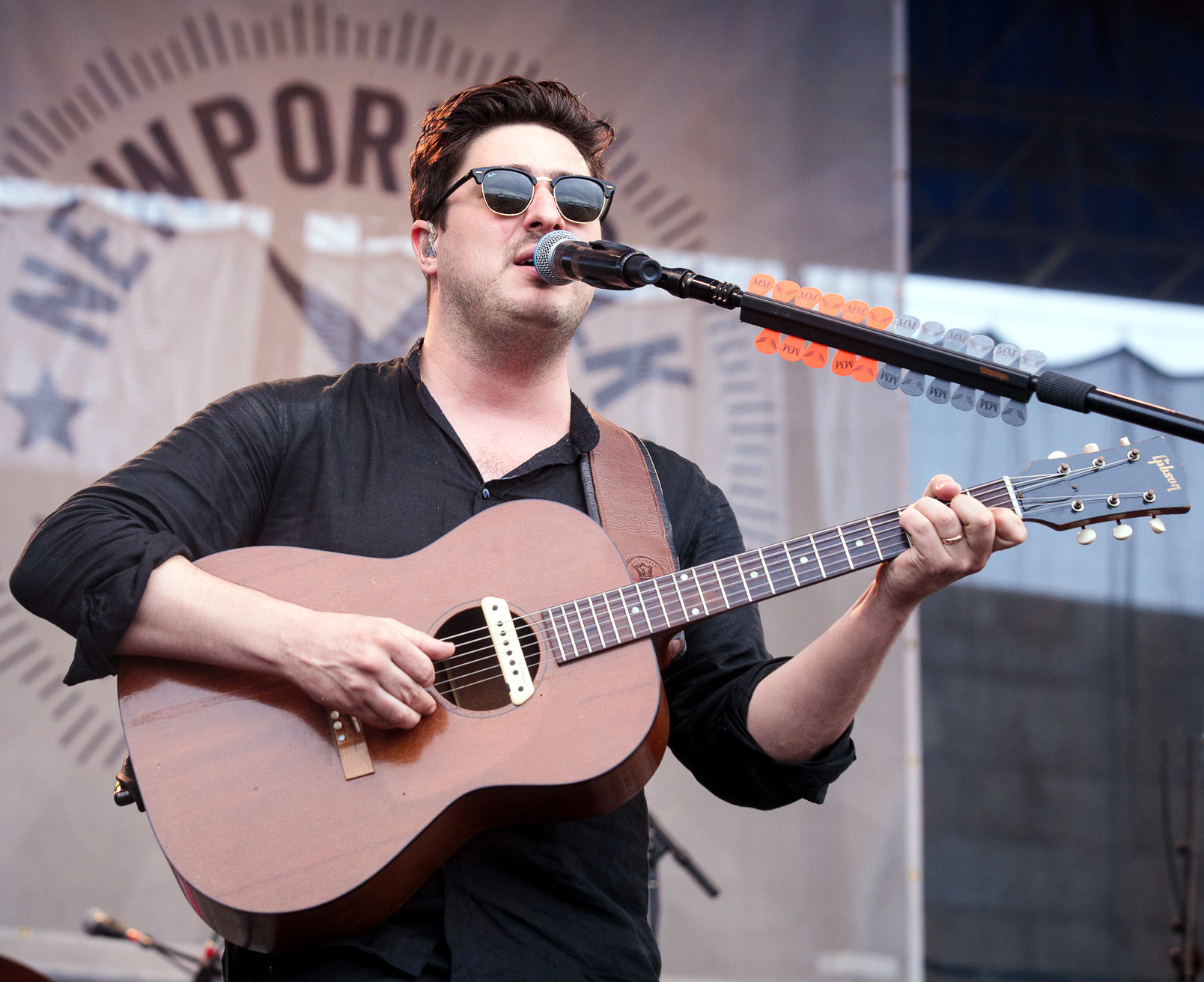
Marcus Mumford (pictured) collaborated with Bridgers on "Stonecatcher" of his debut solo studio album Self-Titled (2023).

Key
‡	Indicates song written solely by Phoebe Bridgers
†	Indicates songs feature guest vocals or background vocals by Phoebe Bridgers

Song	Artist(s)	Writer(s)	Album(s)	Year	Ref.
"$20"	Boygenius	Julien Baker; Phoebe Bridgers; Lucy Dacus	The Record	2023	
"7 O'Clock News/Silent Night" (Cover)	Phoebe Bridgers featuring Fiona Apple and Matt Berninger	Franz Xaver Gruber; Joseph Mohr	If We Make It Through December	2020	
"A Scale, A Mirror, and Those Indifferent Clocks" (Companion Version) †	Bright Eyes	Conor Oberst	Fevers And Mirrors: A Companion	2022	
"A Spindle, a Darkness, a Fever, and a Necklace" (Companion Version) †	Bright Eyes	Conor Oberst	Fevers And Mirrors: A Companion	2022	
"Adderall (End of the Line)" †	shame	Charlie Forbes; Charlie Steen; Josh Finerty; Sean Coyle-Smith; Eddie Green	Food for Worms	2023	
"Afraid of Heights"	Boygenius	Julien Baker; Phoebe Bridgers; Lucy Dacus	The Rest	2023	
"Angriest Girl"	Sloppy Jane	Haley Dahl	Totally Limbless	2014	
"Anti-Curse"	Boygenius	Julien Baker; Phoebe Bridgers; Lucy Dacus	The Record	2023	
"As Tears Go By" † (Cover)	Noah Gundersen and The Forest Rangers	Mick Jagger; Keith Richards; Andrew Loog Oldham	Sons of Anarchy: Songs of Anarchy Vol. 3	2013	
"Atlantis"	Noah Gundersen featuring Phoebe Bridgers	Noah Gundersen	A Pillar of Salt	2021	
"Aunt Rosie's Garden"	Sloppy Jane	Haley Dahl	Sure-Tuff	2015	
"Ballad of Jane"	Sloppy Jane	Haley Dahl	Sure-Tuff	2015	
"Big Black Heart"	Better Oblivion Community Center	Phoebe Bridgers; Conor Oberst; Adam McIlwee; Ben Walsh	Better Oblivion Community Center	2019	
"Bite the Hand"	Boygenius	Julien Baker; Phoebe Bridgers; Lucy Dacus	Boygenius	2018	
"Black Hole"	Boygenius	Julien Baker; Phoebe Bridgers; Lucy Dacus	The Rest	2023	
"Chelsea"	Phoebe Bridgers	Phoebe Bridgers ‡	Killer; Stranger in the Alps	2014 and 2017	
"Chesapeake"	Better Oblivion Community Center	Phoebe Bridgers; Conor Oberst; Christian Lee Hutson	Better Oblivion Community Center	2019	
"Chinese Satellite"	Phoebe Bridgers	Phoebe Bridgers; Conor Oberst; Marshall Vore	Punisher	2020	
"Christmas Song" (Cover)	Phoebe Bridgers	Dan McCarthy	If We Make It Through December	2020	
"Claw Machine"	Sloppy Jane featuring Phoebe Bridgers	Haley Dahl; Phoebe Bridgers	I Saw the TV Glow (Original Soundtrack)	2024	
"Cool About It"	Boygenius	Julien Baker; Phoebe Bridgers; Lucy Dacus	The Record	2023	
"Day After Tomorrow" (Cover)	Phoebe Bridgers	Tom Waits; Kathleen Brennan	Non-album single	2021	
"Daylight"	Zander Hawley featuring Phoebe Bridgers	Zander Hawley	I Wish I Was	2015	
"Demi Moore"	Phoebe Bridgers	Phoebe Bridgers; Marshall Vore; Harrison Whitford	Stranger in the Alps	2017	
"Didn't Know What I Was in For"	Better Oblivion Community Center	Phoebe Bridgers; Conor Oberst	Better Oblivion Community Center	2019	
"Do You Really Want to Not Get Better?" †	Joyce Manor	Joyce Manor	Cody	2016	
"Dominos" (Cover)	Better Oblivion Community Center	Taylor Hollingsworth	Better Oblivion Community Center	2019	
"DVD Menu"	Phoebe Bridgers	Phoebe Bridgers ‡	Punisher	2020	
"Dylan Thomas"	Better Oblivion Community Center	Phoebe Bridgers; Conor Oberst	Better Oblivion Community Center	2019	
"Emily I'm Sorry"	Boygenius	Julien Baker; Phoebe Bridgers; Lucy Dacus	The Record	2023	
"Enough for Now"	Ethan Gruska featuring Phoebe Bridgers	Ethan Gruska; Tony Berg; Lia Avraham; Josh Epstein; Jim Fairchild	En Garde	2020	
"Exception to the Rule"	Better Oblivion Community Center	Phoebe Bridgers; Conor Oberst	Better Oblivion Community Center	2019	
"Fallen Fruit" †	Lorde	Ella Yelich-O'Connor; Jack Antonoff	Solar Power	2021	
"Favor" †	Julien Baker	Julien Baker	Little Oblivions	2021	
"First Day of My Life" (Cover)	Phoebe Bridgers	Conor Oberst	Deezer Home Sessions	2020	
"Forest Lawn"	Better Oblivion Community Center	Phoebe Bridgers; Conor Oberst; Christian Lee Hutson	Better Oblivion Community Center	2019	
"Friday I'm in Love" (Live cover)	Phoebe Bridgers	Perry Bamonte; Boris Williams; Simon Gallup; Robert Smith; Porl Thompson	Spotify Singles	2018	
"Funeral"	Phoebe Bridgers	Phoebe Bridgers ‡	Stranger in the Alps	2017	
"Garden Song"	Phoebe Bridgers	Phoebe Bridgers; Christian Lee Hutson; Marshall Vore	Punisher	2020	
"Georgia"	Phoebe Bridgers	Phoebe Bridgers ‡	Killer; Stranger in the Alps	2014 and 2017	
"Georgia Lee" (Cover)	Phoebe Bridgers	Tom Waits; Kathleen Brennan	Come On Up to the House: Women Sing Waits	2019	
"Get the Old Band Back Together" †	Christian Lee Hutson	Christian Lee Hutson	Beginners	2020	
"Ghost in the Machine"	SZA featuring Phoebe Bridgers	Solána Rowe; Phoebe Bridgers; Rob Bisel; Carter Lang; Matt Cohn; Marshall Vore	SOS	2022	
"Glitterspit"	Sloppy Jane	Haley Dahl	Sure-Tuff	2015	
"Going Going Gone" †	Lucy Dacus	Lucy Dacus	Home Video	2021	
"The Gold" (Cover)	Phoebe Bridgers with Manchester Orchestra	Andy Hull	Non-album single	2018	
"Goodbye to Love" (Cover)	Phoebe Bridgers	Richard Carpenter; John Bettis	Minions: The Rise of Gru	2022	
"Graceland Too"	Phoebe Bridgers	Phoebe Bridgers; Christian Lee Hutson	Punisher	2020	
"Haligh, Haligh, A Lie, Haligh" (Companion Version)	Bright Eyes featuring Phoebe Bridgers	Conor Oberst	Fevers And Mirrors: A Companion	2022	
"Halloween"	Phoebe Bridgers	Phoebe Bridgers; Christian Lee Hutson; Conor Oberst	Punisher	2020	
"Have Yourself a Merry Little Christmas" (Cover)	Phoebe Bridgers	Ralph Blane; Hugh Martin	If We Make It Through December	2017 and 2020	
"I felt a Funeral, in my Brain"	Andrew Bird featuring Phoebe Bridgers	Andrew Bird; Emily Dickinson	Non-album single	2022	
"I Know the End"	Phoebe Bridgers	Phoebe Bridgers; Christian Lee Hutson; Conor Oberst; Marshall Vore	Punisher	2020	
"ICU"	Phoebe Bridgers	Phoebe Bridgers; Marshall Vore; Nicholas White	Punisher	2020	
"If We Make It Through December" (Cover)	Phoebe Bridgers	Merle Haggard	If We Make It Through December	2020	
"Iris" (Cover)	Phoebe & Maggie	John Rzeznik	Non-album single	2020	
"It'll All Work Out" (cover)	Phoebe Bridgers	Tom Petty	Stranger in the Alps	2017	
"Jesseye' Lisabeth" (Cover)	Mercury Rev featuring Phoebe Bridgers	Bobbie Gentry	Bobbie Gentry's The Delta Sweete Revisited	2019	
"Jesus Christ 2005 God Bless America" †	The 1975	Matthew Healy; George Daniel; Adam Hann; Ross MacDonald	Notes on a Conditional Form	2020	
"Ketchum, ID"	Boygenius	Julien Baker; Phoebe Bridgers; Lucy Dacus; Christian Lee Hutson	Boygenius	2018	
"Killer"	Phoebe Bridgers	Phoebe Bridgers ‡	Killer; Stranger in the Alps	2014 and 2017	
"Killer + The Sound" (Live cover)	Phoebe Bridgers and Noah and Abby Gundersen	Phoebe Bridgers; Noah Gundersen	Non-album single	2018	
"King of Sludge Mountain"	Sloppy Jane	Haley Dahl	Sure-Tuff	2015	
"Kyoto"	Phoebe Bridgers	Phoebe Bridgers; Morgan Nagler; Marshall Vore	Punisher	2020	
"Laugh Track"	The National featuring Phoebe Bridgers	Matt Berninger; Aaron Dessner	Laugh Track	2023	
"LAX" †	Conor Oberst	Conor Oberst	Amazon Music's Produced By	2018	
"Leader of a New Regime" †	Lorde	Ella Yelich-O'Connor; James Ryan Ho	Solar Power	2021	
"Lost Boys"	Phoebe Bridgers	Phoebe Bridgers; Christian Lee Hutson; Marshall Vore; Bo Burnham; Alex G	Lost Weekend	2026	
"Leonard Cohen"	Boygenius	Julien Baker; Phoebe Bridgers; Lucy Dacus; HoJun Yu; Leonard Cohen	The Record	2023	
"Letter to an Old Poet"	Boygenius	Julien Baker; Phoebe Bridgers; Lucy Dacus	The Record	2023	
"Little Trouble"	Better Oblivion Community Center	Phoebe Bridgers; Conor Oberst; Mike Mogis	Non-album single	2019	
"Lose This Number" †	Christian Lee Hutson	Christian Lee Hutson	Beginners	2020	
"Lovin' Me"	Kid Cudi featuring Phoebe Bridgers	Scott Mescudi; Phoebe Bridgers; Ryan Vojtesak; Oladipo Omishore; William Sullivan; Rami Eadeh	Man on the Moon III: The Chosen	2020	
"Me & My Dog"	Boygenius	Julien Baker; Phoebe Bridgers; Lucy Dacus	Boygenius	2018	
"Miracle of Life"	Bright Eyes featuring Phoebe Bridgers	Conor Oberst	Non-album single	2020	
"Mood Ring" †	Lorde	Ella Yelich-O'Connor; Jack Antonoff	Solar Power	2021	
"Moon Song"	Phoebe Bridgers	Phoebe Bridgers ‡	Punisher	2020	
"Motion Sickness"	Phoebe Bridgers	Phoebe Bridgers; Marshall Vore	Stranger in the Alps	2017	
"Mountain Crystals"	Luminous Kid featuring Phoebe Bridgers	Olof Grind	at the end of the dream	2021	
"My City"	Better Oblivion Community Center	Phoebe Bridgers; Conor Oberst	Better Oblivion Community Center	2019	
"The Night We Met"	Lord Huron featuring Phoebe Bridgers	Ben Schneider	13 Reasons Why: Season 2 (A Netflix Original Series Soundtrack)	2018	
"Not Strong Enough"	Boygenius	Julien Baker; Phoebe Bridgers; Lucy Dacus	The Record	2023	
"Nothing Else Matters" (Cover)	Phoebe Bridgers	James Hetfield; Lars Ulrich	The Metallica Blacklist	2021	
"Nothing New"(Taylor's Version) (from the Vault)	Taylor Swift featuring Phoebe Bridgers	Taylor Swift	Red (Taylor's Version)	2021	
"On Video"	Phoebe Bridgers	Christian Lee Hutson Jack Antonoff Phoebe Bridgers	Primetime Original Soundtrack	2026	
"The Path" †	Lorde	Ella Yelich-O'Connor	Solar Power	2021	
"Pegasus"	Arlo Parks featuring Phoebe Bridgers	Anaïs Marinho; Baird; Paul Epworth; Romil Hemnani	My Soft Machine	2023	
"Pieces"	Sloppy Jane	Haley Dahl	Totally Limbless; Burger Radio	2014	
"Playing on My Mind" †	The 1975	Matthew Healy; George Daniel; Adam Hann; Ross MacDonald	Notes on a Conditional Form	2020	
"Please Stay" †	Lucy Dacus	Lucy Dacus	Home Video	2021	
"Pop Punk (Love Song)"	Sloppy Jane	Haley Dahl	Totally Limbless; Burger Radio	2014	
"Powers"	Boygenius	Julien Baker; Phoebe Bridgers; Lucy Dacus	The Rest	2023	
"Prayer"	Sloppy Jane	Haley Dahl	Burger Radio	2014	
"Prayer In Open D" (Cover)	Phoebe Bridgers	Emmylou Harris	To Emmylou	2016	
"Punisher"	Phoebe Bridgers	Phoebe Bridgers; Conor Oberst; Marshall Vore	Punisher	2020	
"Queen of Sludge Mountain"	Sloppy Jane	Haley Dahl	Burger Radio	2014	
"Revolution 0"	Boygenius	Julien Baker; Phoebe Bridgers; Lucy Dacus	The Record	2023	
"Rhonda's Revenge"	Sloppy Jane	Haley Dahl	Totally Limbless; Burger Radio	2014	
"Roadkill" †	The 1975	Matthew Healy; George Daniel; Adam Hann; Ross MacDonald	Notes on a Conditional Form	2020	
"Roses/Lotus/Violet/Iris" †	Hayley Williams	Hayley Williams; Daniel James; Taylor York	Petals for Armor	2020	
"Runaway Horses"	The Killers featuring Phoebe Bridgers	Brandon Flowers	Pressure Machine	2021	
"Salt in the Wound"	Boygenius	Julien Baker; Phoebe Bridgers; Lucy Dacus	Boygenius	2018	
"Satanist"	Boygenius	Julien Baker; Phoebe Bridgers; Lucy Dacus	The Record	2023	
"Savior Complex"	Phoebe Bridgers	Phoebe Bridgers; Christian Lee Hutson; Conor Oberst	Punisher	2020	
"Scott Street"	Phoebe Bridgers	Phoebe Bridgers; Marshall Vore	Stranger in the Alps	2017	
"Scratch 'N' Sniff"	Sloppy Jane	Haley Dahl	Sure-Tuff	2015	
"Seize the Day"	Paul McCartney featuring Phoebe Bridgers	Paul McCartney	McCartney III Imagined	2021	
"Service Road"	Better Oblivion Community Center	Phoebe Bridgers; Conor Oberst	Better Oblivion Community Center	2019	
"Shame"	Storefront Church featuring Phoebe Bridgers	Lukas Frank; Phoebe Bridgers	Non-album single	2017	
"Sidelines"	Phoebe Bridgers	Phoebe Bridgers; Marshall Vore; Ruby Henley	Non-album single	2022	
"Silk Chiffon"	Muna featuring Phoebe Bridgers	Katie Gavin; Josette Maskin; Naomi McPherson; Ian Fitchuk; Daniel Tashian	Muna	2022	
"Single for the Summer" †	Christian Lee Hutson	Christian Lee Hutson	Beginners	2020	
"Sleepwalkin'"	Better Oblivion Community Center	Phoebe Bridgers; Conor Oberst	Better Oblivion Community Center	2019	
"Smoke Signals"	Phoebe Bridgers	Phoebe Bridgers; Marshall Vore	Stranger in the Alps	2017	
"Smoke Signals (Reprise)"	Phoebe Bridgers	Phoebe Bridgers; Marshall Vore	Stranger in the Alps	2017	
"So Much Wine" (Cover)	Phoebe Bridgers	Brett Sparks; Rennie Sparks	Non-album single	2022	
"Solar Power" †	Lorde	Ella Yelich-O'Connor; Jack Antonoff	Solar Power	2021	
"Sometimes"	Scruffpuppie featuring Phoebe Bridgers	Jodi Shurbet	letters to nobody	2021	
"Souvenir"	Boygenius	Julien Baker; Phoebe Bridgers; Lucy Dacus	Boygenius	2018	
"St. Ides Heaven" (Companion Version) (Cover)	Bright Eyes featuring Phoebe Bridgers	Elliott Smith	Letting Off the Happiness: A Companion	2022	
"Stay Down"	Boygenius	Julien Baker; Phoebe Bridgers; Lucy Dacus	Boygenius	2018	
"Steamroller"	Phoebe Bridgers	Phoebe Bridgers ‡	Killer	2015	
"Stonecatcher"	Marcus Mumford featuring Phoebe Bridgers	Marcus Mumford; Blake Mills	Self-Titled	2022	
"Stoned at the Nail Salon" †	Lorde	Ella Yelich-O'Connor; Jack Antonoff	Solar Power	2021	
"Summer's End" (Cover)	Phoebe Bridgers featuring Maria Taylor	John Prine; Pat McLaughlin	Spotify Singles	2021	
"Symposium Message"	Better Oblivion Community Center	Conor Oberst; Phoebe Bridgers; Christian Lee Hutson	Non-album single	2019	
"That Funny Feeling" (Cover)	Phoebe Bridgers	Bo Burnham	Non-album single	2021	
"Then Because She Goes" †	The 1975	Matthew Healy; George Daniel; Adam Hann; Ross MacDonald	Notes on a Conditional Form	2020	
"They're Coming to Take Me Away--Ha Ha!" (cover)	Sloppy Jane	Haley Dahl; Jerry Samuels	Sure-Tuff	2015	
"This Isn't Helping"	The National featuring Phoebe Bridgers	Matt Berninger; Aaron Dessner	First Two Pages of Frankenstein	2023	
"True Blue"	Boygenius	Julien Baker; Phoebe Bridgers; Lucy Dacus	The Record	2023	
"Turned Around"	Phoebe Bridgers	Phoebe Bridgers ‡	Killer	2014	
"Unforgivable" †	Christian Lee Hutson	Christian Lee Hutson	Beginners	2020	
"Until We Both Get Bored"	Zander Hawley featuring Phoebe Bridgers	Zander Hawley	When I Get Blue	2017	
"Voyager"	Boygenius	Julien Baker; Phoebe Bridgers; Lucy Dacus	The Rest	2023	
"Waiting Room"	Phoebe Bridgers	Phoebe Bridgers ‡	Lost Ark Studio Compilation - Vol. 08	2014 and 2023	
"Walking on a String"	Matt Berninger featuring Phoebe Bridgers	Matt Berninger; Carin Besser; Mike Brewer	Non-album single	2019	
"Wasted"	Rob Moose featuring Phoebe Bridgers	Marshall Vore	Inflorescence	2023	
"We're in Love"	Boygenius	Julien Baker; Phoebe Bridgers; Lucy Dacus	The Record	2023	
"Whatever"	Phoebe Bridgers	Phoebe Bridgers ‡	Killer	2014	
"When the Curious Girl Realizes She Is Under Glass" (Companion Version) †	Bright Eyes	Conor Oberst	Fevers And Mirrors: A Companion	2022	
"The Whole of the Moon" † (Cover)	Fiona Apple	Mike Scott	Non-album single	2021	
"Wilt" (Note: Sloppy Jane released a version featuring vocals by Bridgers for a double single My Misery Will Bury You in 2022.)	Sloppy Jane	Haley Dahl	Totally Limbless; Burger Radio	2014	
"Wish Me Well"	Sloppy Jane	Haley Dahl	Totally Limbless; Burger Radio	2014	
"Without You Without Them"	Boygenius	Julien Baker; Phoebe Bridgers; Lucy Dacus	The Record	2023	
"Words" (Cover)	Storefront Church featuring Phoebe Bridgers	Alan Sparhawk; Mimi Parker; John Nichols	Non-album single	2022	
"Would You Rather"	Phoebe Bridgers	Phoebe Bridgers; Marshall Vore; Tony Berg	Stranger in the Alps	2017	
"You Missed My Heart" (cover)	Phoebe Bridgers	Mark Kozelek; Jimmy LaValle	Stranger in the Alps	2017	
"Your Mind Is Not Your Friend"	The National featuring Phoebe Bridgers	Matt Berninger; Aaron Dessner	First Two Pages of Frankenstein	2023	
