= Shower beer =

Trend of drinking beer in the shower

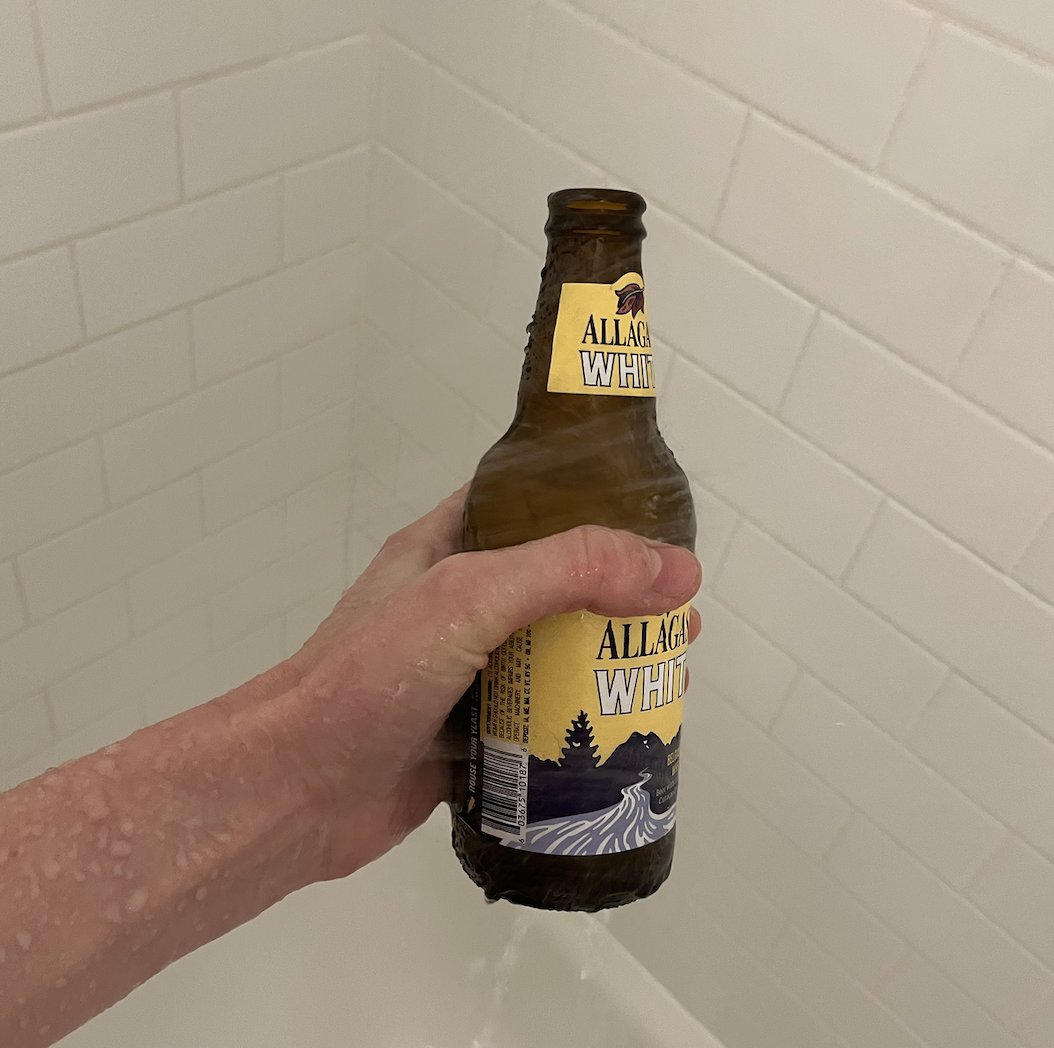
Wheat beer consumed in the shower

A shower beer is a beer consumed while taking a shower. While the concept is not complex, it did not become a cultural trend until the first decade of the 2000s.

== History ==
With easily-openable aluminum beer cans in abundance, and indoor showers common and becoming the preferred form of bathing, there is some evidence that the idea of having a "shower beer" as a purposeful act did exist by the 1980s in the United States, but no contemporary news coverage of it seems to exist. To the extent people starting drinking in the shower prior to going out (pregaming) in the mid-1980s, this is also when the national drinking age in the United States was raised to 21.

However, aside from anecdotal stories, there is no evidence that the idea of a "shower beer" started spreading as a cultural trend in the United States until the mid-2000s. The term "shower beer" first spiked in Google search results in 2006, and it has continued to grow since that time. The Urban Dictionary entry for shower beer was created in 2004. The first products sold to support drinking a beer in the shower seem to have first appeared around 2006, such as the "shower beer buddy", and numerous other products have appeared since. Breweries also market some beers specifically as good "shower beers".

A number of stories about the practice started being posted on the Internet around 2012. The r/showerbeer subreddit on Reddit was created in 2011, and had more than 100,000 subscribers as of 2019. The site features selfies of people (with varying degrees of nudity displayed) enjoying a shower beer.

One noted frequent case for having a shower beer is during "pregaming" (a term that developed in 1990s) before going out for a night on the town. The increase of the legal drinking age in the United States to 21 in the 1980s has been blamed for the popularity of pregaming, and may have promoted the development of shower beers on college campuses. However, other common occasions for having a shower beer include after a long day at work or after doing strenuous outside activity. Actress Margot Robbie shared her enjoyment of "beer showers" after a long work day in a 2016 interview.

The phenomenon was also mentioned in the song "Shower Beer" by Canadian band the Beaches, on their album Blame My Ex. US singer-songwriter Phoebe Bridgers refers to it in the lyrics of her song Scott Street, published on her record Stranger in the Alps (2017).

To avoid glass breakage, it is often recommended that a shower beer be a canned beer.
