= Pregame =

Pregame may refer to:

- Pre-game show, a television or radio presentation that occurs immediately before the live broadcast of a major sporting event
- Pregaming, the process of getting drunk prior to going out socializing
- "Pregame", an episode of the 2024 TV series Matlock
