= Cannibal (Marcus Mumford song) =

2022 song

Single by Marcus Mumford

from the album Self-Titled
- Released: 14 July 2022
- Genre: Folk rock
- Length: 4:01
- Label: Capitol
- Songwriter: Marcus Mumford
- Producer: Blake Mills

Marcus Mumford singles chronology
"Lay Your Head on Me" (2020)	"Cannibal" (2022)	"Grace" (2022)

Music video
- Cannibal on YouTube

"Cannibal" is the debut solo single by Mumford & Sons frontman Marcus Mumford, released on 14 July 2022 by Capitol Records. It is the lead single from his solo debut album Self-Titled, and was produced by Blake Mills.

== Style and reception ==
Per Consequence's Abby Jones, the song is "a somber, rootsy tune that feels a bit like a pared-down version of Mumford & Sons' arena-sized folk rock—that is, until around the three-minute mark, when the song transforms from an acoustic ballad into a rousing barnburner", and has lyrics which "sees Mumford break away from a parasitic relationship" with lyrics including "You took the first slice of me and you ate it raw/ Ripped at it with your teeth and your lips like a cannibal/ You fucking animal" in the first verse and "Help me know how to begin again" in the song's climax. DIY's Emma Swann notes "Cannibal" as one of the songs on the album where Mumford "strips it right back", bringing out "a warm quality to his songwriting that seeps through." The Independent's Helen Brown notes a moment where the song's "suppressed, acoustic intensity ... explodes into a synth-backed crescendo", with "Mumford's big yearning yawp of a voice ... buried behind the instrumentation", "as though he's handing over the experience." Brown calls it an effective technique and "evocative of the hushed circle of chairs at a support group." NME's Elizabeth Aubrey emphasises the song's "downcast fingerpicking", calling it "sonically sparse".

In an interview with GQ's Zach Baron, Mumford confessed the lyrics were about his experience being sexually abused as a child, with the song containing lyrics explicitly about the matter such as the lines "I can still taste you and I hate it" and "That wasn't a choice in the mind of a child and you knew it".

== Music video ==
A music video for the song was released 18 July 2022, directed by first-time music video director Steven Spielberg. The video was shot in a high school gym in New York and filmed in one take entirely on Spielberg's phone. The crew also included Spielberg's wife Kate Capshaw as producer, art director and dolly grip; Mumford's wife Carey Mulligan as costumer and sound engineer; and Kristie Macosko Krieger as co-producer and behind-the-scenes videographer.

== Personnel ==
- Marcus Mumford – vocals, acoustic guitar, electric guitar, drums, songwriting
- Blake Mills – producer, acoustic guitar, electric guitar, drums, percussion, organ, synthesiser, mixing engineer
- Jim Keltner – cymbals
- Joseph Lorge – recording and mixing engineer
- Patricia Sullivan – mastering engineer
- Danielle Goldsmith, Gabe Lowry, Logan Taylor, and Scott Moore – assistant recording engineers
