= Grace (Marcus Mumford song) =

2022 song

Single by Marcus Mumford

from the album Self-Titled
- Released: 29 July 2022
- Genre: Folk rock
- Length: 4:14
- Songwriter(s): Marcus Mumford, Blake Mills
- Producer(s): Blake Mills

Marcus Mumford singles chronology
"Cannibal" (2022)	"Grace" (2022)	"Better Off High" (2022)

Music video
- Grace on YouTube

"Grace" is a song by Mumford & Sons frontman Marcus Mumford, released as the second single from his solo debut album Self-Titled on 29 July 2022. The song features vocalist Danielle Ponder and bassist Pino Paladino, and was co-written by Mumford and producer Blake Mills.

== Style and reception ==
Mxdwn.com's Alexandra Kozicki called the song "quite soulful, with Mumford's gravelly voice accompanied by [Danielle] Ponder's backing vocals" with production which is "softer than what Mumford and Sons are known for, employing light percussion and acoustic instruments", though the songwriting is "at its finest ... in the form of him clearly expressing some catharsis and the deep tension in his voice during the chorus. There is a lot of pain in this song, but also some hope and, as the title suggests, grace." NME's Tom Skinner called the song "rough-and-ready" and "country-tinged". Our Culture Mag's Gerda Krivaite described "Grace" as being "infused with a comforting folk-rock vibrancy". The Arts Desk's Barney Harsent notes the track standing in contrast to lead single "Cannibal", with that song's "sparse, open spaces of its predecessor" being succeeded by one that "bursts into life like Tom Petty gatecrashing a therapy session" and is "unexpectedly and defiantly upbeat, the sound of a weight being lifted."

The Independent's Helen Brown says the song's "cradle-rocked riff evokes a hushed take on Tom Petty's "Free Fallin'", while NME's Elizabeth Aubrey says the song is "full of zippy guitars and uplifting instrumentation." Riff's Roman Gokhman notes that the "main guitar riff has more electric grit than Mumford & Sons, while a guitar solo distances it from the Americana sound for which Mumford is best known. It sounds more like Collective Soul." In a less positive review of the album, DIY's Emma Swann calls the track "a confused mess of US radio rock tropes: a blues guitar solo bulldozing its way through while Marcus adopts a Transatlantic twang for the hollow refrain of 'Grace/Like a river'". Per Mumford, the song is about a conversation he had with his mother about his having been sexually abused as a child.

== Music video ==
The single was released alongside a music video directed by Diane Martel, and features Mumford drinking several glasses of water to the point where he coughs it up and it spills all over himself. Per Kozicki, "Though the sound of the song is mellow in tempo, there is a much more soulful and active undertone to the video, which mirrors the feeling of the track."

== Live performances ==
Mumford performed the song with a live band on The Late Late Show with James Corden on October 4, 2022.

== Personnel ==
- Marcus Mumford – vocals, guitar, percussion, songwriting
- Blake Mills – producer, songwriting, guitar, harmonium, piano, percussion, synth bass, vocals, mixing engineer
- Joseph Lorge – mixing engineer, baritone guitar
- Pino Palladino – bass
- Steve Ferrone – drums
- Reuben James – organ
- Rob Moose – strings
- Danielle Ponder – vocals
- Gavin Batty – vocals
- Patricia Sullivan – mastering engineer
- Danielle Goldsmith, Gabe Lowry, Logan Taylor, and Scott Moore – assistant recording engineers
