= Funeral (Phoebe Bridgers song) =

Single by Phoebe Bridgers

from the album Stranger in the Alps
- Released: September 12, 2017
- Length: 3:52
- Label: Dead Oceans
- Songwriter: Phoebe Bridgers
- Producers: Tony Berg; Ethan Gruska

Phoebe Bridgers singles chronology
"Motion Sickness" (2017)	"Funeral" (2017)	"Shame" (2017)

Lyric video
- "Funeral" on YouTube

"Funeral" is a song by American singer-songwriter Phoebe Bridgers. The song and its lyric video were released on September 12, 2017, as the fourth and final single from her debut studio album, Stranger in the Alps, through the Dead Oceans label. The song follows a narrator describing the death of someone whose funeral she will be singing at, depicting the inescapable grief, anxiety, depression of everyday life. The track is emotional and melancholic, incorporating acoustic guitar patterns and string arrangements; Bridgers has said the song was inspired by the heroin overdose of her close friend.

== Background and composition ==
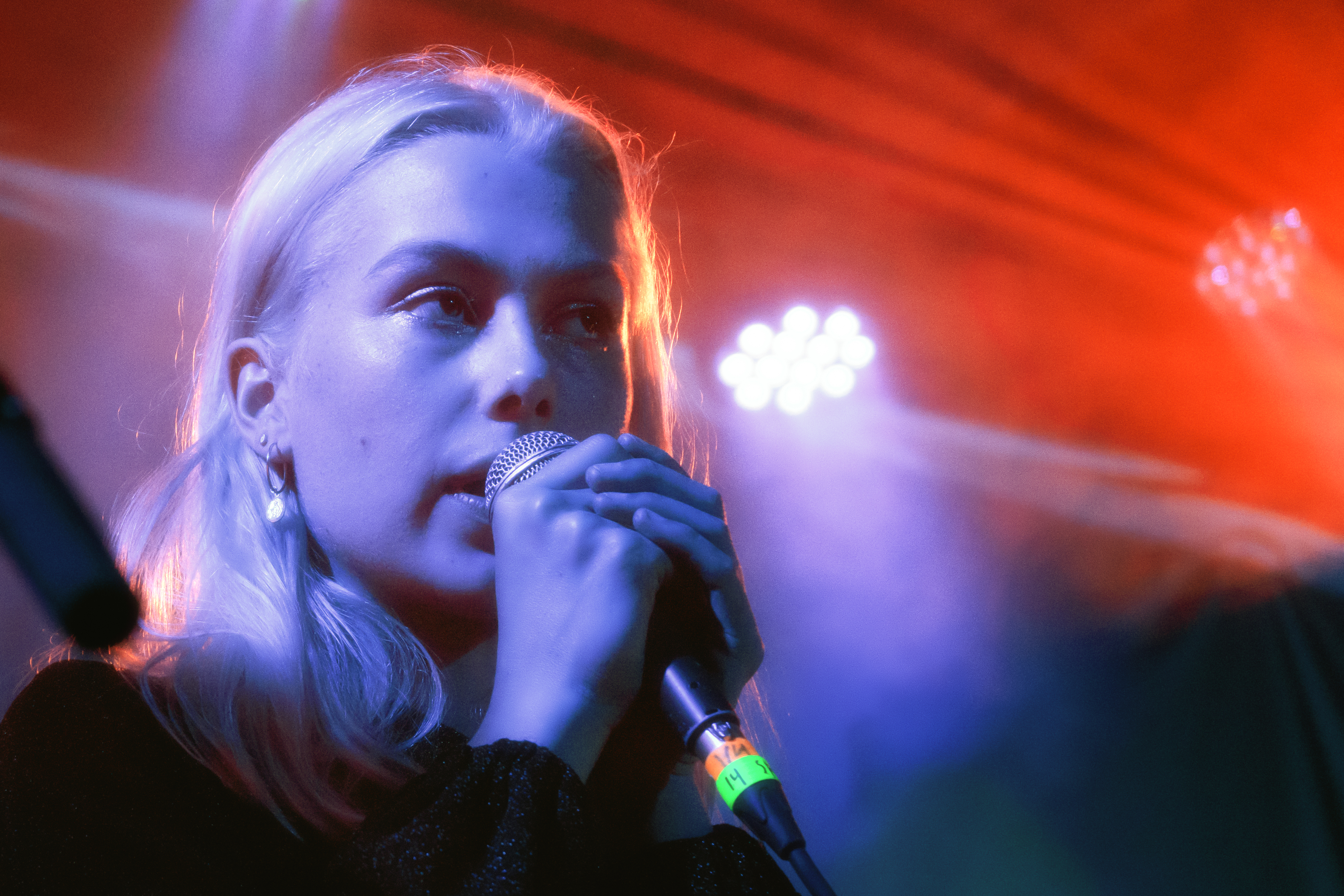
Bridgers performing in 2018.

"Funeral" is based on the funeral and death of Bridgers's close friend, who overdosed on heroin. She recalls the experience of speaking to her friend's father after his death, with the lyrics: "And I've been talking to his dad/ It makes me so sad/ When I think too much about it I can't breathe".

Bridgers illustrates her struggle with depression and her ideation of death: "And I have this dream where I'm screaming under water/ While my friends are waving from the shore". Bridgers has said that much of her music is inspired by death: "I do think about dying a lot. I feel like a lot of my friends, especially artists, are consumed with this idea of the inevitability of death". Bridgers also has spoken about how intimate and emotional "Funeral" is for her: "Every time I sing that song, I get a little bit uncomfortable because it’s so personal".

The song is a downbeat, acoustic track that begins and ends with the distortion of an electric guitar. Bridgers's gentle, feathery vocals and lamenting lyrics are accompanied by an acoustic guitar throughout, with string arrangements coming through on the chorus. The chorus's repeating lyrics—"Jesus Christ, I'm so blue all the time/ And that's just how I feel/ Always have and always will"—highlight the recurring cycle of depression.

Along with the track, the accompanying lyric video for "Funeral" was released on September 12, 2017. The video depicts Bridgers in black and white, her face only partially lit, singing the song against a black background.

== Critical reception ==
"Funeral" placed 2nd place on The Fader's list of "The 101 best songs of 2017", describing it as "brutally unabashed". Mikael Wood of the Los Angeles Times lauded "Funeral" as "a devastating portrait of depression" and called Bridgers "brilliant". The Washington Post praised the song as "haunting", writing that "the delicate, emotive lilt in [Bridgers's] soothing voice makes her brutally honest revelations enticing". The magazine Paste opined that the song was one of the "highlights" of the album and exemplified Bridgers's ability "to make this song about a stranger’s overdose into a highly relatable moment".

== Certifications ==
Certifications for "Funeral"
Region	Certification	Certified units/sales
New Zealand (RMNZ)	Gold	15,000^{‡}
United Kingdom (BPI)	Silver	200,000^{‡}
^{‡} Sales+streaming figures based on certification alone.
