= Motion Sickness (Phoebe Bridgers song) =

Single by Phoebe Bridgers

from the album Stranger in the Alps
- Released: July 18, 2017
- Genre: Alt-country; folk-pop
- Length: 3:50
- Label: Dead Oceans
- Songwriters: Phoebe Bridgers; Marshall Vore
- Producers: Tony Berg; Ethan Gruska

Phoebe Bridgers singles chronology
"Until We Both Get Bored" (2017)	"Motion Sickness" (2017)	"Funeral" (2017)

Music video
- "Motion Sickness" on YouTube

"Motion Sickness" is a song by American singer-songwriter Phoebe Bridgers. It was released on July 18, 2017 by Dead Oceans as the second single from her debut studio album, Stranger in the Alps. The song was written by Bridgers and Marshall Vore and produced by Tony Berg and Ethan Gruska. "Motion Sickness" was written about Bridgers's ex-boyfriend Ryan Adams, whom she later accused of emotional abuse, alongside several other women. In 2022, the song was certified gold in the United States (RIAA).

== Background and composition ==
"Motion Sickness" is an "Americana-tinged" alt-country and folk-pop song that has been compared to the work of Elliott Smith in its lyrical honesty. It is the most upbeat song on the album, with a "hopping pulse and singalong chorus." The song was described by Mish Barber-Way of The Fader as "the epitome of confession-meets-comedy, a big 'fuck you' delivered with a wink and a kiss."

The song’s title was inspired by the Bright Eyes song “Motion Sickness,” first released in 2006 on the Rarity Compilation Album “Noise Floor,” and by the 2005 Bright Eyes live album “Motion Sickness.” Bridgers subsequently teamed up with Bright Eyes frontman Conor Oberst in 2019 to release the album “Better Oblivion Community Center” by their band of the same name.

“Motion Sickness” was written about Bridgers' ex-boyfriend Ryan Adams, who produced her debut EP Killer and released it on his record label PAX AM. The song gained renewed attention in 2019 when Bridgers joined a chorus of women accusing Adams of abuse. Of the song's relevance to the situation, Flood magazine writer Anya Jaremko-Greenworld said "when Bridgers sings sadly on the chorus, 'There are no words in the English language / I could scream to drown you out,' she's wrong. Adams was drowned out last week by the voices of women in the music industry, harmonizing in fury and in liberation."

== Music video ==
"Motion Sickness" was accompanied by a Justin Mitchell-directed video that depicts Bridgers riding a scooter around her Los Angeles neighborhood in a tuxedo, before ending up in a karaoke bar. At one point she rides on the sidewalk past the intersection of Lucile Avenue and Hoover Street. Of the video Bridgers said, "I've had the idea for this video since before recording [the song]. Probably inspired by my brother Jackson singing "Down With the Sickness" to me in karaoke with 100% commitment in an orange jumpsuit."

== Live performances ==
Phoebe Bridgers promoted the song through various live performances. On November 27, 2017, she performed the song in her NPR Tiny Desk Concert with Ethan Gruska and Rob Moose. In the set she also performed Stranger in the Alps album tracks "Demi Moore" and "Killer" She performed the song on NME's Basement Sessions on December 7, 2017. She then played the song on KCRW on January 11, 2018, and on KEXP on July 13, 2018.

== Critical reception ==
Radio station KEXP named "Motion Sickness" their "Song of the Day", calling it "a love-hate song that chooses honesty about heartbreak as opposed to vindictive bitterness towards a past lover." Tully Claymore of Stereogum described the song as "an aching betrayal, a story of a friendship or relationship that collapsed under some unknowable pressure" In a review for the album, Ellen Peirson-Hagger of Under the Radar singled it out as a highlight, saying "Stand-out track 'Motion Sickness' hits at both the familiarity she spawns with her youthful lyrics, and her controlled and nuanced observational skill. She acknowledges her childishness, singing 'I hate you for what you did/and I miss you like a little kid,' while still rendering the ability to mock her overbearing sensitivity with 'I have emotional motion sickness/Somebody roll the windows down.'"

The song was included on NME and NPR's lists of the best songs of 2017, placing 16th and 38th respectively. Pitchfork also ranked the song as the 64th best of the 2010s.

According to Loudwire, lyrics for the track were among the most-searched in the indie rock genre according to a study that examined Google searches from January 2019 through July 2023.

== Charts ==
Chart performance for "Motion Sickness"
Chart (2018)	Peak position
US Adult Alternative Airplay (Billboard)	26

== Certifications ==
Certifications for "Motion Sickness"
Region	Certification	Certified units/sales
New Zealand (RMNZ)	Platinum	30,000^{‡}
United Kingdom (BPI)	Gold	400,000^{‡}
United States (RIAA)	Gold	500,000^{‡}
^{‡} Sales+streaming figures based on certification alone.
