= Marcus Mumford =

British musician and singer (born 1987)

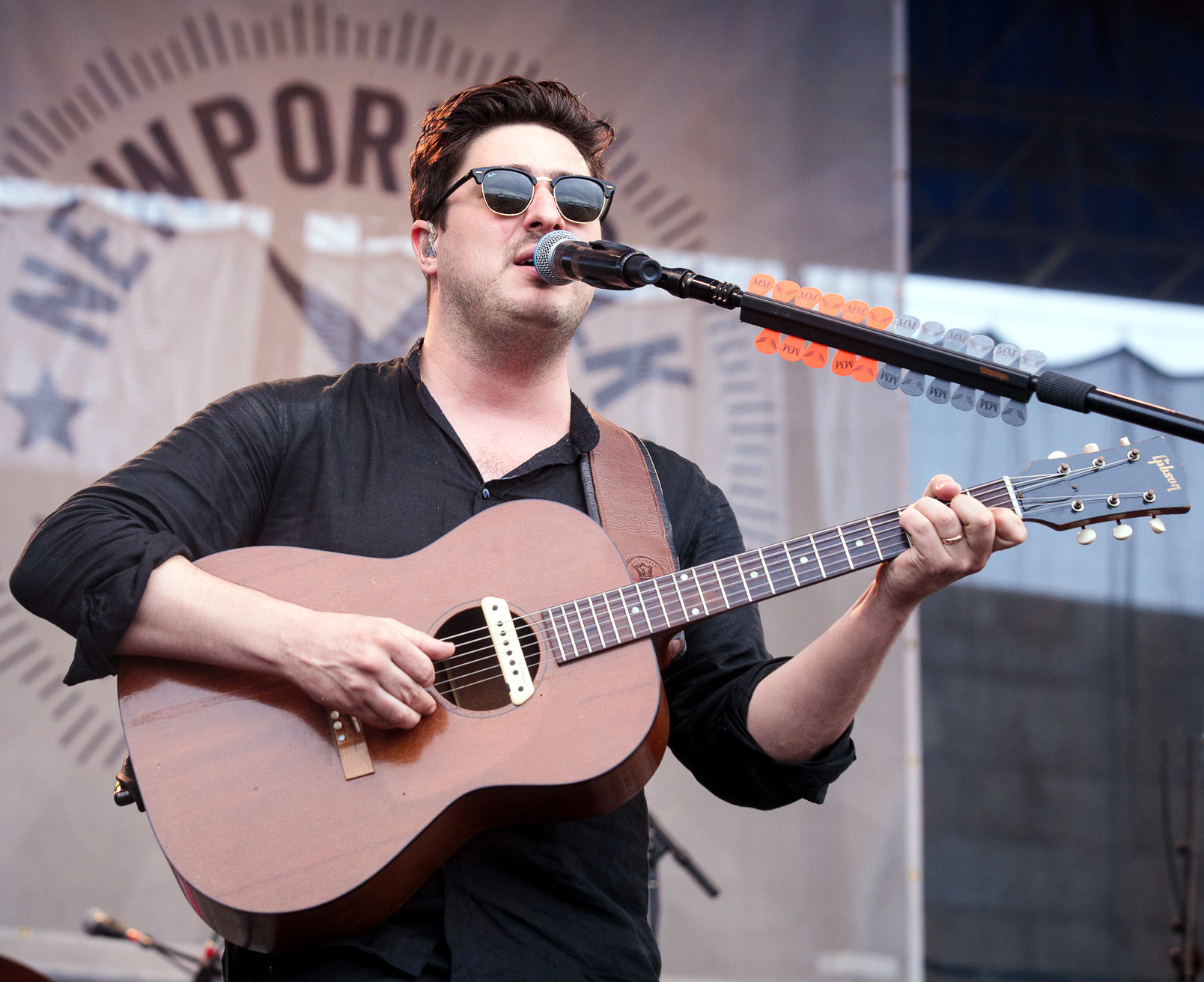
- Mumford at Newport Folk Festival in 2018
- Born: Marcus Oliver Johnstone Mumford; 31 January 1987 (age 39); Yorba Linda, California, U.S.
- Citizenship: United Kingdom; United States
- Occupations: Musician; singer; songwriter; record producer
- Years active: 2007–present
- Spouse: Carey Mulligan (m. 2012)
- Children: 3
- Musical career
- Origin: Wimbledon, London
- Genres: Americana; folk rock; indie folk; alternative rock
- Instruments: Vocals; guitar; drums; mandolin; piano; banjo; ukulele; glockenspiel; percussion
- Member of: Mumford & Sons; The New Basement Tapes

Marcus Oliver Johnstone Mumford (born 31 January 1987) is a British folk musician and singer. He is the lead singer of the folk band Mumford & Sons and also plays a number of instruments with the group, including guitar, drums, and mandolin.

== Early life and career ==
Mumford was born on 31 January 1987 in Yorba Linda, California to parents John and Eleanor (née Weir-Breen) Mumford, international leaders of the Vineyard Churches. As a result, he has held both UK and US citizenship from birth. Mumford has an older brother, James. Mumford's family moved back to the UK when he was six months old. He grew up on Chatsworth Avenue in Wimbledon Chase, southwest London, and was educated at King's College School in Wimbledon, where he met future band member Ben Lovett. Mumford has revealed that he was sexually abused as a child: "Not by family and not in the church, which might be some people's assumption. But I hadn't told anyone about it for 30 years".

After his first year of study at the University of Edinburgh, he returned to London to focus on his music career, and began playing drums for Laura Marling on tour, along with the other current members of Mumford & Sons. It was through touring with Marling and gaining experience playing gigs as well as experimenting with his early writing that they decided to form the band in 2007.

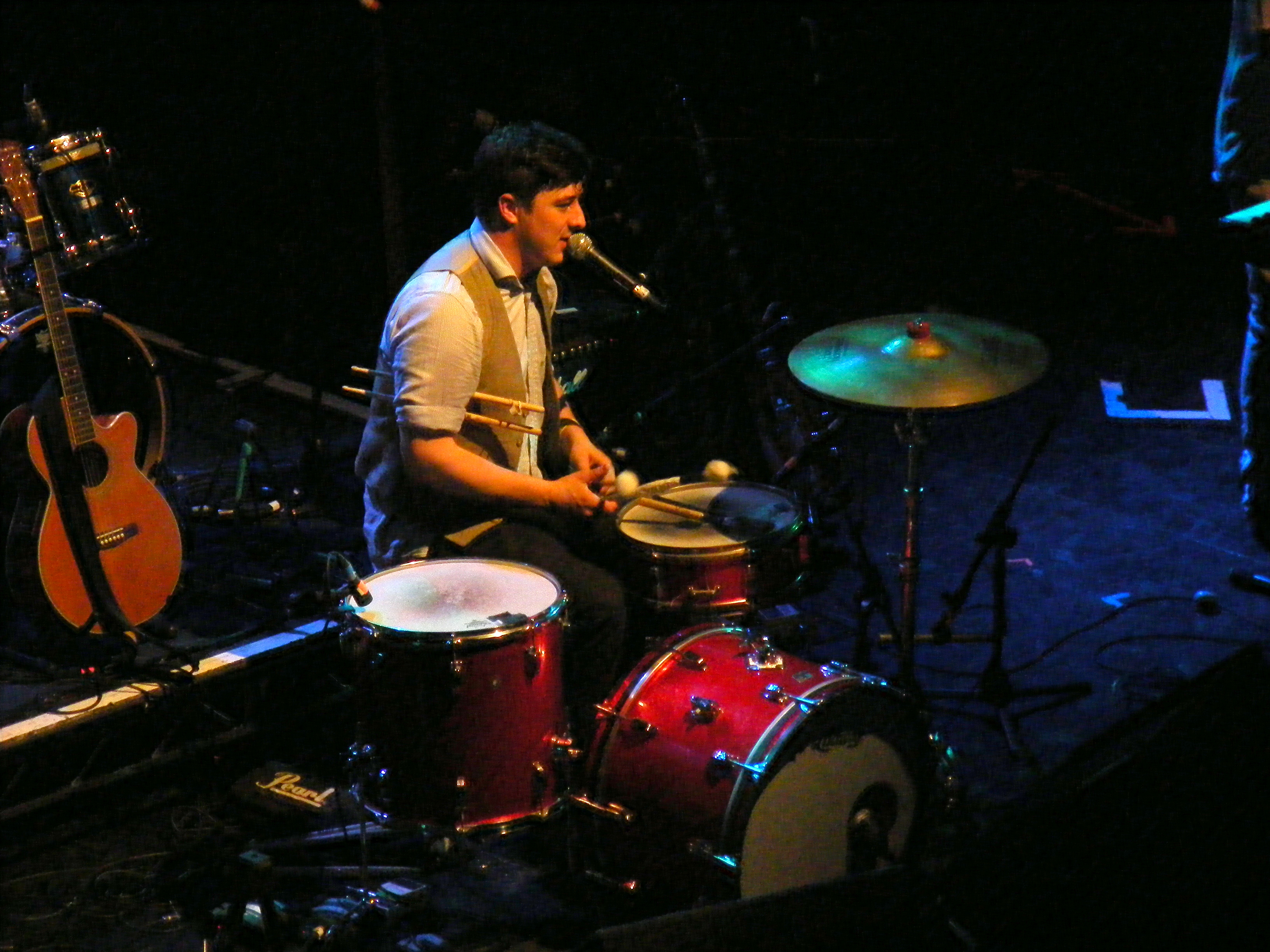
Mumford performing in 2009.

Mumford was included in the Forbes 30 Under 30 list of music stars in December 2012 for his achievements with his band. Forbes commented of the list, which also included acts such as Adele and Rihanna: "In sum they represent the entrepreneurial, creative and intellectual best of their generation. Individually, they are engaging, surprising and incredibly hardworking."

Mumford sang a cover of "Dink's Song" with Oscar Isaac for the 2013 Coen brothers film Inside Llewyn Davis. Although he is not seen in the film, Mumford voices the protagonist's musical partner, Mike, who dies by suicide before the beginning of the film.

Mumford is featured on the 2014 album Lost on the River: The New Basement Tapes, a collective/Supergroup with other musicians including Elvis Costello, Rhiannon Giddens, Taylor Goldsmith, Jim James, produced by T Bone Burnett. Mumford takes co-writing credits on tracks "Kansas City", "When I Get My Hands on You", "Stranger", "The Whistle Is Blowing", and "Lost on the River #20". On 23 September 2014, the video for "When I Get My Hands on You" was released and features him on lead vocals.

Mumford & Sons' third album, Wilder Mind, was released on 4 May 2015.

Mumford & Sons' fourth album, Delta, was released on 16 November 2018, featuring appearances from Maggie Rogers, Yebba and Gill Landry.

On 12 July 2022, Mumford announced his debut solo album Self-Titled would be released in September of that year. Produced by Blake Mills, it features guests Brandi Carlile, Phoebe Bridgers, Clairo and Monica Martin and includes "Cannibal", a song Mumford wrote in January 2021 about his personal struggles. Steven Spielberg directed the music video for the song, which was shot on 3 July in a high school gym in New York.

== Production work ==
In 2014, Mumford produced Hold Fast by Christian Letts (Edward Sharpe and the Magnetic Zeros), released February 2015. Mumford co-wrote four tracks from the record – "Copper Bells", "La Mer", "Emeralds" and "Matches".

Mumford produced the album Gamble for a Rose by King Charles, released January 2016.

In 2025, Mumford produced Say My Name in Your Sleep by Maisie Peters, released November 2025. The collaboration marked their first studio work together and received early critical praise for its intimate production and lyrical depth.

== Personal life ==
In April 2012, he married Carey Mulligan in Somerset. They were childhood pen pals who reconnected as adults. They married a few weeks after working together on the Coen brothers film Inside Llewyn Davis. The couple have three children.

Mumford is a supporter of AFC Wimbledon.

== Discography ==
=== Studio albums ===
List of studio albums, with selected details and chart positions
Title	Details	Peak chart positions									
Title	Details	UK	AUS Hit.	BEL (FL)	BEL (WA)	GER	IRE	NLD	SCO	SWI	US
Self-Titled	Released: 16 September 2022; Label: Island; Formats: CD, LP, digital download, streaming	4	4	11	114	30	25	23	4	50	53

=== Singles ===
==== As lead artist ====
Title	Year	Peak chart positions						Album
Title	Year	UK Down.	SCO	US AAA	US Alt. Air.	US Alt. DL	US Rock Air.	Album
"You'll Never Walk Alone"	2020	72	72	—	—	21	—	Non-album single
"Cannibal"	2022	—	—	—	—	—	—	Self-Titled
"Grace"	2022	—	—	5	16	—	27	Self-Titled
"Better Off High"	2022	—	—	—	—	—	—	Self-Titled
"—" denotes a recording that did not chart or was not released in that territory.

==== As featured artist ====
Title	Year	Peak positions										Album
Title	Year	UK Indie	BEL (FL)	BEL (WA)	CZR	ICE	MEX	NLD	NZ Hot	SVK	US Rock	Album
"Lay Your Head on Me" (Major Lazer featuring Marcus Mumford)	2020	38	43	15	94	33	15	29	34	98	26	Music Is the Weapon

=== Soundtracks ===
- Ted Lasso (2020)

=== Guest appearances ===
Title	Year	Artist(s)	Album
"The Auld Triangle"	2013	Chris Thile, Chris Eldridge, Justin Timberlake and Gabe Witcher	Inside Llewyn Davis
"Fare Thee Well (Dink's Song)"	2013	Oscar Isaac	Inside Llewyn Davis
"Find Another Way"	2018	Tom Morello	The Atlas Underground
"Cowboy Like Me"	2020	Taylor Swift	Evermore
"If You Let Me"	2026	Maisie Peters	Florescence

=== Music videos ===
Title	Year	Director
"You'll Never Walk Alone"	2020	Nicolas Jack Davies
"Cannibal"	2022	Steven Spielberg
"Grace"	2022	Diane Martel
