= Pregaming =

Process of getting drunk prior to going out socializing

Pregaming (also known as pre-booze, pre-drinking or pre-loading) is the process of getting drunk prior to going out socializing, typically done by college students and young adults in a manner as cost-efficient as possible, with hard liquor and cheap beer consumed while in group.

Although pregaming is typically done before a night out, it can also precede other activities, like attending a college football game, large party, social function, or another activity where possession of alcohol may be limited or prohibited. The name "pregaming" spread from the drinking that took place during tailgating before football games to encompass similar drinking periods.

Other terms for the practice are pre-partying and prefunking.

== Background ==
=== Origins ===
Pregaming first became popular in the United States in the 1990s, becoming a common practice after Mothers Against Drunk Driving pressured the federal government to coerce states into increasing the legal drinking age in the United States to 21. It is also an unintended consequence of alcohol laws that prohibit happy hours and other discounts on alcohol, as well as rising tuition and other costs for students. Pregaming minimizes the cost of purchasing alcohol at local bars and clubs and can reduce the problems associated with obtaining and using fake identification listing an age permitting legal consumption of alcohol. The high cost of bar tabs in nightlife and the difficult financial situations often faced by students and young adults has been a major factor increasing the rate of pregaming.

Pregaming appeals to persons under 21 years of age who may not otherwise legally enter bars or purchase alcohol in the United States. Pregaming also ensures that the drinker is drunk before going out in public, lessens inhibitions, and can stall the going-on process so that the group enters the local nightlife scene at a more exciting hour. Pregaming is also often motivated by the higher cost of alcohol in licensed venues, and many people also choose to pre-drink to achieve rapid intoxication, or to facilitate socializing with friends. Pregaming may also increase in probability after the age of 30 among people in Brazil, Canada, England, Ireland, New Zealand and the United States.

=== Activities ===
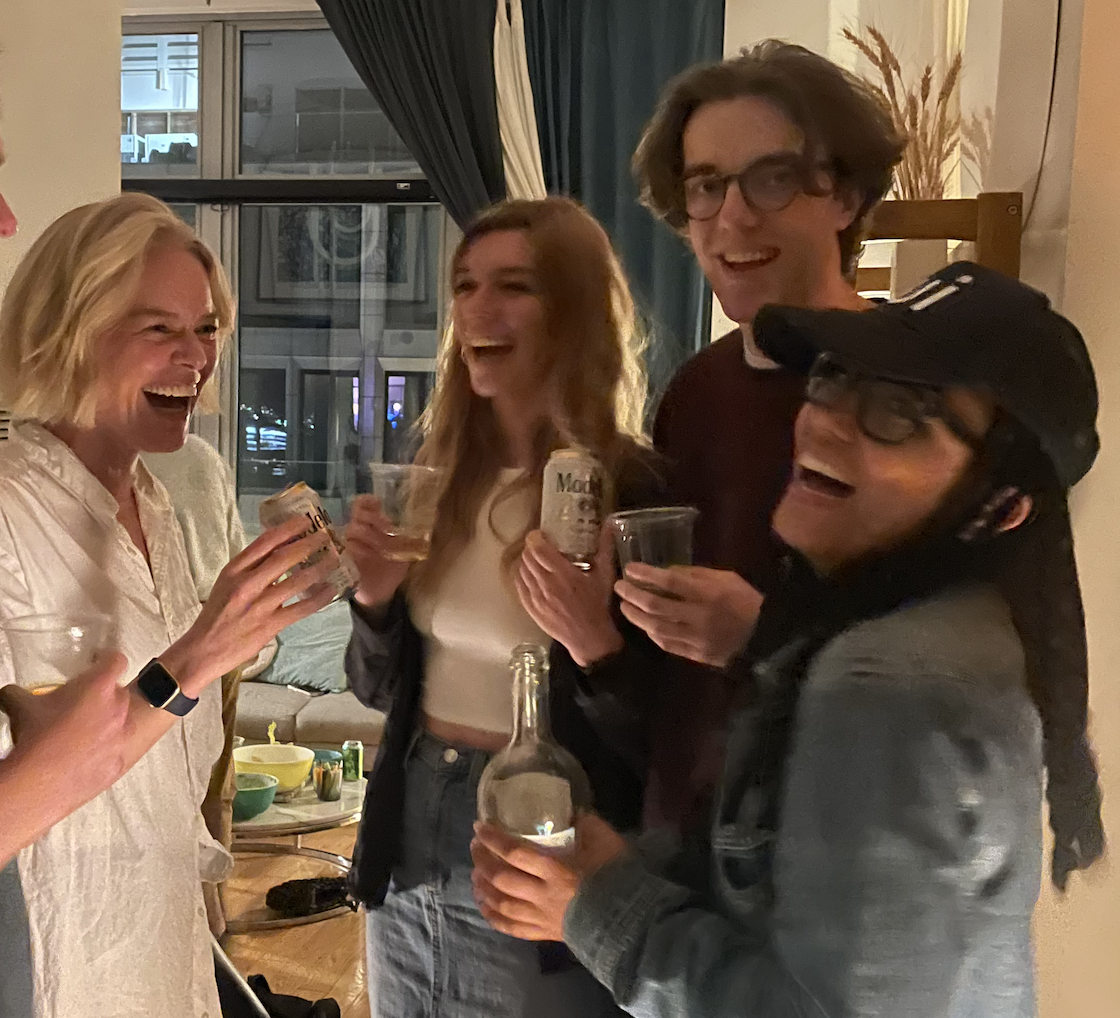
Friends pregame at an apartment before going to a bar (2024)

Drinking games associated with pregaming include Power Hour, Quarters, Kings, and Asshole. One function of the pregaming games is to increase camaraderie, while offering competition and social interplay.

Pregaming sessions are often single sex, and can feature playing heavy drinking games or video games. Other activities that can accompany pregaming, especially for women, are primping and trying on different outfits. Another element of pregaming is texting friends to find out about social opportunities for the night, flirting, and trying to locate a sexual partner for later that night. Having a "shower beer" while getting ready to go out is also a form of pregaming.

Pregaming and the games that go with it can also build solidarity among the drinking group, mentally preparing them with the confidence needed to handle the experience of nightlife. Pregaming is also often more conducive to socializing with friends than the loud nightclubs and bars where the group will eventually arrive.

=== Pervasiveness ===
Experts believe that 65 to 75 percent of college-age youths predrink, while in the UK, a study reported that 55 percent of men and 60 percent of women acknowledged pre-drinking. Researchers believe that the practice is becoming more widespread due to changing cultural mores, alcohol laws, and economics.

== Effects ==
=== Local business ===
Local bars and clubs lose business from pregaming both because students purchase alcohol elsewhere and because pregaming can delay students' arrival, pushing these businesses toward failure. Young adults often don't arrive until 11:30 pm or midnight, relatively near the time bars are required to close in many U.S. states.

Local bars might sell only one or two drinks to students who have consumed alcohol heavily earlier in the night. In addition, nightlife establishments may become liable for fines and civil and criminal penalties under local laws prohibiting the serving of alcohol to an intoxicated person or permitting a person to be intoxicated in the bar, even when that person pregamed elsewhere and entered the bar before the alcohol caused intoxication.

=== Health ===
Pregaming has been associated with binge drinking and other dangerous activities, leading some universities to attempt to crack down on the practice. Government agencies at both the state and federal level have studied the problems created by pregaming.

The furtive nature of pregaming and bingeing can lead to massive quick consumption, acute alcohol poisoning, hospitalization, and death.

A 2012 study of more 250 Swiss students indicated that those who "pre-loaded" ended up consuming more total alcohol over the night (seven drinks rather than four) and engaged in riskier behavior. They had a 24% chance of reporting negative consequences for drinking (such as injury, unprotected sex, and unplanned drug use), compared to 18% chance for those who did not pre-drink.
