= Self-Titled (Marcus Mumford album) =

2022 studio album

Studio album by Marcus Mumford
- Released: 16 September 2022
- Studios: Sound City, Los Angeles
- Length: 37:33
- Label: Island
- Producer: Blake Mills

Singles from Self-Titled
- 1. "Cannibal" Released: 14 July 2022; 2. "Grace" Released: 30 July 2022; 3. "Better Off High" Released: 25 August 2022

Self-Titled (stylised in all lowercase with parentheses) is the debut album by Marcus Mumford, released on 16 September 2022 via Island Records. The album features guest appearances by Phoebe Bridgers, Brandi Carlile, Clairo, and Monica Martin, in addition to being produced by Blake Mills.

== Style and reception ==
Self-Titled ratings
Aggregate scores
Source	Rating
AnyDecentMusic?	6.3/10
Metacritic	67/100
Review scores
Source	Rating
AllMusic	3.5/5 stars
The Arts Desk	3/5 stars
DIY	3/5 stars
Evening Standard	4/5 stars
The Independent	3/5 stars
NME	4/5 stars
Pitchfork	6.0/10
The Times	4/5 stars
The Telegraph	4/5 stars
Uncut	5/10

The Arts Desk's Barney Harsent opens by quoting opening track "Cannibal": "I can still taste you and I hate it/That wasn't a choice in the mind of a child and you knew it/You took the first slice of me and you ate it raw/Ripped at it with your teeth and your lips like a cannibal/You fucking animal." About these lines, Harsent says they "are the first indication this might not be the album you've been expecting. Even if you're already aware of the childhood abuse the singer suffered, and which inspired this collection songs, prior knowledge does little to prepare you for the visceral punch those words pack." Harsent goes on to describe the "particularly affecting sense of linear narrative" of second song "Grace", about Mumford's conversation with his mother about the abuse, saying that unlike "Cannibal", "Grace" "bursts into life like Tom Petty gatecrashing a therapy session" and is "unexpectedly and defiantly upbeat, the sound of a weight being lifted." Harsent summarises the album as "unlikely to win over any new fans", though it "may force a few naysayers to admit he's got a decent set of pipes", but "Ultimately, it's an album about redefining oneself in spite of life's labels and, at a time when we're surrounded on all sides by performative, shrieking grief, it feels genuine: raw, open and honest."

DIY's Emma Swann compares the album to Vegemite and Marmite, calling it "the same, but different", noting that "when [Mumford] strips it right back" such as on "Prior Warning", "Dangerous Game", and the beginning of "Cannibal", there's "a warm quality to his songwriting that seeps through." But after "Cannibal", when "everything crashes, kitchen sink and all, as if years of headlining arenas trigger a fear response if too long passes before the 'epic' is switched on", we end up with an album which is "just Marcus leaving the kids at home for an evening, only to do the same exact thing just without a chorus of 'are we there yet', 'I'm bored', and 'well, actually...'"

NME's Elizabeth Aubrey notes "Only Child" as "skeletally acoustic" and "resembl[ing] a devastating Paul McCartney ballad in both sound and structure", while "Prior Warning" depicts Mumford's spiral into "alcoholism and a dangerous cycle of self-medication" with "solitary strings" and "Better Off High" tells of an intervention staged by his family "as recounted on the album's most unsettling and experimental track". Aubrey also highlights Blake Mills's production as "exquisite throughout".

Pitchfork's Stephen Thomas Erlewine calls the album "confounding", writing that "its strongest qualities as a record occasionally contradict the emotional thrust of the songs. Mills' production gives the recordings dimension and depth, inevitably tempering the pain at the heart of the songs." And while the "sumptuous, cinematic ... almost soothing" sound is "more appealing than the buttoned-up folk of Mumford & Sons, it also undercuts the rawer journey that (self-titled) could have been." The Telegraph's Neil McCormick notes that "while the sound sometimes swells to an epic rush that pushes Mumford up to the top of his register, the tone of Self-Titled is more intimate than anything in his catalogue so far", with some songs "verg[ing] towards underpowered" and not "achiev[ing] transcendence", but "when it lands a blow, you know that you've been hit."

=== Year-end lists ===
Self-Titled on year-end lists
Publication	#	Ref.
The Economist	—N/a	
The Sunday Times	8	

== Track listing ==
Self-Titled track listing
No.	Title	Writer(s)	Producer(s)	Length
1.	"Cannibal"	Marcus Mumford; Blake Mills	Mills	4:00
2.	"Grace"	Mumford; Mills	Mills	4:13
3.	"Prior Warning"	Mumford; Julia Michaels; Mills	Mills; Kid Harpoon^{[a]}; Mumford^{[a]}; Sounwave^{[a]}	3:30
4.	"Better Off High"	Mumford; Mills	Mills; Joseph Lorge	4:30
5.	"Only Child"	Mumford; Mills	Mills; Lorge	4:27
6.	"Dangerous Game" (featuring Clairo)	Mumford; Clairo; Mills	Mills	3:01
7.	"Better Angels"	Mumford; Mills; Robin Pecknold; Tobias Jesso Jr.	Mills; Kid Harpoon^{[a]}; Mumford^{[a]}	3:25
8.	"Go In Light" (featuring Monica Martin)	Mumford; Reuben James; Ethan Gruska; Ryan Beatty; Mills	Mills; Mumford^{[a]}; Raphael Saadiq^{[a]}; Sounwave^{[a]}	3:01
9.	"Stonecatcher" (featuring Phoebe Bridgers)	Mumford; Mills	Mills	3:42
10.	"How" (with Brandi Carlile)	Mumford; Brandi Carlile	Mills	3:44
Total length:				37:33

Deluxe CD bonus tracks
No.	Title	Length
11.	"Better Off High" (on my phone)	3:33
12.	"Grace" (on my phone)	3:23

== Personnel ==
Musicians

- Marcus Mumford – vocals (all tracks), acoustic guitar (1, 4, 6–10), drums (1, 4, 7, 8), electric guitar (1–3, 6, 7), percussion (2, 4, 6–8), bass guitar (3), guitarrón (3), synth bass (3), piano (4), Wurlitzer electronic piano (9)
- Blake Mills – acoustic guitar (1, 2, 4–9), drums (1, 8), electric guitar (1, 2, 4, 6–9), organ (1, 3), percussion (1–8), synthesizer (1, 6, 7, 9), harmonium (2), piano (2, 4, 5, 10), synth bass (2, 4), vocals (2, 7), drum programming (4), celesta (5), bass guitar (6–8), 12-string acoustic guitar (8)
- Jim Keltner – cymbals (1), drums (6, 9), percussion (6)
- Joseph Lorge – baritone guitar (2), electric guitar (10)
- Pino Palladino – bass guitar (2)
- Steve Ferrone – drums (2)
- Reuben James – organ (2), synthesizer (8)
- Rob Moose – strings (2, 6, 9, 10)
- Danielle Ponder – vocals (2)
- Gavin Batty – vocals (2)
- Abe Rounds – tambourine (4)
- Muskers – vocals (5)
- Clairo – vocals (6)
- Lemar Carter – drums (8)
- Monica Martin – vocals (8)
- Bryan Stevenson – piano (9)
- Phoebe Bridgers – vocals (9)
- Hideaki Aomori – clarinet (10)
- Aaron Embry – piano (10)
- Brandi Carlile – vocals (10)

Technical

- Patricia Sullivan – mastering
- Blake Mills – mixing
- Joseph Lorge – mixing, engineering
- Brandon Bost – engineering (3), additional engineering (7, 8)
- Danielle Goldsmith – engineering assistance
- Gabe Lowry – engineering assistance
- Logan Taylor – engineering assistance
- Scott Moore – engineering assistance
- Brian Rajaratnam – engineering assistance
- Hotae Alexander Jang – engineering assistance

Visual

- Todd Tourso – creative direction, package design
- James Marcus Haney – photography
- Robin Harper – photography

== Charts ==
Chart performance for Self-Titled
Chart (2022)	Peak position
Australian Digital Albums (ARIA)	14
Australian Hitseekers Albums (ARIA)	4
Belgian Albums (Ultratop Flanders)	11
Belgian Albums (Ultratop Wallonia)	114
Dutch Albums (Album Top 100)	23
German Albums (Offizielle Top 100)	30
Irish Albums (Official Charts)	25
Scottish Albums (Official Charts)	4
Swiss Albums (Schweizer Hitparade)	50
UK Albums (Official Charts)	4
UK Album Downloads (Official Charts)	5
UK Americana Albums (Official Charts)	1
UK Folk Albums (Official Charts)	1
US Billboard 200	53
US Top Alternative Albums (Billboard)	3
US Top Rock Albums (Billboard)	9
