= Scott Street =

2017 song by Phoebe Bridgers

Song by Phoebe Bridgers

from the album Stranger in the Alps
- Released: September 22, 2017
- Length: 5:05
- Label: Dead Oceans
- Songwriters: Phoebe Bridgers; Marshall Vore
- Producers: Tony Berg; Ethan Gruska

Music video
- "Scott Street" on YouTube

"Scott Street" is a song by American singer-songwriter Phoebe Bridgers. It was released on September 22, 2017, as the fifth track from her debut studio album Stranger in the Alps (2017). The song was co-written with her ex-boyfriend and then-band drummer Marshall Vore.

A music video for "Scott Street" was released on September 6, 2018, a month before the release of Strangers in the Alps' deluxe edition.

== Background ==
"Scott Street" is named after Scott Avenue, a road in Echo Park near the Bedrock L.A. practice facility where Bridgers used to store music equipment with Vore.

Bridgers stated that the song "is about being really lonely... Sometimes I want to cop out and say it's about a lot of different things, but really it's all there. It's just a diary."

== Music video ==
In September of 2018, ahead of the re-release of Strangers in the Alps as a deluxe version, Bridgers released a music video for "Scott Street" which depicted countless doppelgängers of herself acted by people in identical wigs. The music video was directed by Alex Lill.

== Critical reception ==
Consequence of Sound ranked "Scott Street" third in a list of the ten best Bridgers songs, calling it one of her "most beloved tracks from Stranger in the Alps" and remarking on its "beautiful portrait" and "very real feelings of isolation and exhausting." Similarly, Far Out Magazine ranked it third in a list of the ten saddest Bridgers songs, noting its "painful pang of nostalgia for childhood lost."

The Fader, in a profile of Bridgers, noted her fondness for Elliott Smith's music and compared "Scott Street" to "St. Ides Heaven," specifically for her usage of the lyric "open container" and songwriting around a lonesome walk down a street.

Uproxx observed Bridgers' acceptance of "mundane sadness (mixed with borderline alcoholism)" through the imagery of her "day-drinking alone in public" in "Scott Street," along with other songs on Strangers in the Alps, ultimately finding the record full of "comfort and empathy."

== Other usage ==
The song was included on the soundtrack of Someone Great, a 2019 romcom film released on Netflix.

For Apple Music in August 2021, Spacey Jane covered "Scott Street" alongside acoustic versions of two songs of their own.

The song was also used in the video game Life Is Strange: True Colors.

The song was used in the final scene of the final episode of The Summer I Turned Pretty titled "At Last"

== Certifications ==
Certifications for "Scott Street"
Region	Certification	Certified units/sales
New Zealand (RMNZ)	Gold	15,000^{‡}
United Kingdom (BPI)	Gold	400,000^{‡}
^{‡} Sales+streaming figures based on certification alone.
