= Stranger in the Alps =

Studio album by Phoebe Bridgers
- Released: September 22, 2017
- Studios: Zeitgeist, Los Angeles, California
- Genres: Indie rock; indie folk
- Length: 44:15
- Label: Dead Oceans
- Producers: Tony Berg; Ethan Gruska

Phoebe Bridgers chronology
Killer (2015)	Stranger in the Alps (2017)	Boygenius (2018)

Singles from Stranger in the Alps
- 1. "Killer" Released: April 28, 2015; 2. "Smoke Signals" Released: January 9, 2017; 3. "Motion Sickness" Released: July 18, 2017; 4. "Funeral" Released: September 12, 2017

Stranger in the Alps is the debut studio album by American musician Phoebe Bridgers, released on September 22, 2017, by Dead Oceans.

According to Loudwire, lyrics for the single "Motion Sickness" were among the most-searched in the indie rock genre according to a study that examined Google searches from January 2019 through July 2023.

== Background and recording ==
Stranger in the Alps was produced by Tony Berg and Ethan Gruska. Bridgers recorded the album in between tours over 2016 at Berg's studio in Brentwood, Los Angeles. The album's title is a reference to the edited-for-TV version of the film The Big Lebowski, which changed the Walter Sobchak (John Goodman) line "Do you see what happens when you fuck a stranger in the ass?" to "Do you see what happens when you find a stranger in the Alps?" Bridgers opted to use the phrase because she found it to be "kind of poetic on accident".

== Release and promotion ==
Bridgers signed a recording contract with Dead Oceans in June 2017, and the album was scheduled for release on September 22. The album received a limited edition 5th anniversary galaxy colored vinyl pressing on September 22, 2022.

== Music and lyrics ==
Ben Salmon of Paste Magazine described Stranger in the Alps as "a collection of sad folk songs." Pete Wild of The Skinny drew comparison between the album and the work of Mary Lou Lord and Margo Timmins. The album incorporates fiddle and electro-noise. The album's lyrics contain references to David Bowie and Jeffrey Dahmer.

== Critical reception ==
Professional ratings
Aggregate scores
Source	Rating
AnyDecentMusic?	7.8/10
Metacritic	82/100
Review scores
Source	Rating
AllMusic	3.5/5 stars
The A.V. Club	A
Consequence of Sound	A−
Exclaim!	9/10
The Irish Times	4/5 stars
Mojo	4/5 stars
NME	4/5 stars
Pitchfork	7.0/10
Q	4/5 stars
Uncut	6/10

Stranger in the Alps received acclaim from critics; review aggregator Metacritic gave the album a weighted average score of 82/100 based on 16 critic reviews, indicating "universal acclaim".

Josh Modell of The A.V. Club gave the album a perfect score, saying, "Stranger in the Alps alchemizes sorrow into redemptive beauty. It's never about wallowing, but about slowly moving through it. That difference, played out over some incredible, wise-beyond-her-years songwriting, makes it one of the best albums of the year." Writing for Pitchfork, Sam Sodomsky said that the album is "a collection of songs about intimacy, documenting how our relationships affect the way we view ourselves and interact with others... Bridgers' voice has a breezy, conversational flutter [that] sounds best when she double-tracks it in layers of light falsetto", rating the album 7.0/10. Leonie Cooper of NME gave the album a score of four stars out of five, and wrote: "A kind of urban folksiness runs deep through the record, and the strummed softness of 'Would You Rather' even features Bright Eyes' Conor Oberst. The downbeat vibe is cut through by unmitigated banger 'Motion Sickness' but Strangers In The Alps is definitely album for the sad times."

Ben Salmon of Paste highlighted the album as one of the best debut albums of 2017, calling the album "a masterpiece". Q gave the album four stars out of five, and wrote: "Across these songs, Bridgers manages an unusual marriage of delicacy and lo-fi wit, and it's a union that has led her to quietly make one of the albums of the year." DIY gave the album a score of 8 of 10 and said the album "is as accomplished a solo debut as you’ll hear all year--a quietly devastating listen worthy of Phoebe Bridgers’ obvious influences." James Skinner of Drowned in Sound also gave the album this score, and said: "Some songs come close, but none hit quite as hard as Stranger in the Alps’ haunting bookends. All the same, the record is a stunning achievement, and one that heralds the arrival of a major talent." Steven Loftin of The Line of Best Fit also gave the album this score, and wrote: "Once the record's over, you'll feel like you’ve been dropped in a dark part of town after being left heartbroken--which is exactly what music like this should do."

Uncut gave the album a lukewarm review, awarding it a score of 6 of 10. "Throughout, her lyrics betray a convincing world-weariness." The Skinny also gave the album this score, and wrote: "Bridgers is someone finding her way, trying things out, rarely settling for easy when something more is called for."

== Track listing ==
No.	Title	Writer(s)	Length
1.	"Smoke Signals"	Phoebe Bridgers; Marshall Vore	5:24
2.	"Motion Sickness"	Bridgers; Vore	3:49
3.	"Funeral"	Bridgers	3:52
4.	"Demi Moore"	Bridgers; Vore; Harrison Whitford	3:18
5.	"Scott Street"	Bridgers; Vore	5:05
6.	"Killer"	Bridgers	3:09
7.	"Georgia"	Bridgers	4:07
8.	"Chelsea"	Bridgers	4:42
9.	"Would You Rather"	Bridgers; Vore; Tony Berg	3:19
10.	"You Missed My Heart"	Mark Kozelek; Jimmy LaValle	6:57
11.	"Smoke Signals (Reprise)"	Bridgers; Vore	0:33
Total length:			44:15

Deluxe digital reissue
No.	Title	Writer(s)	Length
12.	"It'll All Work Out"	Tom Petty	2:46
13.	"Motion Sickness" (demo)	Bridgers; Vore	4:24
Total length:			51:25

== Personnel ==
Credits adapted from liner notes.

=== Musicians ===
- Phoebe Bridgers – vocals, guitar, banjo
- Tony Berg – guitar, keyboards
- John Doe – vocals
- Ethan Gruska – keyboards, piano, drums, percussion, drum programming, guitar, bass, baritone guitar, bandura, jet engine, "that incessant toe tapping"
- Greg Leisz – pedal steel guitar
- Rob Moose – strings
- Gabe Noel – cello, bass
- Conor Oberst – vocals
- Daniel Rhine – upright bass
- Gabe Witcher – violin
- Marshall Vore – drums, percussion, vocals
- Harrison Whitford – guitar

=== Production and artwork ===
- Tony Berg – production, recording
- Ethan Gruska – production
- Mike Mogis – mixing
- Bob Ludwig – mastering
- Rob Moose – string arrangement
- Angela Deane – artwork
- Elaine Gandola – photography
- Frank W. Ockenfels III – photography
- Bridgers' mother – photography
- Nathaniel David Utesch – layout

== Charts ==
Chart performance for Stranger in the Alps
Chart (2017–2022)	Peak position
Scottish Albums (Official Charts)	97
UK Americana Albums (Official Charts)	5
UK Album Downloads (Official Charts)	84
UK Independent Albums (OCC)	23
US Billboard 200	82
US Heatseekers Albums (Billboard)	13
US Top Alternative Albums (Billboard)	6
US Independent Albums (Billboard)	13
US Top Rock Albums (Billboard)	10
US Americana/Folk Albums (Billboard)	4

== Certifications ==
Certifications for Stranger in the Alps
Region	Certification	Certified units/sales
United Kingdom (BPI)	Gold	100,000^{‡}
United States (RIAA)	Gold	500,000^{‡}
^{‡} Sales+streaming figures based on certification alone.
