= Honey (Samia album) =

2023 album by American musician Samia

Studio album by Samia
- Released: January 27, 2023
- Studio: Betty's (Durham, North Carolina)
- Genres: Pop; indie rock
- Length: 40:06
- Label: Grand Jury
- Producers: Caleb Wright; Rostam Batmanglij

Samia chronology
Scout (2021)	Honey (2023)	Bloodless (2025)

Singles from Honey
- 1. "Kill Her Freak Out" Released: September 27, 2022; 2. "Mad at Me" Released: November 1, 2022; 3. "Pink Balloon / Sea Lions" Released: December 6, 2022; 4. "Breathing Song / Honey" Released: January 24, 2023

Honey is the second studio album by American singer-songwriter Samia. It was released on January 27, 2023, via Grand Jury Music. It serves as the follow-up to her debut album The Baby (2020).

== Conception ==
During her interview with BrooklynVegan, when asked about her album, Samia said that: "This record is about learning to see the love around you" and also stated that "Sometimes the only thing I can be certain of is the way it feels. Even when I zoom all the way out, the little things matter the most. I was trying to imagine looking back at the end of life and what I'd have to say about it right now. This is a little bit of it. Telling stories, making amends, trying to show people I love them. It's a community record."

== Singles ==
"Kill Her Freak Out" was released as the album's lead single on September 27, 2022. The single was accompanied by a music video, starring Lucas Hedges, released on the same day. "Mad at Me" was released on November 1, 2022, as the second single from the album. "Pink Balloon" and "Sea Lions" were released as a double single on December 6, 2022. Another double single, "Breathing Song" and "Honey", was released January 24, 2023.

== Style ==
The album has been called pop and indie rock.

== Critical reception ==
Professional ratings
Aggregate scores
Source	Rating
AnyDecentMusic?	7.8/10
Metacritic	81/100
Review scores
Source	Rating
AllMusic	3/5 stars
DIY	4.5/5 stars
Exclaim!	8/10
Gigwise	9/10 stars
The Guardian	5/5 stars
The Line of Best Fit	8/10
NME	4/5 stars
Paste	6.3/10
Under the Radar	7.5/10
Pitchfork	6.5/10

Honey received universal acclaim from music critics upon release. At Metacritic, which assigns a normalized rating out of 100 to reviews from mainstream critics, the album has an average score of 81 based on 12 reviews. Aggregator AnyDecentMusic? gave it 7.8 out of 10, based on their assessment of the critical consensus. AllMusic's Marcy Donelson said "Whether autobiographical or a thought exercise, 'Honey' is evocative and often relatable, if in turn inevitably alienating and mercurial." Elly Watson from DIY stated that "Honey is a bright and inviting pop album that brilliantly captures the emotional snapshots of life." Writing for Exclaim!, Luke Pearson wrote that "Honey takes a traditional, southern-tinged folk foundation and successfully ventures out in various modern directions, allowing her [Samia] adroit lyricism to occupy a variety of spaces." Gigwise writer Lucy Harbron sees Samia as her "lyricism rings through as the top level of every track" and adding that "Samia's finest moments on Honey take you completely by surprise."

== Track listing ==
All tracks are produced by Caleb Wright, except "Mad at Me" by Wright and Rostam Batmanglij.

Honey track listing
No.	Title	Writer(s)	Length
1.	"Kill Her Freak Out"	Samia Finnerty	4:20
2.	"Charm You"	Finnerty; Nick Cianci	2:41
3.	"Pink Balloon"	Finnerty; Wright; Christian Lee Hutson	2:16
4.	"Mad at Me" (featuring Papa Mbye)	Finnerty; Wright; Charlie Hickey; Rostam Batmanglij; Papa Mbye	3:38
5.	"Sea Lions"	Finnerty; Wright	5:19
6.	"To Me It Was"	Finnerty; Hutson	3:59
7.	"Breathing Song"	Finnerty	3:13
8.	"Honey"	Finnerty; Wright	3:23
9.	"Nanana"	Finnerty; Hutson	3:44
10.	"Amelia"	Finnerty; Wright; Sam Rosenstone	3:41
11.	"Dream Song"	Finnerty; Brenna Kassis; Cam Schmidt; Dawson Freeman; Hannah Cole	3:46
Total length:			40:06

Honey LP track listing

Side A
No.	Title	Writer(s)	Length
1.	"Kill Her Freak Out"	Samia Finnerty	4:20
2.	"Charm You"	Finnerty; Nick Cianci	2:41
3.	"Pink Balloon"	Finnerty; Wright; Christian Lee Hutson	2:16
4.	"Mad at Me" (featuring Papa Mbye)	Finnerty; Wright; Charlie Hickey; Rostam Batmanglij; Papa Mbye	3:38
5.	"Sea Lions"	Finnerty; Wright	5:19
6.	"Amelia"	Finnerty; Wright; Sam Rosenstone	3:41
Total length:			21:55

Side B
No.	Title	Writer(s)	Length
7.	"Breathing Song"	Finnerty	3:13
8.	"Honey"	Finnerty; Wright	3:23
9.	"Nanana"	Finnerty; Hutson	3:44
10.	"To Me It Was"	Finnerty; Hutson	3:59
11.	"Dream Song"	Finnerty; Brenna Kassis; Cam Schmidt; Dawson Freeman; Hannah Cole	3:46
Total length:			18:05

== Personnel ==
- Samia Finnerty – vocals
- Caleb Wright – production
- Rostam Batmanglij – co–production on "Mad at Me"
- Alli Blois – engineer
- Christian Lee Hutson – guitar, piano, vocals
- Jon Lindquist – drums
- Sam Rosenstone – keys and piano
- Joey Hays – drums
- Megan Mahoney – bass
- Mitchell Seymour – synth, piano, bass
- Dawson Freeman – guitar, vocals
- Cameron Schmidt – guitar
- Brenna Kassis – vocals
- Hannah Cole – vocals
- Papa Mbye – vocals
- Briston Maroney – vocals
- Jake Luppen – vocals
- Raffaella Meloni – vocals
- Sophia Matinazad and Jacqueline Justice – photography
- Sophia Matinazad – creative design
- Max Taeuschel – LP design
