= Samia (musician) =

American musician (born 1996)

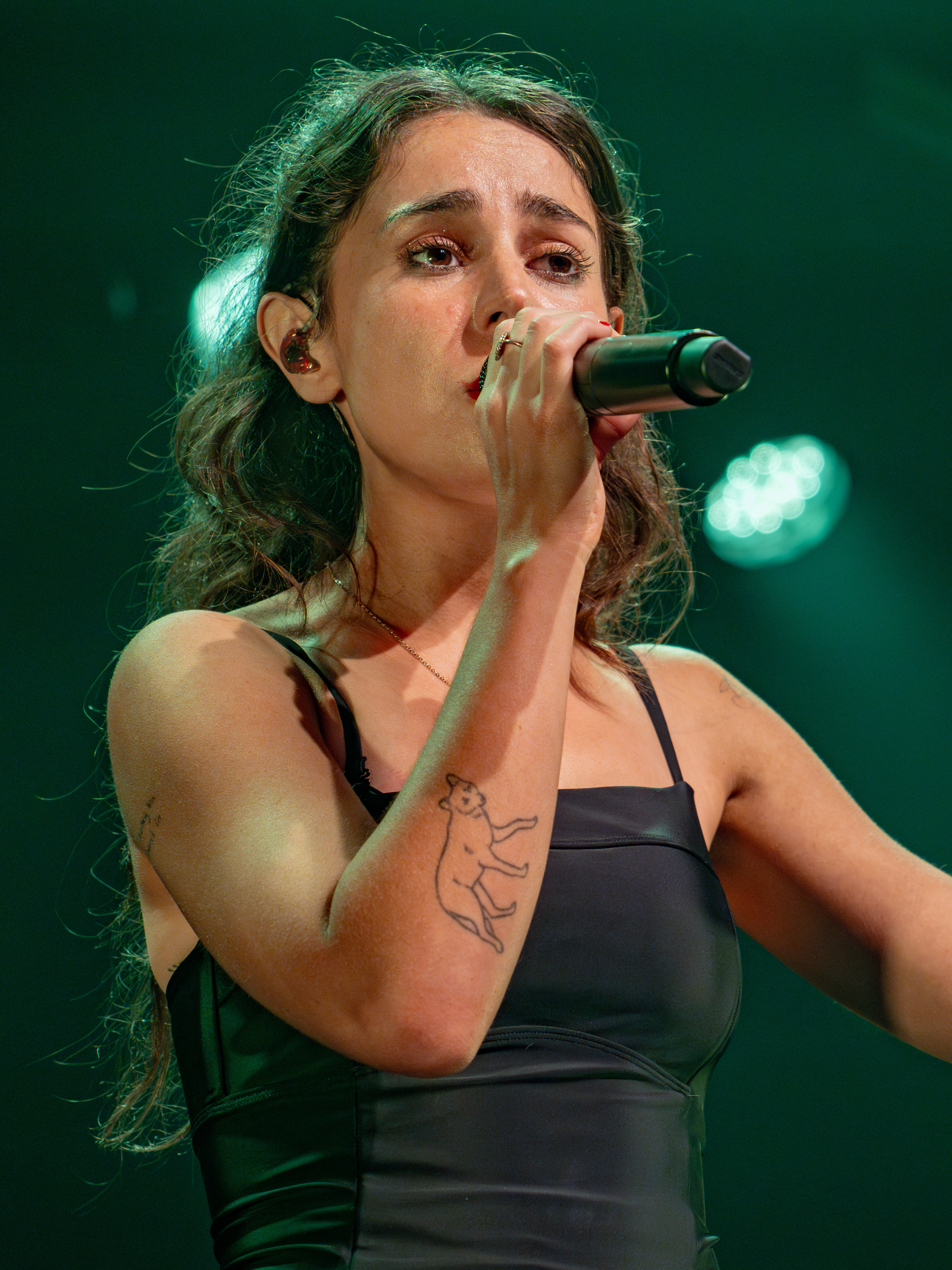
- Samia performing in 2025

Background information
- Born: Samia Najimy Finnerty; December 12, 1996 (age 29); Los Angeles, California, U.S
- Genres: Indie pop; Indie rock
- Occupations: Singer; songwriter; musician
- Instruments: Vocals; guitar; piano
- Years active: 2017–present
- Label: Grand Jury
- Member of: Peach Fuzz
- Website: samiaband.com

Samia Najimy Finnerty (born December 12, 1996) is an American singer-songwriter and musician. She releases her music under the mononym Samia.

== Early life ==
Finnerty was born in Los Angeles to actors Kathy Najimy and Dan Finnerty. She was named after her maternal grandmother, Samia Najimy (née Massery; 1928–2015), who was of Lebanese origin. She moved to New York City when she was fifteen and attended York Preparatory School, and studied at The New School, where she formed a short-lived band.

== Career ==
=== 2017–2019: Early singles ===
Finnerty is a co-recipient of the 2017 Obie Award for Best Ensemble for her performance in Sarah DeLappe's play The Wolves.

Finnerty's single "Someone Tell The Boys" was released in 2017 and quickly gained traction on Spotify after appearing on the Discover Weekly Playlist.

She also released the singles "Milk", "Django", "Welcome to Eden", and "The Night Josh Tillman Listened to My Song" throughout 2017 and 2018 before releasing a two-track EP "Lasting Friend/Paris" in 2019. Finnerty listed her inspiration for the EP as "a revelation about the way that levity and pain coexist".

She also released singles "Ode to Artifice" and a cover of Liz Phair's "Never Said" in 2019.

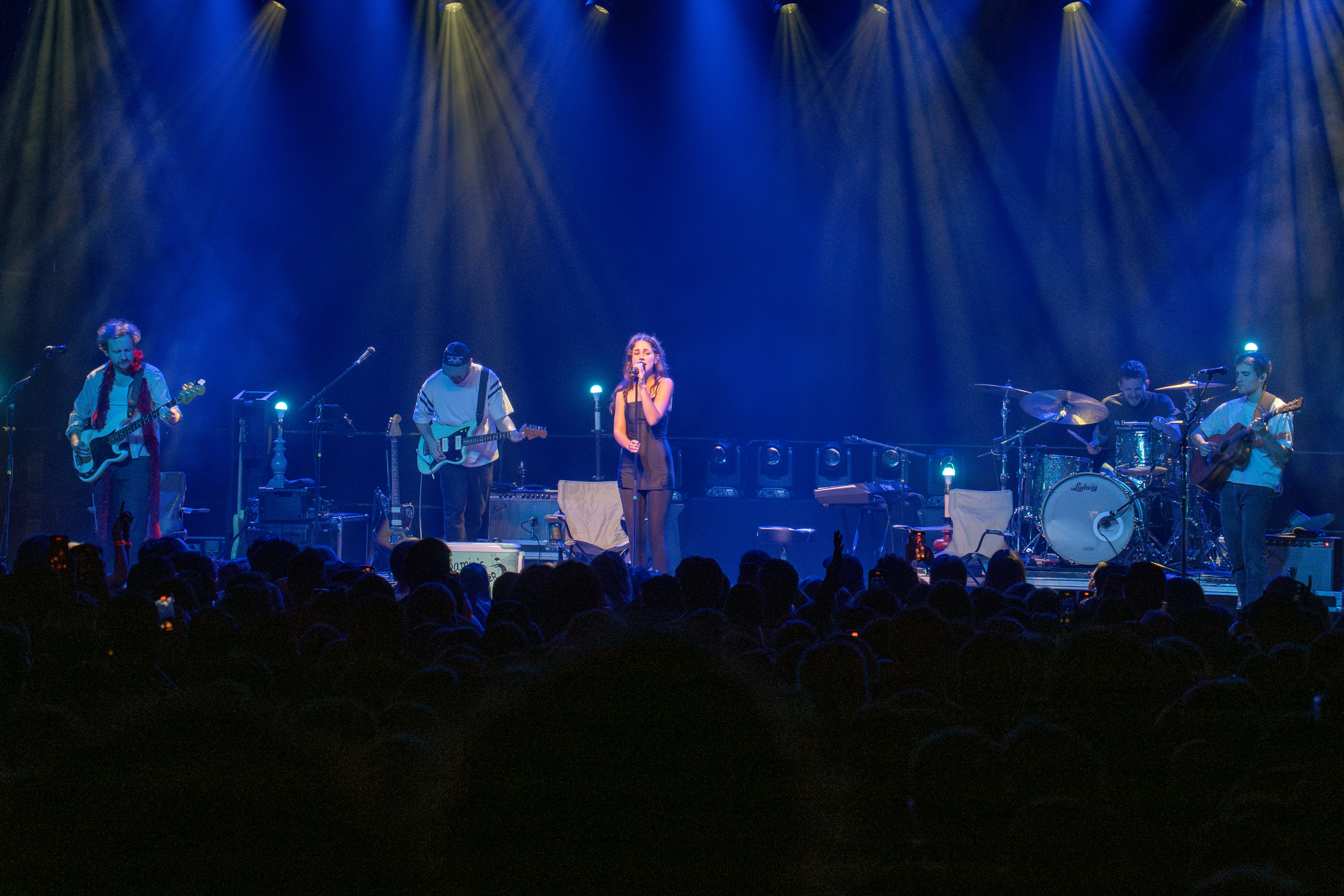
Samia performing at Brooklyn Steel on May 30, 2025

=== 2020: The Baby ===
Finnerty released a new song in April 2020 titled "Is There Something in the Movies?" In June 2020, Finnerty announced her debut studio album alongside a new song titled "Fit n Full". Two more songs from the album, "Big Wheel" and "Stellate," were released together in July 2020, preceding the release of "Triptych" in August 2020. Finnerty released her debut studio album The Baby to positive reviews on August 28, 2020. The first track on the album, "Pool", begins with the last voicemail Finnerty's grandmother left before dying, where she is singing a Lebanese lullaby. Finnerty described the concept of the album as "I am the baby".

Later in 2021 she would release The Baby Reimagined, a collection of covers and remixes of songs from her debut album by artists including Briston Maroney, Anjimile, Charlie Hickey, Field Medic, Christian Lee Hutson, Bartees Strange, and more.

Finnerty appeared briefly in the comedy drama film Let Them All Talk (2020).

=== 2021–2022: Scout and Peach Fuzz ===
In 2021, Finnerty released the extended play Scout, containing three original songs: "As You Are", "Show Up" and "Elephant" as well as a cover of When In Rome's' "The Promise", which featured Jelani Aryeh. The EP released to generally positive reviews.

Finnerty attended the European leg of Maggie Rogers' Feral Joy Tour as a "special guest" in 2022.

Also in 2022, Finnerty formed the group Peach Fuzz with artists Raffaella, Sara L'Abriola (who uses artist name Hank Heaven), and Victoria Zaro (who uses artist name Ryann). They released a 4-track debut EP on July 22, Can Mary Dood the Moon?, with lead single "Hey Dood".

=== 2022–2023: Honey ===
In September 2022, Finnerty released the single "Kill Her Freak Out" and announced her upcoming second album, Honey. Subsequent singles from the album include "Mad At Me" with Papa Mbye in November and a double release in December, "Pink Balloon/Sea Lions." Honey released on January 27, 2023 to positive reviews. When speaking about the album, Finnerty said "Optimism is the saddest thing in the world to me and I have a lot of it", referencing the dichotomy between sad and happy songs on the album.

On April 12, 2023, Finnerty released two singles, covers of the Yeah Yeah Yeahs' "Maps" and Porches' "Country".

On June 2, 2023, Finnerty was featured on a version of "The Weakness" by Ruston Kelly.

=== 2025–present: Bloodless ===
In January 2025, Finnerty released the single "Bovine Excision" from her third album, Bloodless. A second single "Lizard" was released in February 2025, with a double single "Hole In A Frame/Pants" following in March. Bloodless was released on April 25, 2025, via Grand Jury Music.

In the summer of 2025, the NPR Tiny Desk performance of "Pool" went viral on social media, spawning "quite literally hundreds of thousands of TikTok videos using the audio." Finnerty subsequently released a stripped version of "Pool" as a single and released the songs from her Tiny Desk performance as part of her album The Baby (5th Anniversary Edition), which also contained the entirety of The Baby and The Baby Reimagined.

On November 14, 2025, Finnerty released the concert album Bloodless Tour – Live From First Avenue.

Finnerty will open Role Model's Chuck On Tour in September and October 2026, touring several cities in the United States. She will serve as a supporting act on Gracie Abrams' The Look at My Life Tour in April and May 2027 for dates in France, Belgium, Ireland and the UK.

== Musical style and influences ==
Finnerty's musical style has typically been defined as indie-rock and indie-pop. She also incorporated elements of acoustic music, electronic music and standard rock music into her more recent material, according to AllMusic.

Finnerty states that her parents raised her as a feminist, and that it is a "deeply embedded part of her identity". However, she also states that feminist themes in her songwriting are not intentional, and that feminist ideals are inherently part of the female experience. She has criticized the labeling of her music as "feminist", stating: "A lot of the time, everything [women write] is categorized or reframed as empowerment, and I don’t often write from a place of empowerment. Usually, when I’m writing it’s from a place of desperation and pain.”

She has cited a range of musical influences including Lana Del Rey, FKA Twigs, The National, Nirvana, Elliott Smith, Lucinda Williams, Liz Phair, Father John Misty, Angel Olsen, and Brittany Howard.

== Personal life ==
Samia began her career in New York City's DIY scene, but moved to Nashville in 2021, where she lived for three years. After leaving Tennessee, Finnerty had a brief stint in her hometown of Los Angeles before moving to Minneapolis in December 2024, with Minnesota being a recurring topic in her music and an important location in the production of her first record The Baby. The move to Minneapolis placed her near long-time collaborators Hippo Campus and close friend singer-songwriter Raffaella.

She currently resides in New York City and is in a relationship with stand-up comedian Sasha von Didkovsky. She previously dated fellow musician Briston Maroney from 2021 to 2025, as well as actor Charlie Plummer around 2016 and 2017. Samia's main producer across all three of her records is Caleb Wright.

== Discography ==
=== Studio albums ===
Title	Details
The Baby	Released: August 28, 2020; Label: Grand Jury; Format: Digital download, streaming, vinyl, CD
Honey	Released: January 27, 2023; Label: Grand Jury; Format: Digital download, streaming, vinyl, CD, cassette
Bloodless	Releases: April 25, 2025; Label: Grand Jury; Format: Digital download, streaming, vinyl, CD

=== Remix albums ===
Title	Details
The Baby Reimagined	Released: January 15, 2021; Label: Grand Jury; Format: Digital download, streaming, vinyl, CD

=== Compilation albums ===
Title	Details
Before the Baby	Released: December 3, 2021; Label: Grand Jury; Format: Digital download, streaming, vinyl, CD

=== Extended plays ===
Title	Details
Scout	Released: July 23, 2021; Label: Grand Jury; Format: Digital download, streaming, vinyl, CD

=== Singles ===
List of singles, showing year released and album name
Title	Year	Peak chart positions	Album
Title	Year	US AAA	Album
"Welcome to Eden"	2017	—	Non-album singles
"Someone Tell the Boys"	2017	—	Non-album singles
"The Night Josh Tillman Listened to My Song"	2017	—	Non-album singles
"Django"	2018	—	Non-album singles
"21"	2018	—	Non-album singles
"Milk"	2018	—	Non-album singles
"Lasting Friend"	2019	—	Non-album singles
"Paris"	2019	—	Non-album singles
"Ode to Artifice"	2019	—	Non-album singles
"Never Said"	2019	—	Non-album singles
"Is There Something in the Movies?"	2020	—	The Baby
"Fit n Full"	2020	—	The Baby
"Big Wheel"	2020	—	The Baby
"Stellate"	2020	—	The Baby
"Triptych"	2020	—	The Baby
"Show Up"	2021	—	Scout
"As You Are"	2021	—	Scout
"Desperado"	2022	—	Non-album singles
"Born on a Train" (with Rachael Jenkins)	2022	—	Non-album singles
"Kill Her Freak Out"	2022	—	Honey
"Mad at Me" (with Papa Mbye)	2022	—	Honey
"Pink Balloon"	2022	—	Honey
"Sea Lions"	2022	—	Honey
"Breathing Song"	2023	—	Honey
"Honey"	2023	27	Honey
"Maps"	2023	—	Non-album singles
"Country"	2023	—	Non-album singles
"Making Breakfast"	2024	—	Grand Jury 10th Anniversary Covers
"Bovine Excision"	2025	31	Bloodless
"Lizard"	2025	—	Bloodless
"Hole In A Frame"	2025	—	Bloodless
"Pants"	2025	—	Bloodless
"Carousel"	2025	—	Bloodless
"Cinder Block"	2025	—	TBA

=== Other charted songs ===
Title	Year	Peak chart positions	Album
Title	Year	US AAA	Album
"Spine Oil"	2025	34	Bloodless

== Tours ==
=== Headlining ===
- Bloodless Tour (2025)
- Honey Tour (2023)
- Loving You Thanking You Tour (2021)

=== Supporting ===
- Gracie Abrams - The Look at My Life Tour (2027)
- Bleachers - From the Studio to the Stage (2024)
- Noah Kahan - Stick Season Tour (2023)
- Boygenius - The Tour (2023)
- Maggie Rogers - Feral Joy Tour (2022)
- Lucy Dacus - Home Video Tour (2022)
- Sylvan Esso - Shaking Out the Numb Tour (2021)
- Remo Drive - (2019)
- Donna Missal - This Time (2019)
- Hippo Campus - Bambi (2019)
- Active Bird Community - Amends (2018)
- AJR - What Everyone's Thinking Tour (2017)
