= The Baby (album) =

Studio album by Samia
- Released: August 28, 2020
- Studios: Lankershim Studios (Los Angeles); Kip's Place (Austin)
- Genres: Indie pop; indie rock
- Length: 36:13
- Label: Grand Jury
- Producers: Caleb Hinz; Jake Luppen; Nathan Stocker; Lars Stalfors

Samia chronology
The Baby (2020)	Scout (2021)

Singles from The Baby
- 1. "Is There Something in the Movies?" Released: April 29, 2020; 2. "Fit N Full" Released: June 24, 2020; 3. "Big Wheel" Released: July 22, 2020; 4. "Stellate" Released: July 22, 2020; 5. "Triptych" Released: August 25, 2020

Alternative cover
- The Baby Reimagined cover

The Baby is the debut studio album by American singer-songwriter Samia. It was released on August 28, 2020, via Grand Jury Music.

== Background ==
On April 29, 2020, Samia released the single "Is There Something in the Movies?" along with a music video that featured Maya Hawke and Charlie Plummer.

The album was announced on June 24, 2020, along with the second single "Fit N Full". "Big Wheel" and "Stellate" were released as a double single on July 22, 2020. "Triptych", the final single, was released on August 25, 2020.

On October 19, 2020, Samia released a full band version of "Is There Something in the Movies?". On November 18, 2020, Samia released a music video for "Waverly", which starred Nick Cianci, Ethan Cohen and Olivia Nikkanen.

=== The Baby Reimagined ===
On January 15, 2021, Samia released The Baby Reimagined, which consisted of covers and remixes of each of the songs from The Baby by fellow indie artists, including Palehound, Field Medic, Christian Lee Hutson, Briston Maroney and Bartees Strange among others.

== Critical reception ==
Professional ratings
Aggregate scores
Source	Rating
Metacritic	77/100
Review scores
Source	Rating
AllMusic	3/5 stars
The Line of Best Fit	8/10
musicOMH	4/5 stars
NME	4/5 stars
No Ripcord	8/10
Our Culture	4/5 stars
Paste	7.9/10
Pitchfork	7.9/10
Sputnikmusic	3.5/5 stars

The Baby received positive reviews upon its release. Pitchfork gave the album a 7.9 out of 10. Paste Magazine placed the album at number 43 on their list of the 50 Best Albums of 2020.

== Track listing ==
Side one
No.	Title	Writer(s)	Length
1.	"Pool"	Samia Finnerty; Nathan Stocker	4:29
2.	"Fit N Full"	Finnerty; Thomas D'Augustino	2:46
3.	"Big Wheel"	Finnerty; Lars Stalfors; Matthew Compton	3:15
4.	"Limbo Bitch"	Finnerty; Stalfors; Jake Luppen	3:20
5.	"Stellate"	Finnerty; Quinn McGovern; Caleb Hinz	4:09
6.	"Triptych"	Finnerty; McGovern	3:06

Side two
No.	Title	Writer(s)	Length
7.	"Does Not Heal"	Finnerty; McGovern; Sara Labriola; Stocker	2:58
8.	"Waverly"	Finnerty; Stalfors; Compton; Samuel Rosenstone	2:49
9.	"Winnebago"	Finnerty; Stalfors; Compton; Stocker	2:44
10.	"Minnesota"	Finnerty; Stalfors; Compton; Stocker	3:01
11.	"Is There Something in the Movies?"	Finnerty	3:30
Total length:			36:13

=== The Baby Reimagined ===
No.	Title	Writer(s)	Artist	Length
1.	"Is There Something in the Movies?"	Samia Finnerty	Briston Maroney	3:42
2.	"Minnesota"	Finnerty; Lars Stalfors; Matthew Compton; Nathan Stocker	MICHELLE	2:22
3.	"Winnebago"	Finnerty; Stalfors; Compton; Stocker	Charlie Hickey	2:37
4.	"Waverly"	Finnerty; Stalfors; Compton; Samuel Rosenstone	Anjimile	2:36
5.	"Does Not Heal"	Finnerty; Quinn McGovern; Sara Labriola; Stocker	Christian Lee Hutson	4:26
6.	"Triptych"	Finnerty; McGovern	Field Medic	3:03
7.	"Stellate"	Finnerty; McGovern; Caleb Hinz	Districts	4:40
8.	"Limbo Bitch"	Finnerty; Stalfors; Jake Luppen	Donna Missal	3:30
9.	"Big Wheel"	Finnerty; Stalfors; Compton	Palehound	3:20
10.	"Fit N Full"	Finnerty; Thomas D'Augustino	Remo Drive	2:54
11.	"Pool"	Finnerty; Stocker	Bartees Strange	3:27
Total length:				36:37

== Personnel ==
- Samia Finnerty – vocals, lyrics
- Caleb Hinz – production, engineering
- Jake Luppen – production
- Nathan Stocker – production, engineering
- Lars Stolfers – production, engineering, mixing at Lankershim Studios in Los Angeles, CA
- Joe LaPorta – mastering at Sterling Sound, New York, NY
- Aria Herbst – photography
- David Krammer – design
