= Lost World Caverns =

Caves and attraction near Lewisburg, West Virginia, US

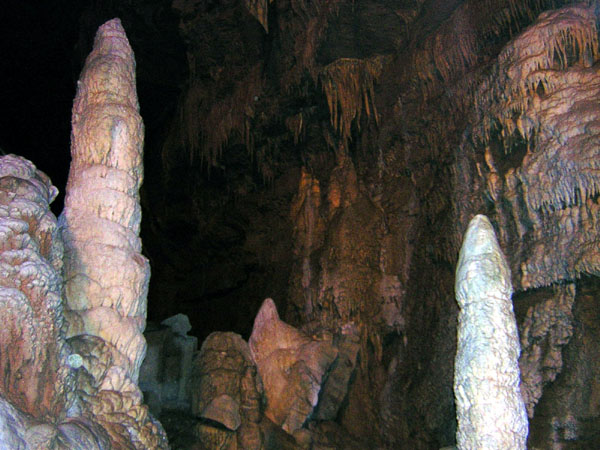
- Stalagmite and stalactite formations.

- Location within West Virginia Location within the United States
- Location: Lewisburg, West Virginia
- Coordinates: 37°49′57″N 80°26′49″W
- Designated: 1973
- Website: Official website

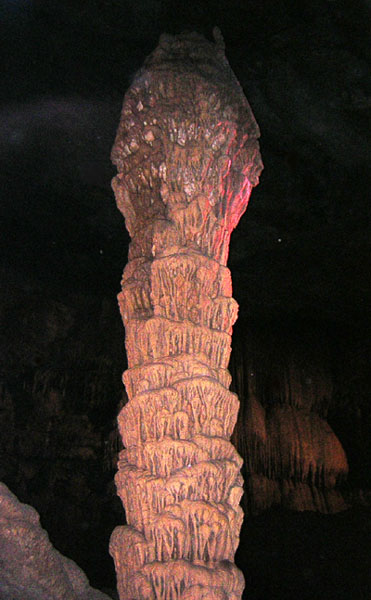
The "War Club" stalagmite formation at Lost World Caverns near Lewisburg, West Virginia

Lost World Caverns, located just outside Lewisburg, West Virginia, is an underground natural series of caverns. In November 1973, the caverns were registered as a National Natural Landmark as they "feature terraced pedestal-like stalagmites, flowstone, curtains, rimstone, domepits, and waterfalls."

== History ==
Originally named "Grapevine Cave", the only entrance was a long vertical drop into which farmers used to dump dead livestock and other trash. Virginia Polytechnic Institute and State University "discovered" the cave in 1942. It was surveyed in 1946 and in the 1960s and found to contain over a mile of interconnected passages that reach a depth of 245 feet below the surface. In 1967, the remains of a prehistoric cave bear (Arctodus pristinus) were unearthed in the cave.

In the early 1970s, a walking entrance was dug out, the trash was removed, walkways were installed and the cave was opened for tourism. In 1981, the gift shop and walking entrance were renovated. Since then subsequent owners have done extensive work on the lighting (making sure it does not allow the out-of-control growth of algae that old incandescent lamps cause) and many other cleaning and conservation projects as well as adding a dinosaur museum section to the gift shop.

In September 1971, Bob Addis set the unofficial World Record for "Stalagmite Sitting", staying atop the "Warclub" formation for 15 days, 23 hours, and 34 minutes with assistance from his "bucket man" Bob Leibman. The Greenbrier East Band provided in-cave fanfare for Addis's descent and shaky return to solid land from the top of the formation.

In 1992, the Weekly World News reported that Lost World Caverns was the home of "Bat Boy", and claimed that he was captured by the FBI in the caverns, where he reportedly survived by eating his weight in live insects every day.

In November 2021, musical group Sloppy Jane released their album Madison, which was entirely recorded within the cavern.

== Description ==
The "walking" tour section of the cave consists of a large chamber (1000 feet long, 300 feet wide, and 120 feet high) with many formations like the Bridal Veil, Goliath, Snowy Chandelier, Ice Cream Wall, Castle and, perhaps the most storied, the War Club, where Bob Addis made it into the Guinness Book of World Records by sitting atop the 28-foot formation for nearly 16 days. In addition to the "walking" tour, one can opt for a rougher guided "wild" tour through the remote sections of the cave, visiting sights like the Angel's Roost, Birth Canal, Keyhole, Glitter Pits, the Hall of the Mountain King and other passages and formations.

Lost World Caverns is a publicly accessible cave for those who want to experience and understand the karst topography within the Greenbrier River watershed. Environmental interests such as local schools and the Greenbrier River Watershed Association encourage the public to take educational tours in order to understand the unique relationship between surface water and groundwater. Surrounded by farmland on all sides, the cave interacts with a constant influx of air, water, clastic and other additives and pollutants. The cave system is part of Greenbrier County's karst plateau or "Great Savannah" where the average number of sinkholes are 18 per square kilometer.

There are wooden walkways and the option of wild caving in the deeper "wild" portions of the system. The cave drains into the Greenbrier River at Fort Spring through the Davis Spring, and there is much to be discovered about the underlying aquifers and science behind this drainage. The public tour section contains a stratum of hex (six-sided) stones. Cavers on the Wild Tour are asked to respect the encroaching threat of white nose syndrome in the Appalachian bat population, and perform sterilization protocols with their gear and clothing before they come in.

The site is open daily, except for holidays such as Thanksgiving, Christmas Day, and New Year's Day. As of December 2021, the standard self-guided tour rates are as follows: adults: $12, children 6–12: $6, under 6 free. If planning to visit, one should wear shoes with sufficient tread and dress for a temperature of 52 degrees F.

== Photo gallery ==
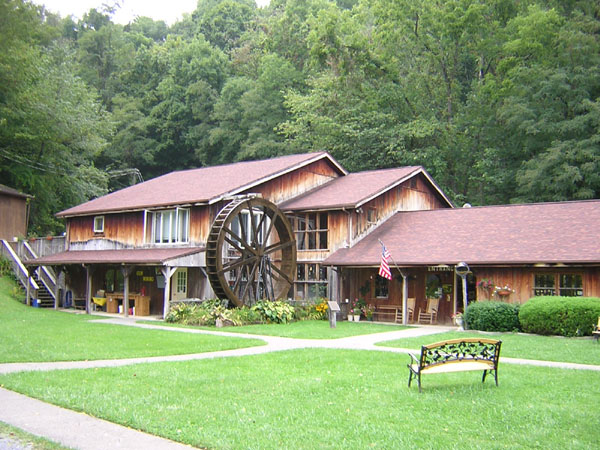
The building at Lost World Caverns

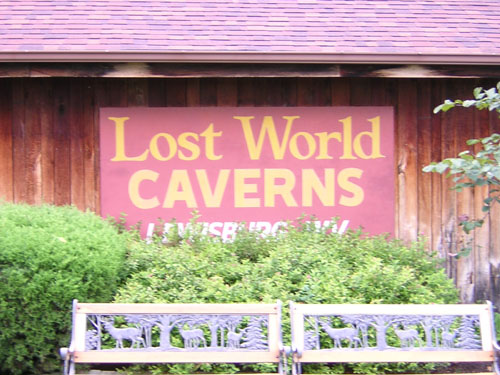
Sign on front of building

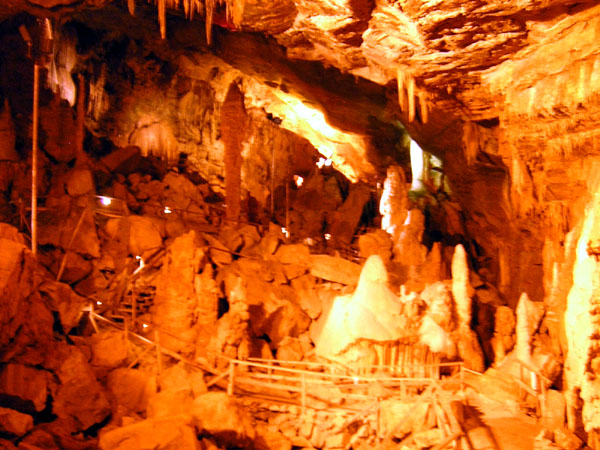
View inside large cavern chamber

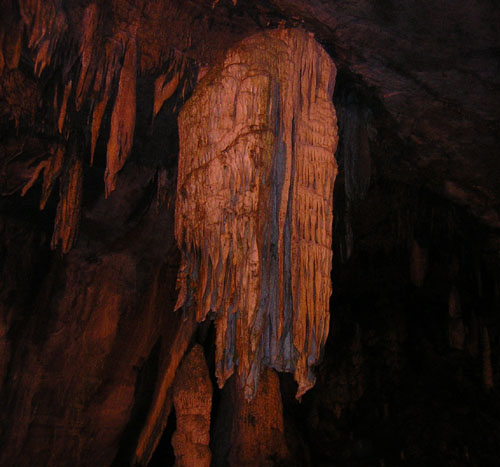
The "Snowy Chandelier" stalactite formation

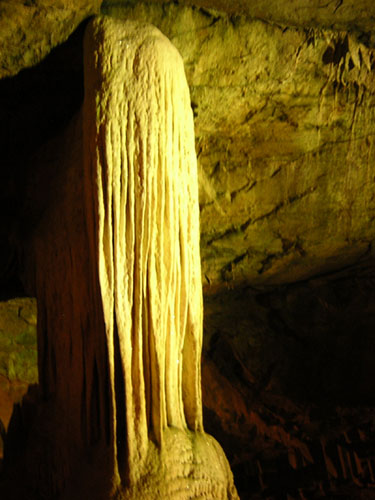
The "Bridal Veil" formation

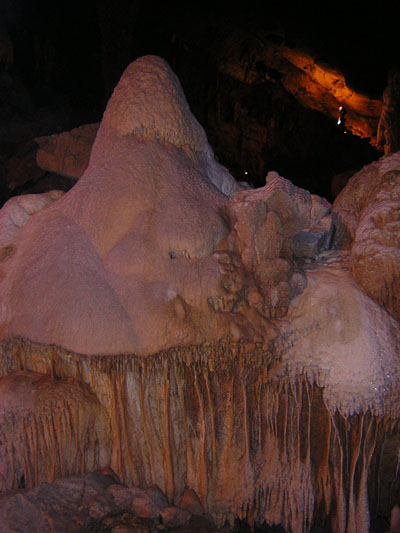
Stalagmite formation

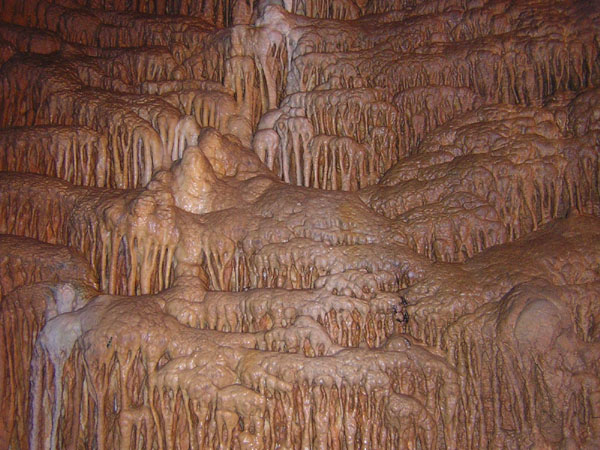
The "Ice Cream Wall" formation

== See also ==
- List of National Natural Landmarks
- List of National Natural Landmarks in West Virginia
