= Amends (disambiguation) =

Amends can refer to:

- "Amends", an episode of Buffy the Vampire Slayer
- Amends (album), an album by Grey Daze
- "Amends", an episode of Law & Order: Criminal Intent season 7
- "Amends", a song from Strange Little Birds by Garbage
- "Amends", a song from Herald by Odette
- Amends, an album by Active Bird Community
