= Bloodless =

Bloodless may refer to:

- Bloodless (album), 2025 album by American singer-songwriter Samia
- Bloodless surgery, a non-invasive surgical method developed
- Bloodless (video game), a 3D Realms game released in 2024
