= Nervous at Night =

2022 studio album by Charlie Hickey

Studio album by Charlie Hickey
- Released: May 20, 2022
- Genre: Rock
- Length: 38:03
- Label: Saddest Factory
- Producer: Marshall Vore

Professional ratings
Review scores
Source	Rating
DIY	3.5/5 stars
Dork	4/5 stars
The Line of Best Fit	8/10
Pitchfork	6.9/10

Nervous at Night is the debut studio album from American indie rock musician Charlie Hickey. The album was released on May 20, 2022, through Saddest Factory Records.

== Track listing ==
All tracks are written by Charlie Hickey.

Nervous at Night track listing
No.	Title	Length
1.	"Dandelions"	3:38
2.	"Gold Line"	3:43
3.	"Mid Air"	3:22
4.	"Thirteen"	3:08
5.	"Missing Years"	3:29
6.	"Every Time I Think"	2:47
7.	"Nervous At Night"	4:14
8.	"Springbreaker"	3:02
9.	"Choir Song (I Feel Dumb)"	3:38
10.	"Month of September"	3:50
11.	"Plant With Water"	3:07
Total length:		38:03
