= Claud (singer) =

American musician

- Also known as: Toast
- Born: April 23, 1999 (age 27); Highland Park, Illinois
- Origin: Chicago, Illinois
- Genre: Bedroom pop
- Occupation: Singer-songwriter
- Instruments: Vocals; guitar
- Years active: 2018–present
- Labels: Terrible; Saddest Factory; Dead Oceans

Claud Mintz, known professionally as Claud, is an American bedroom pop singer-songwriter from the suburbs of Chicago. Claud is non-binary and uses they/them pronouns. They are known for the songs "Soft Spot" and "Wish You Were Gay".

== Career ==
Claud began releasing music under the pseudonym Toast, releasing an EP in 2018. In 2019, they dropped out of college at Syracuse University to pursue music full-time. Claud released the EP Sideline Star on October 25, 2019. In 2020, they formed a new band with Clairo, Josh Mehling, and Noa Frances Getzug, called Shelly. The group released two songs on October 30, 2020, titled "Steeeam" and "Natural". That same year, Claud became the first artist to sign with Phoebe Bridgers' record label Saddest Factory Records.

Claud's debut album, Super Monster, was released on February 12, 2021. In October 2021 they played with Bleachers at their Austin City Limits show. Their single "Soft Spot" was included on Vogue's list of The 38 Best Songs of 2021. In 2023, they were featured on the track "To Be Yours" by EDM duo Odesza.

On May 2, 2023, Claud released the single "Every Fucking Time" and announced their second album, Supermodels, which was released on July 14, 2023. A Good Thing, from this album, was used in the season 3 finale episode of the Netflix series Heartstopper.

Their third album, Me and the Music was released on October 23, 2026. It was preceded by the singles "I Owe You" and "She Doesn't Love Me".

== Backing band ==
- Claud Mintz – lead vocals, guitar
- Molly Kirschenbaum – bass, guitar, backing vocals
- Francesca Impastato – drums, drum pad

== Discography ==
Claud discography
- Studio albums: 2
- EPs: 3
- Singles: 17

=== Studio albums ===
List of studio albums, with selected details
Title	Album details
Super Monster	Released: February 12, 2021; Label: Saddest Factory, Dead Oceans; Format: LP, CD, digital download, streaming
Supermodels	Released: July 14, 2023; Label: Saddest Factory, Dead Oceans; Format: LP, CD, cassette, digital download, streaming

=== Extended plays ===
List of extended plays, with selected details
Title	EP details
Toast (as Toast)	Released: 2018; Label: Terrible; Format: Digital download, streaming
Sideline Star	Released: October 25, 2019; Label: self-released; Format: CD, digital download, streaming
Gay and Bored	Released: April 2, 2020; Label: self-released; Format: Digital download, streaming

=== Singles ===
List of singles
Title	Year	Album
"Onetwothree"	2018	Toast
"Scarlett"	2018	Toast
"Never Meant to Call"	2018	Non-album singles
"Easy"	2019	Non-album singles
"If I Were You"	2019	Non-album singles
"Wish You Were Gay"	2019	Sideline Star
"Miss You"	2019	Sideline Star
"Want To"	2019	Sideline Star
"Seven Days a Week" (Demo)	2020	Non-album singles
"My Body" (with Del Water Gap)	2020	Non-album singles
"Wish U Were..."	2020	Non-album singles
"Gold"	2020	Super Monster
"Soft Spot"	2020	Super Monster
"Cuff Your Jeans"	2021	Super Monster
"Guard Down"	2021	Super Monster
"In or In-Between" (Remix) (with The Marías featuring Jesse)	2021	Non-album singles
"Tommy"	2021	Non-album singles
"Go Home"	2022	Non-album singles
"Every Fucking Time"	2023	Supermodels
