= Chris Hickey (singer-songwriter) =

American singer-songwriter

Chris Hickey is an American singer-songwriter from Los Angeles. He was a member of the punk-pop band The Spoilers, the folky trio Show of Hands (one of the first American bands to perform in China), and the alt folk rock band, Uma. He has six solo records and his voice and/or his songs have appeared on records by Sally Dworsky, Joe Henry, Michael Penn, Indigo Girls, Scott Seskind, Shannon Worrell, Phil Cody, Dean Stefan, and Craig Wisda.

Hickey has four children, one of whom is singer-songwriter Charlie Hickey. He was married to singer Sally Dworsky. He is a vegan and a Buddhist.

== Discography ==
| Record/Artist | Year/Label | Role |
|---|---|---|
| Welcome To Glassell Park EP by Chris Hickey | 2026 - Work-fire Recordings | solo record |
| Lost Dogs in the Courtyard by Chris Hickey | 2018 - Work-fire Recordings | solo record |
| Love Away by Chris Hickey | 2014 - Work-fire Recordings | solo record |
| Secondly by Show of Hands | 2013 - Randell Kirsch, Luann Olson, Chris Hickey | band member |
| Razzmatazz by Chris Hickey | 2009 - Work-fire Recordings | solo record |
| Release by Chris Hickey | 2003 - Work-fire Recordings | solo record |
| Fare Well by Uma | 1998 - Refuge / MCA Records | band member |
| Show of Hands by Show of Hands | 1989 - IRS / MCA Records | band member |
| Looking for Anything by Chris Hickey | 1987 - CNC Records | solo record |
| Frames of Mind, Boundaries of Time by Chris Hickey | 1985 - CNC Records | solo record |
| Reckless/Battling On (Single) by The Spoilers | 1980 - Rocket / MCA Records | band member |
| Greta/Loose Words (Single) by The Spoilers | 1980 - White Lunch Records | band member |
| The Spoilers (EP) | 1978 - White Lunch Records | band member |

Also appears on:

| Record/Artist | Year/Label | Role |
|---|---|---|
| This Day (single) by Sally Dworsky | 2020 - Sally Dworsky | songwriting |
| Electricland by Craig Wisda | 2009 - Retro Alternative Music | songwriting, select track |
| The Honey Guide by Shannon Worrell | 2008 - Dualtone Music Group | songwriting, select track |
| Boxes by Sally Dworsky | 2007 - Tikki Merm | songwriting (select tracks), guitar, background vocals |
| Civilians by Joe Henry | 2007 - ANTI | background vocals |
| Palms & Runes, Tarot & Tea: A Michael Penn Collection | 2007 - Sony Legacy | background vocals |
| Rarities by Indigo Girls | 2005 - Sony Records | background vocals |
| Types Of Ethical Theory by Craig Wisda | 2005 - Retro Alternative Music | songwriting, select track |
| Mad Dog Sessions by Phil Cody | 2002 - Tiny Head Records | background vocals |
| National Boulevard by Shrubbers | 1997 - Raj Records | background vocals |
| Free for All by Michael Penn | 1992 - RCA Records | background vocals |
| Deadicated: A Tribute to the Grateful Dead / Indigo Girls | 1991 - Arista Records | background vocals |
| KINK Live 1 - Various Artists | 1998 - KINK FM | with Uma - select track |
| Breakaway: The First Year by Various Artists | 1989 - Mountain Railroad | with Show of Hands - select track |
| Fast Folk Musical Magazine The: Vol. 4, #9: Los Angeles | 1989 - Folkways | with Show of Hands - select track |
| Trial and Error by Dean Stefan | 1987 - Rubber Tree Records | bass, guitar, bk vocals |
| Scott Seskind by Scott Seskind | 1985 - Scott Seskind | background vocals / scissors |
