= Super Monster =

Studio album by Claud
- Released: February 12, 2021
- Studio: Electric Lady, New York City, US
- Genre: Bedroom pop
- Length: 37:49
- Label: Saddest Factory; Dead Oceans

Claud chronology
Gay and Bored (2020)	Super Monster (2021)	Supermodels (2023)

Super Monster is the first studio album by American bedroom pop singer Claud, released on February 12, 2021, through Saddest Factory Records and Dead Oceans. It features guest appearances from Nick Hakim, Melanie Faye and Shelly. The album was the first release on Phoebe Bridgers's Saddest Factory Records and received positive reviews from critics, and charted in Scotland.

== Critical reception ==
Professional ratings
Aggregate scores
Source	Rating
AnyDecentMusic?	7.6/10
Metacritic	79/100
Review scores
Source	Rating
AllMusic	3/5 stars
Clash	9/10
DIY	3.5/5 stars
Exclaim!	8/10
Gigwise	7/10 stars
The Line of Best Fit	9/10
NME	4/5 stars
Under the Radar	7.5/10 stars

Super Monster received a score of 79 out of 100 on review aggregator Metacritic based on eight critics' reviews, indicating "generally favorable" reception. Marcy Donelson of AllMusic felt that "production touches like varied vocal distortion, warped and woozy delay, and the pull-tab sound effect on 'Pepsi' have the potential to keep listeners alternately hypnotized and playfully provoked" and concluded that Claud does not yet sound "like an artist fully formed", the album is "sweet and full of winsome promise". Megan Walder of Clash felt differently, stating that Super Monster arrived with "unwavering confidence as a complete concept; avoiding the risk of being a flippant debut and instead standing concrete thanks to Claud's clear vision".

DIY's Felix Rowe wrote that Claud's "brand of slick, understated pop could sit on a shelf alongside Haim, or Christine and the Queens" and the album "shows promise of a burgeoning artist finding their own voice". Harrison Smith of Gigwise described Super Monster as "loaded with non-conformist pop and touching personal narratives" and felt that its "demonstration of both adoration and observation of self-love comfortably invite the listener to do the same". Ian Gormely of Exclaim! summarized that the album "contains all the usual bedroom pop signifiers—light R&B grooves, chorus-drenched guitars à la Mac DeMarco" but that its "beats are crisp, the choruses pronounced and the hooks sharp", and called Super Monster a "roadmap for anyone hoping to keep to open the bedroom door to the world outside without losing the gauzy comfort of home".

Rachel Saywitz of The Line of Best Fit opined that the album "is able to find that beauty in love's most tragic moments, opening their heart to our ears as a healing gesture" and "the unique identity in each one of the 13 tracks is what makes it such a terrific and arresting listen". Mia Hughes of NME noted the album "is true to the all-embracing ethos of bedroom pop" and the "honesty and authenticity of [its] situations gives the album its emotional resonance, but Claud has the bona fide pop ear to back it up". Under the Radar's Andy von Pip concluded that Super Monster is "undoubtedly an impressive debut from an immensely talented singer/songwriter".

== Track listing ==
Super Monster track listing
No.	Title	Length
1.	"Overnight"	2:24
2.	"Gold"	3:19
3.	"Soft Spot"	3:08
4.	"In or In-Between"	3:32
5.	"Cuff Your Jeans"	2:55
6.	"Ana" (featuring Nick Hakim)	2:47
7.	"Guard Down"	3:26
8.	"This Town"	2:44
9.	"Jordan"	3:42
10.	"That's Mr. Bitch to You" (with Melanie Faye)	2:22
11.	"Pepsi"	2:50
12.	"Rocks at Your Window"	1:36
13.	"Falling with the Rain" (with Shelly)	3:04
Total length:		37:49

== Charts ==
Chart performance for Super Monster
Chart (2021)	Peak position
Scottish Albums (OCC)	56
UK Independent Albums (OCC)	22
