= Briston Maroney =

American singer and guitarist (born 1998)

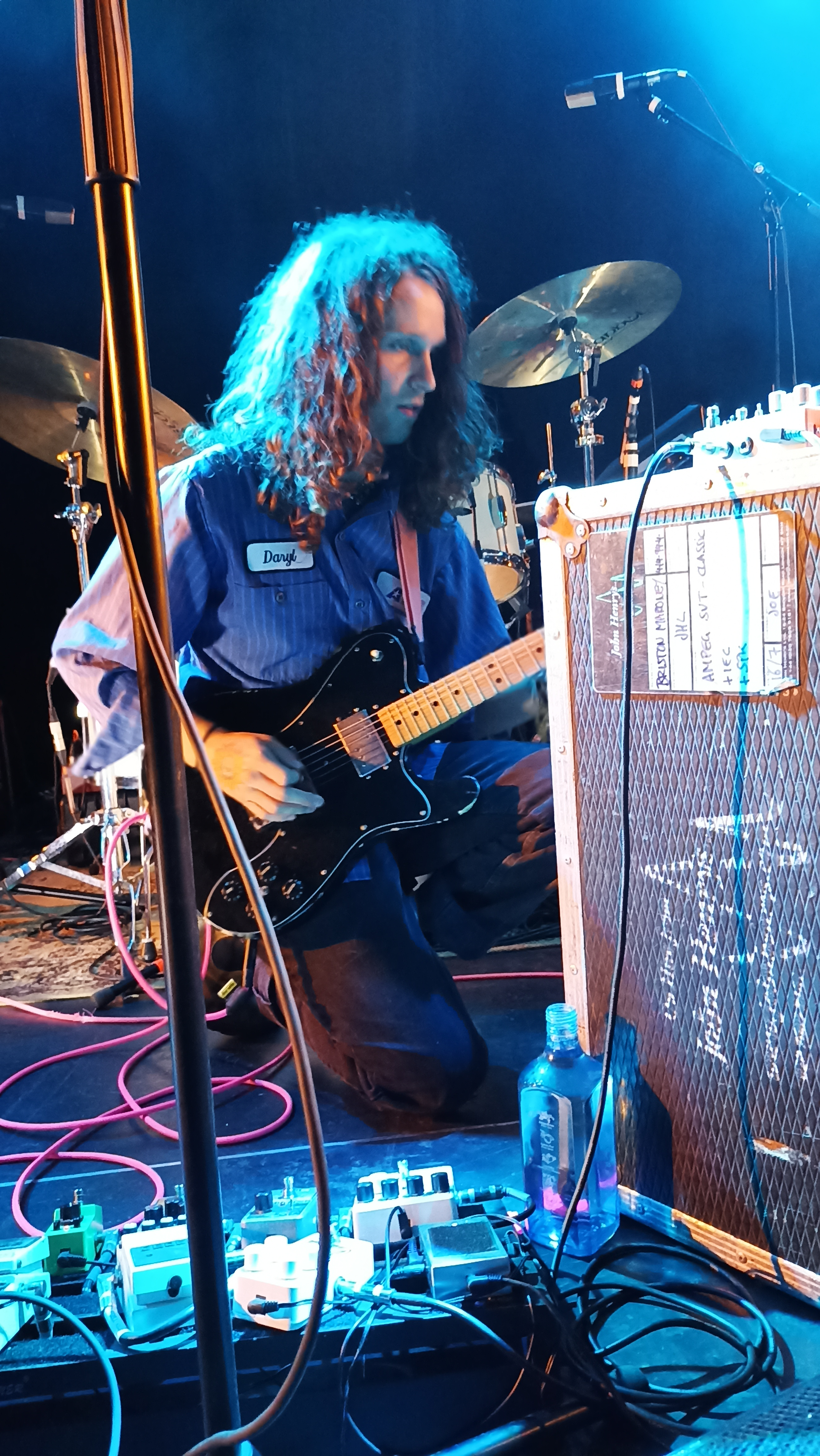
- Briston Maroney in July 2022.

Background information
- Born: Briston Lee Maroney; January 24, 1998 (age 28); Marietta, Georgia
- Origin: Knoxville, Tennessee
- Genres: Folk, rock
- Years active: 2013–present
- Labels: Canvasback Music; Atlantic
- Website: www.bristonmaroney.com

Briston Lee Maroney (born January 24, 1998) is an American singer, songwriter, and guitarist from Knoxville, Tennessee, who is signed to Canvasback Music and Atlantic Records. He has released three studio albums through Atlantic, including his most recent collection, Jimmy, released on May 2, 2025.

== Early life ==
Briston Maroney largely grew up in Knoxville, Tennessee. In August 2013, at age 15, Maroney tried out for the 13th season of American Idol at one of its audition bus stops in Knoxville. He was then selected to audition in front of the American Idol judges in Salt Lake City. There, he sang a version of The Rolling Stones' "You Can't Always Get What You Want" on an episode that aired in January 2014. The judges voted to advance him to Hollywood, where he became one of 30 semi-finalists. Maroney did not advance beyond that point.

Maroney sang and played guitar in the bluegrass band Subtle Clutch from 2013 to 2015. The band began busking on the street corners of Knoxville, and played venues such as Dollywood, the Square Room, and the WDVX Blue Plate Special, as well as music festivals such as Knoxville's Rhythm N' Blooms.

Maroney attended Lipscomb University in Nashville, Tennessee, where he studied music.

== Career ==
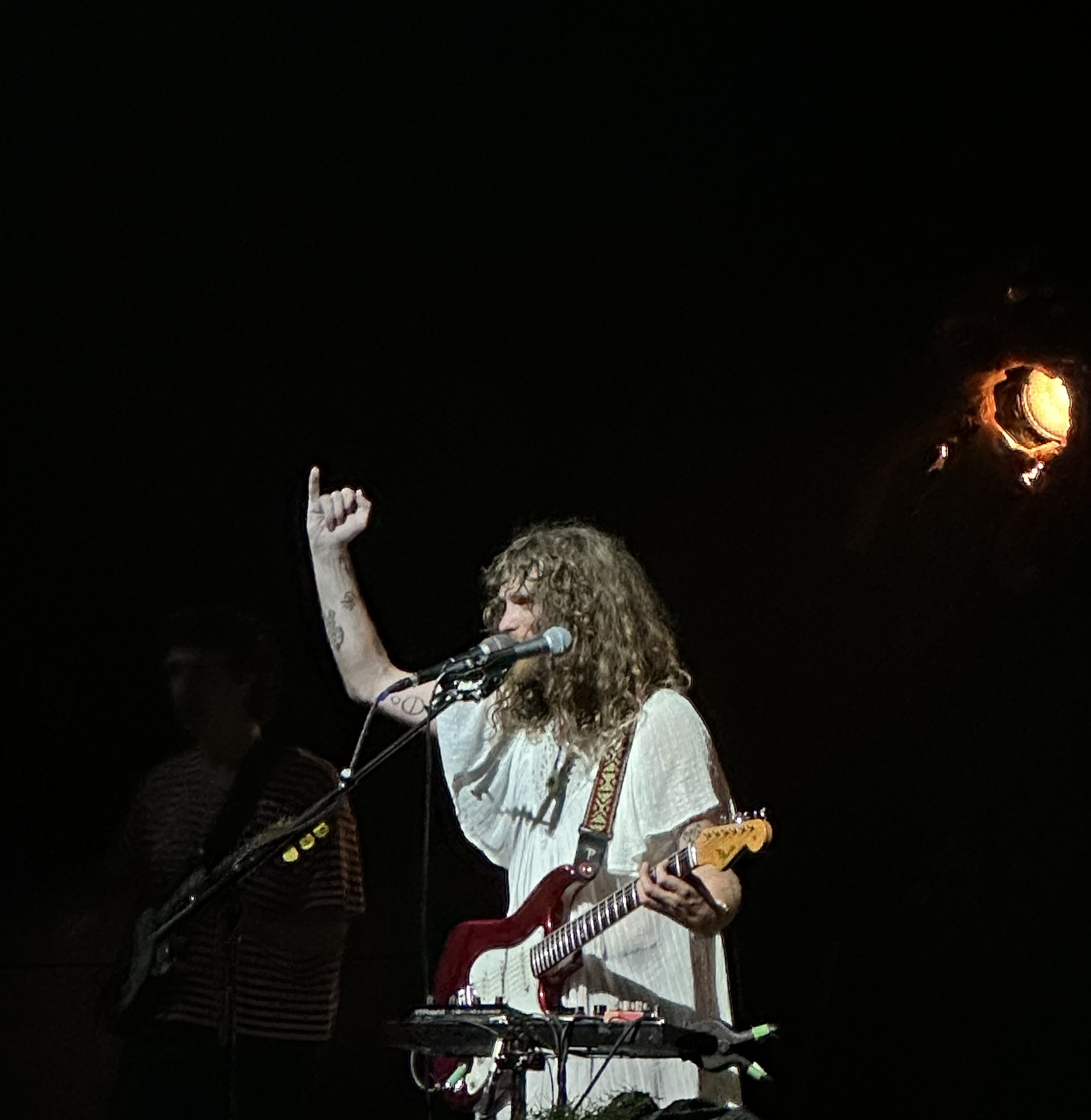
Maroney in concert, 2025

In 2015, he independently released his first EP, Reason to Shake.

In 2017, Maroney independently released an EP called Big Shot. In 2018, he began releasing new tracks, including "Under My Skin", "I've Been Waiting", and "Freakin' Out on the Interstate". Those songs all appeared on his first EP with Canvasback Music and Atlantic Records called Carnival, released in November 2018. "Freakin' Out on the Interstate" ended up being certified Gold by RIAA in 2021. In March 2019, Maroney made his first appearance at South by Southwest. He also opened for Liz Cooper & The Stampede and Wallows on their respective tours that year.

In May 2019, he released his second major label EP, Indiana, a collection of songs focusing on the change that came from his time spent living between Knoxville, California, and Florida, and ultimately his move to Nashville. Indiana featured the lead single "Caroline". Later that month, another song from the collection, "Fool's Gold", was featured on Taylor Swift's Apple Music "Playlist by ME!". A music video for that song was released the following month.

He performed at Austin City Limits Music Festival in October 2019.

Maroney cites John Prine, Bob Dylan, and Neil Young as some early influences. He has also expressed his appreciation for indie rock bands like Wallows, The Districts, and Illiterate Light, as well as current Americana acts such as Dogwood Tales, Jason Isbell, and Kacey Musgraves.

== Personal life ==
Maroney stated that, within the span of about a month in 2018, he dropped out of college, ended a relationship, and, thus, had to find a permanent place to stay and a stable job to work at. Despite being underage at that time, he went to rehab for about two months. He kept figuring out what to do with his life as he moved from Knoxville to California, from there to Florida, and from Florida back to Nashville, during which time he decided to keep pursuing a career in music. Between 2021 and 2025 he dated fellow musician Samia.

== Discography ==
=== Studio albums ===
List of studio albums with year released and selected album details
Title	Album details
Sunflower	Released: April 9, 2021; Label: Atlantic; Format: Digital download
Ultrapure	Released: September 22, 2023; Label: Atlantic; Format: Digital download
Jimmy	Released: May 2, 2025; Label: Atlantic; Format: Digital download

=== EPs ===
List of EPs with year released and selected album details
Title	Album details
Reason to Shake	Released: November 21, 2017; Label: Self-released; Format: Digital download
Big Shot	Released: December 8, 2017; Label: Self-released; Format: Digital download
Carnival	Released: November 16, 2018; Label: Canvasback/Atlantic; Format: Digital download
Indiana	Released: May 17, 2019; Label: Canvasback/Atlantic; Format: Digital download

=== Singles ===
List of singles with selected details
Title	Year	Album
"Under My Skin"	2018	Carnival
"Freakin' Out on the Interstate"	2018	Carnival
"Rose"	2019	Carnival
"Caroline"	2019	Indiana
"St. Augustine"	2019	Indiana
"Small Talk"	2019	Indiana
"Fool's Gold"	2019	Indiana
"Deep Sea Diver"	2020	Sunflower
"Freeway"	2020	Sunflower
"It's Still Cool If You Don't"	2021	Sunflower
"Sinkin'"	2021	Sunflower
"Bottle Rocket"	2021	Sunflower
"Why"	2021	Sunflower
"Rollercoaster"	2021	Sunflower
"Cinnamon"	2021	Sunflower
"The Kids"	2021	Sunflower
