= Supermodels (album) =

Studio album by Claud
- Released: July 14, 2023
- Length: 38:19
- Labels: Saddest Factory; Dead Oceans
- Producers: Alex Craig; Brad Hale; Bram Inscore; Claud Mintz; Dan Wilson; David Marinelli; Ethan Gruska; Mike Malchicoff; Valley Girl; Zach and Roger

Claud chronology
Super Monster (2021)	Supermodels (2023)	Me and the Music (2026)

Supermodels is the second studio album by American bedroom pop singer Claud, released on July 14, 2023, through Saddest Factory Records and Dead Oceans. The album was preceded by the lead single "Every Fucking Time". Claud will tour the UK and North America until October 2023 in support of the record.

== Background and recording ==
Claud recorded the album in their apartment using instruments that were already present, including their "out-of-tune guitar, and their equally wonky piano". It "deals with the universal trials of growing up" and "tracks Claud's journey from their childhood bedroom to their own apartment in New York City".

== Critical reception ==
Professional ratings
Aggregate scores
Source	Rating
AnyDecentMusic?	7.2/10
Metacritic	76/100
Review scores
Source	Rating
AllMusic	3.5/5 stars
DIY	4/5 stars
The Line of Best Fit	7/10
The Skinny	4/5 stars

Supermodels received a score of 79 out of 100 on review aggregator Metacritic based on five critics' reviews, indicating "generally favorable" reception. Alisa Wylie of The Skinny wrote that Supermodels "feels like a coming-of-age record, or perhaps, the soundtrack to your next favourite indie darling film" and felt that "while obviously contemporary, there's a nostalgic feel to some songs ('It's Not About You'; 'Wet'). They are laden with synth alongside Claud's dreamy vocals". Wylie concluded that Claud "combines humour with pure heart throughout, cultivating the ultimate soundtrack for summer and beyond". Louisa Dixon of DIY stated that it is "Claud's willingness to inject humour and playfulness into an ultimately ambitious record that makes Supermodels work", concluding that Claud "has not only found their voice, but knows just how to use it". The Line of Best Fit's Adele Julia found there to be "an essence of transformation that feels inescapable on the record", as if a change in Claud's life "wiped the rose-coloured smears from their outlook on the past". Julia wrote that although its "acoustic tonality may appear muddy, the confident voice of Supermodels reigns loud and clear". AllMusic's Marcy Donelson felt that the album "reassert[s] the knack for candid, conversational ruminations and compact pop hooks evident on their debut, but with plenty of variety in how they're expressed".

== Track listing ==
Supermodels track listing
No.	Title	Writer(s)	Producer(s)	Length
1.	"Crumbs"	Claud Mintz; Ethan Gruska	Gruska	2:10
2.	"Dirt"	Mintz; Bram Inscore	Inscore	3:11
3.	"A Good Thing"	Mintz; Dan Wilson	Mintz; Wilson; Zach and Roger	2:45
4.	"Every Fucking Time"	Mintz; Zachary Seman; Roger Kleinman	Zach and Roger	2:47
5.	"Wet"	Mintz; Seman; Kleinman	Zach and Roger	2:58
6.	"Glass Wall"	Mintz; Gruska; Inscore	Inscore	2:57
7.	"It's Not About You"	Mintz; Kyle Shearer; Nate Campany	Valley Girl	3:15
8.	"Paul Rudd"	Mintz	Mintz; Alex Craig; Mike Malchicoff	3:07
9.	"The Moving On"	Mintz; David Marinelli	Marinelli	3:10
10.	"Climbing Trees"	Mintz; Brad Hale	Hale	3:09
11.	"Spare Tire"	Mintz	Mintz	2:10
12.	"All Over"	Mintz	Mintz; Zach and Roger	3:09
13.	"Screwdriver"	Mintz	Mintz; Zach and Roger	3:31
Total length:				38:19

== Personnel ==
Musicians

- Claud Mintz – vocals (all tracks), guitar (tracks 2, 6, 8–12), bass guitar (5, 8, 12), keyboards (8), synthesizer (11)
- Ethan Gruska – guitar, synthesizer, vocals (1)
- Bram Inscore – bass guitar (2, 6), guitar (2), programming (2, 6), synthesizer (2, 6)
- Dan Wilson – bass guitar, guitar (3)
- Aaron Sterling – drums, percussion (3)
- Sara Mulford – piano, synthesizer, vocals (3)
- Roger Kleinman – guitar (4, 5, 13)
- Mike Riddleburger – drums (4, 13), percussion (13)
- Zachary Seman – programming (5), keyboards (12)
- Mikey Freedom Hart – synthesizer (5, 11), guitar (12)
- Nate Campany – guitar (7)
- Kyle Shearer – programming (7)
- Alex Craig – guitar (8)
- David Marinelli – piano, programming (9)
- Brad Hale – keyboards, programming (10)
- Tani Khan – guitar (11)
- Seth Paris – saxophone (12, 13); drums, horn (12); clarinet (13)

Technical

- Dave Cooley – mastering
- Tony Hoffer – mixing
- Sara Mulford – engineering (3, 11, 13)
- Seth Paris – engineering (4)

Visuals

- Angela Ricciardi – creative direction, photography
- Silken Weinberg – creative direction, photography
- Miles Johnson – design
- Alexa Terfloth – layout
