= Madison (album) =

Studio album by Sloppy Jane
- Released: November 5, 2021
- Recorded: October 2019
- Studio: Lost World Caverns
- Genres: Chamber pop; orchestral pop; avant-garde
- Length: 48:46
- Labels: Saddest Factory; Dead Oceans
- Producers: Haley Dahl; Mika Lungulov Klotz; Al Nardo; Jack Wetmore

Sloppy Jane chronology
Willow (2018)	Madison (2021)

Singles from Madison
- 1. "Party Anthem" Released: September 9, 2021; 2. "Jesus and Your Living Room Floor" Released: October 6, 2021

Professional ratings
Review scores
Source	Rating
AllMusic	3.5/5 stars
Pitchfork	7.5/10

Madison is the second studio album by American band Sloppy Jane. It was released on November 5, 2021, by Saddest Factory and Dead Oceans. The album features a 21-piece orchestra recorded 200 feet below the earth in Lost World Caverns. It was preceded by two singles, "Party Anthem" and "Jesus and Your Living Room Floor".

Madison was listed as the 44th best album of 2021 by Gorilla vs. Bear.

== Background ==
Haley Dahl first conceived of the album in 2017 and it took her two years touring over thirty caves to find the right acoustics for the project. It is a concept album revolving around "exploring fantasy relationships". Recorded in Lost World Caverns in West Virginia, the album was originally intended to be recorded on the Great Stalacpipe Organ, but Dahl could not receive permission to use it, so she recorded in a different cave. While the performers played in the cave, engineer Ryan Howe had to record the album in a car 90 feet above, since the humidity of the cavern would ruin the sound equipment. The entirety of the album was recorded over a two-week period in October 2019, with sessions lasting from 3 P.M. to dawn.

== Track listing ==
All tracks are written by Haley Dahl, except for tracks 2 and 8 written by Dahl and Bailey Wollowitz.

Madison track listing
No.	Title	Length
1.	"Overture"	3:44
2.	"Party Anthem"	3:21
3.	"Jesus and Your Living Room Floor"	7:49
4.	"Judy's Bedroom"	2:25
5.	"Bianca Castafiore"	1:32
6.	"Lullaby Formica"	4:28
7.	"Madison"	6:18
8.	"Wilt"	3:18
9.	"Wonderama"	2:37
10.	"The Constable"	9:34
11.	"Epilogue"	3:58
Total length:		48:46

== Personnel ==
Credits taken from Discogs.

=== Musicians ===
- Haley Dahl – vocals, bass, guitar, piano, conductor
- Claudius Agrippa – violin
- Sean Brennan – cello
- Maria Caputo – additional conductor
- Wesley Coleman – viola
- Lily Desmond – violin
- Lindsay Dobbs – trombone
- Joshua Gerrard – viola
- Jake Hardwick – trumpet
- Odetta Hartman – violin
- Huxley Kuhlmann – violin
- Abby Lim-Kimmberg – harp
- Kira McSpice – cello
- Al Nardo – electric guitar, xylophone
- Victor Pacek – tuba
- Lily Rothman – flute
- Joseph Sutkwoski – guitar
- Von Kolk – flute
- Jack Wetmore – bass, guitar
- Bailey Wollowitz – drums, percussion, slide guitar
- Choir:
  - Haley Dahl
  - Veronica Bianqui
  - Lily Desmond
  - Nicolette Miller
  - Al Nardo
  - Lily Rothman
  - Von Kolk
  - Bailey Wollowitz

=== Technical ===
- Haley Dahl – producer
- Sean Brennan – additional production, musical direction, score editor
- Maria Caputo – piano tuner
- Ryan Howe – engineer
- Joel Jerome – engineer
- Mika Lungulov-Klotz – producer
- Al Nardo – producer
- Ruben Radlauer – engineer
- Lily Rothman – additional production
- Hayden Ticehurst – assistant engineer
- Jack Wetmore – producer, assistant engineer
- Bailey Wollowitz – additional production

=== Artwork ===
- Mika Lungulov-Klotz – cover art and sleeve photo
- Walter Wlodarczyk – sleeve photo
