= Scruffpuppie =

American musician

Scruffpuppie is the stage name of American indie rock musician Jodi Shubert.

== History ==
Shubert was born and raised in Paris, Texas before moving to Wisconsin. Shubert began her career self-releasing an album titled Zombie Boy in 2018 on Bandcamp. The following year, Shubert released her second album, also through Bandcamp titled Never Coming Home. In 2021, Shubert signed to Phoebe Bridgers record label Saddest Factory Records. In October 2021, it was revealed through a Billboard profile on the Saddest Factory Records label that Shubert was preparing to release a new album. In November 2021, Shubert announced her third full-length album and first for Saddest Factory Records, titled Letters To Nobody, would be coming in January 2022. which was to include a collaboration with Bridgers. However, shortly after the announcement of Shubert's debut album, she was dropped from the label after they reported "seeing evidence of very disturbing behaviour". Despite this, Shubert still self-released the album.
