= Saddest Factory Records =

American record label

Saddest Factory Records was an American record label that was founded on October 5, 2020, by Phoebe Bridgers. The label operated as an imprint of Dead Oceans, before merging into the label in June 2026 following a trademark dispute. Artists signed to the label include Sloppy Jane, Muna, Claud, and Charlie Hickey.

== History ==
After releasing her second album, Punisher, Phoebe Bridgers founded Saddest Factory Records on October 5, 2020. The label's name, "Saddest Factory", was first coined on twitter by Phoebe Bridgers' former bandmate, Haley Dahl of Sloppy Jane. The name comes from a mispronunciation of the word "satisfactory", a word frequently used in record contracts. The label was founded as an imprint of Dead Oceans, and the first artist to be signed to the label was Claud. On May 19, 2021, Muna became the second artist to be signed to the label. Charlie Hickey was the third artist to be signed to the label, with a remake of "Seeing Things", featuring Muna, being released in celebration. Musician Scruffpuppie had previously been signed in August 2021 before being subsequently dropped in December 2021 following allegations of inappropriate behavior.

In June 2026, the imprint was merged into its parent label Dead Oceans following a trademark dispute.

== Roster ==
=== Former artists ===
- Charlie Hickey (2021-2026)
- Claud (2020-2026)
- Katie Gavin (2024-2026)
- Muna (2021-2026)
- Scruffpuppie (2021-2021)
- Sloppy Jane (2021-2026)
- Jasmine.4.T (2024-2026)

== Discography ==
- Claud – Super Monster (2021)
- Sloppy Jane – Madison (2021)
- Charlie Hickey – Nervous at Night (2022)
- Muna – Muna (2022)
- Claud – Supermodels (2023)
- Katie Gavin – What a Relief (2024)
- Jasmine.4.T - You Are the Morning (2025)
