= Sally Dworsky =

American singer

- Born: Sally Gail Dworsky; Saint Paul, Minnesota, U.S.
- Genres: Alt-rock, folk rock, movie soundtracks
- Occupation: Singer
- Instrument(s): Vocals, guitar
- Years active: 1989–present
- Spouse: Chris Hickey

Sally Dworsky is an American singer-songwriter and playback singer in animated films. In addition to her solo work and co-fronting the alt-rock band Uma, Dworsky served as the singing voice for lead characters in iconic animated films including The Lion King and The Prince of Egypt, both of which won the Academy Award for Best Original Song – as well as Shrek. She has also recorded or performed with R.E.M., Peter Gabriel, Bonnie Raitt, Neil Diamond and many others.

== Early life ==
Dworsky was born Sally Gail Dworsky to Robert and Shirley (née Shure) Dworsky, and grew up in St. Paul, Minnesota. She has one sister, Rabbi Susan Dworsky, and two brothers, pianist Richard Dworsky and former lawyer turned drummer and author Alan Dworsky.

== Career ==
In Minnesota, she was a member of the bands Moore by Four and Players. In Moore by Four, her voice was described as "sparkling", "marvelous separately – together [with band members], they're dynamite." She also appeared in lead roles in musicals at the Mixed Blood Theatre in Minneapolis.

After moving to California, where she appeared in a featured role in the Los Angeles production of Les Misérables, she toured with Don Henley as a back-up singer, and was noted by a reviewer for a "strong solo" in "Sunset Grill". She also sang back-up vocals in the studio, and on stage, for artists including R.E.M., Peter Gabriel, Bonnie Raitt, Shelby Lynne, Teddy Thompson, Rodney Crowell, Midge Ure, Ringo Starr, and many others.

She began singing in films including leading roles in The Lion King, The Prince of Egypt, and Shrek. As the singing voice of Nala in The Lion King, she sang part of "Can You Feel the Love Tonight", which won the 1995 Academy Award for Best Original Song. One of the songs she recorded for The Prince of Egypt (in the role of Miriam) was "When You Believe" (in a duet with Michelle Pfeiffer), which won the 1999 Academy Award for Best Original Song. One reviewer wrote about the song, which was also recorded and released by Mariah Carey and Whitney Houston, "the film version of the song will move you in a wholly good way ... singers Sally Dworsky and Michelle Pfeiffer convey the hope and amazement every living Hebrew must have felt at hearing Pharaoh's own emancipation proclamation."

In the early 1990s, she gave her first solo performances, in the Twin Cities and in Los Angeles, and in 1995 released a solo EP, Habit Trail., produced by Jay Joyce. Dworsky has also performed on A Prairie Home Companion.

Dworsky joined the group Uma (Chris Hickey and Andy Kamman) and they signed a record deal with producer Don Gehman's label Refuge, an MCA affiliate. They released the album Fare Well in 1997 and toured throughout the U.S. and Canada with artists such as Jonatha Brooke and Chris Whitley. Dworsky released Start It All Over Again, an album of covers, with her brother Richard Dworsky in 2006 and followed up in 2008 with Boxes, an album of original songs. She has since released two singles, Same Room in 2018 and This Day in 2020, both produced by Marshall Vore.

== Personal life ==
Dworsky was married to singer-songwriter Chris Hickey. They have fraternal boy-girl twins, daughter Lila, and son singer-songwriter Charlie Hickey (b. September 28, 1999).

== Discography ==
=== Soundtracks ===
- The Lion King: Original Motion Picture Soundtrack – Walt Disney Records (1994)
- The Prince Of Egypt Soundtrack – DreamWorks (1998)
- Disney's Greatest Vol. 3 – Walt Disney Records (2003)
- Disney Princess: The Ultimate Song Collection – Walt Disney Records (2004)
- The Magic of Disney – Walt Disney Records (2009)
- Best of the Lion King – Walt Disney Records (2011)
- Walt Disney Records The Legacy Collection: The Lion King – Walt Disney Records (2011)

=== Solo ===
- Habit Trail – Sally Dworsky (1996)
- Start It All Over Again – Sally Dworsky and Richard Dworsky (2006)
- Boxes – Sally Dworsky (2008)
- Same Room – Sally Dworsky (2018)
- This Day – Sally Dworsky (2020)

=== Uma ===
- Fare Well – Uma (Chris Hickey, Sally Dworsky, Andy Kamman) (1997)

== Filmography and TV appearances ==
- 1989 – The Wizard – song "I Found My Way"
- 1992 – The Cutting Edge – song "Turning Circles"
- 1994 – The Lion King – Adult Nala (singing voice)
- 1997 – The End of Violence – songwriter, Bad News, performed by Eels
- 1998 – Mulan – Young Bride (singing voice)
- 1998 – The Prince of Egypt – Miriam (singing voice)
- 2001 – Shrek – Princess Fiona (singing voice)
- 2014 – A to Z (TV Series, Ep 4) – song "There Will Be a Light"
- 2018 – Transparent (TV series) appeared in episode
- 2022 – The Patient (TV series) appeared in episode

== Awards and recognition ==
- 1996, 1997 – ASCAP award-winner, most-performed songs, with "That's as Close as I'll Get to Loving You"
