= Dogwood Tales =

American alternative country band

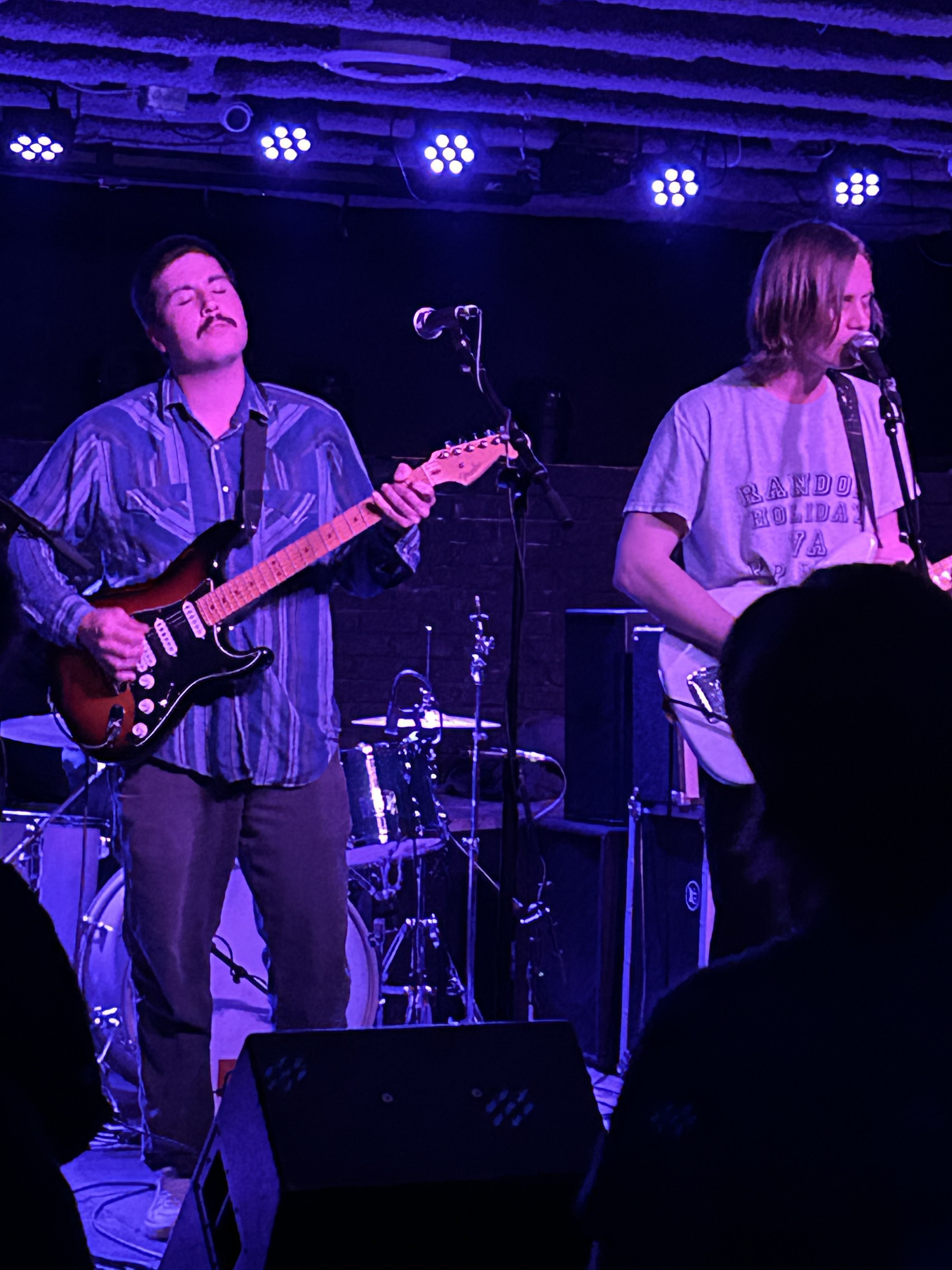
Dogwood Tales performing in Charlottesville, Virginia

Dogwood Tales is an alternative country band from Harrisonburg, Virginia. Ben Ryan and Kyle Grim began the band as a duo in 2016. After releasing their first album, Dogwood Tales expanded with members Jake Golibart, Danny Gibney, and Stephen Kuester on the drums, bass, and pedal steel. The band has performed with other acts such as Illiterate Light, Palmyra, Euphoria Again, and Sam Burchfield. In 2025, Dogwood Tales performed at Newport Folk Festival in Rhode Island.

== Discography ==
=== Albums ===
- Too Hard to Tell (2018)
- Closest Thing to Heaven (2020)
- Destination Heaven (Euphoria Again and Dogwood Tales) (2026)
- Every Star in Rockingham County (2026)

=== EPs ===
- 13 Summers 13 Falls (2022)
- Rodeo (2023)
- Sending (2024)

=== Singles ===
- Waiting on the Sun (2018)
- Too Hard to Tell (2018)
- Living in a Shadow (2018)
- Riding Horses/ There Goes the Light (2019)
- The Traitor (2019)
- Truck Stop Town (2020)
- Hold You Again (2022)
- 25 (2022)
- Stranger (2023)
- driver's side fantasy (2024)
- dream (2024)
- Electric Lines (2025)
