= Sloppy Jane =

American avant- rock band

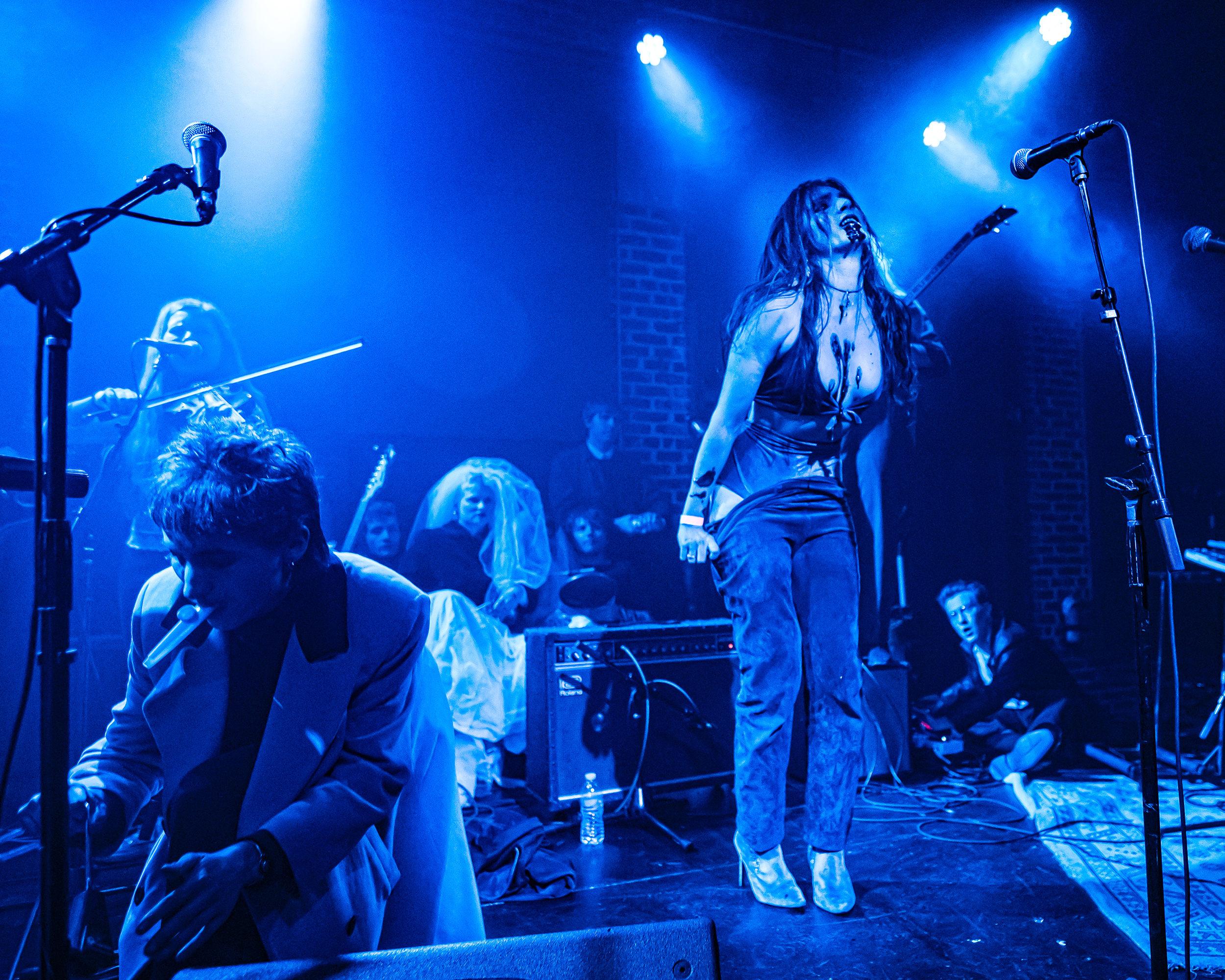
- Sloppy Jane at the Bootleg Theater in Los Angeles in 2019

Background information
- Origin: Los Angeles, California
- Genres: Punk rock; avant-punk; avant-rock; post-punk; chamber pop
- Years active: 2009–present
- Labels: Lolipop; Saddest Factory; Dead Oceans
- Members: Haley Dahl; Kim Sollecito; Lily Reszi Rothman; Lily Desmond; Sean Brennan; Nathan Lopez; Isabella Bustanoby; Fern Perera; Khalil Long; Ruby Wang
- Past members: Al Nardo; Noor Al-Samarrai; Avishag Cohen-Rodriguez; Joseph Sutkwoski; Jack Wetmore; Phoebe Bridgers; Imogen Teasley-Vlautin; Ember Knight; Sara Catherine

Sloppy Jane is an American avant garde/rock band fronted by Haley Dahl based in Brooklyn, New York. The band released their breakthrough second studio album, Madison, in 2021, through Saddest Factory Records, an imprint owned by their former bassist Phoebe Bridgers. Dahl is known for her eccentric performance art style, which used to include nudity.

== Career ==
=== Early career (2009–2015) ===
Haley Dahl was born in 1995 in New York City and raised in Los Angeles. It was in the latter city that she formed Sloppy Jane at the age of fifteen, performing up and down the Sunset Strip. As an experiment she wore one suit for an entire year without washing it, vowing to wear it until it "rots off her body" and now intends to eat it.

In 2014, Sloppy Jane released two demos, Totally Limbless and Burger Radio, with the line-up of Haley Dahl on lead vocals and guitar, Phoebe Bridgers on bass and background vocals, and Imogen Teasley-Vlautin on drums. They released their debut extended play, Sure-Tuff, on July 14, 2015 through Lolipop Records. This release saw the addition of Sara Catherine on guitar. Sure-Tuff was inspired by both post-punk and proto-punk music.

=== Willow (2017–2019) ===
Their debut studio album, Willow, was self-released on March 23, 2018. For this album Sloppy Jane was a duo, with Dahl performing vocals, guitar, piano, and bass, and Sara Catherine playing drums as well as additional guitar and vocals. This album was recorded in Los Angeles. Willow also featured non-members Charlene Huang and April Guthrie on violin and cello respectively. Musically, it is an art rock and punk rock album that "reflected a shift toward more playful, theatrical songs involving instruments like glockenspiel and flexatone, spoken word samples, and crowd noise". Following its release, Dahl moved back to her hometown of New York City. Starting in 2017 Dahl had ambitions of recording in a cave. Because of this, she started spelunking in 2019, looking for a cave that had the right acoustics and would be willing to let her record.

=== Madison (2020–present) ===
On September 9, 2021 Sloppy Jane signed to Phoebe Bridgers' Saddest Factory Records, as Bridgers was the band's former bassist. Their second studio album, Madison, was released on November 5 of the same year. Madison had two release shows where the album was played in full, one in Brooklyn on November 7, 2021 and one in Los Angeles on December 3, 2021. Following these performances the band opened for Iceage in February and March 2022. The band then played South by Southwest on March 16 for the saddestfactory showcase and opened for a few shows on Phoebe Bridgers’ tour in May. Sloppy Jane then went on their Madison Tour October and November 2022. These shows were black-tie required.

For the one-year anniversary of Madison the band released the 7” vinyl “My Misery Will Bury You” featuring two versions of “Wilt”, the Madison version and a cover done by Phoebe Bridgers in 2015. Following the year of touring, Dahl moved to Cerro Gordo, an abandoned mining town in the Owens Valley near Lone Pine, California. Dahl, along with other members of the mining town project, has ambitions of building a recording studio in the town for musicians to use. On April 17, Haley Dahl announced on the Sloppy Jane Instagram page they would be selling a limited amount of autographed Madison vinyl, and for an extra fee, a lyric of the buyer’s choice written with the autograph. They went on sale April 18, and sold out that day.

In 2023 Sloppy Jane released a full visual album of Madison featuring eight new music videos to accompany the three already existing ones ("Party Anthem", "Jesus and Your Living Room Floor", and "Wilt"). The film was directed by Mika Lungulov-Klotz. The music video for Bianca Castafiore was produced by Lyssa Current and directed by Lungulov-Klotz. The film featured Haley Dahl as the Main, and John Ennis as "The Tooth Fairy" (who played the same character in the music video for "Mindy" from the album Willow), along with other uncredited actors and musicians.

The Madison Visual Album premiered on May 19 at the Spectacle Theater in Brooklyn, New York. With the premiere, there was a Q&A with Haley Dahl and Lungulov-Klotz. The Visual Album premiered digitally on May 22 on Sloppy Jane’s YouTube channel.

In the 2024 film I Saw the TV Glow, Sloppy Jane appeared with Phoebe Bridgers, performing "Claw Machine".

== Members ==
=== Rotating live members ===
- Haley Dahl – lead vocals, guitar, piano, bass (2014–present)
- Lily Reszi Rothman – keyboards, flute, guitar, vocals (2018–present)
- Lily Desmond – violin, vocals (2018–present)
- Ruby Wang – violin (2018–present)
- Sean Brennan – cello (2019–present)
- Nicolette Miller – vocals (2019–present)
- Nathan Lopez – guitar, glockenspiel (2021–present)
- Jackie Cohen – vocals (2021–present)
- Abby Lim-Kimberg – harp, vocals (2021–present)
- Isabella Bustanoby – viola, bass, vocals (2021–present)
- Raina Bock – bass (2022–present)
- Fern Perera – violin (2022–present)
- Khalil Long – trumpet (2022–present)
- Kim Sollecito – drums (2024–present)

=== Past members ===
- Bailey Wollowitz – drums, trumpet, synths, percussion, guitar, vocals (2017–2022)
- Al Nardo – guitar, glockenspiel, drums, vocals (2017–2021)
- Emma Stacher – bass, vocals (2019–2021)
- Noor Al-Samarrai – background vocals (2018–2019)
- Avishag Cohen-Rodriguez – guitar (2019)
- Joseph Sutkwoski – guitar (2019)
- Jack Wetmore – bass (2019), guitar (2018–2019)
- Tamar Jusidman – background vocals (2018–2019)
- Katie Vreeland – bass (2017–2019)
- Phoebe Bridgers – bass, background vocals (2014–2015)
- Imogen Teasley-Vlautin – drums, background vocals (2014–2015)
- Sara Catherine – guitar, drums, guitar, background vocals (2015–2018)
- Ember Knight – bass, background vocals (2017–2019)

== Discography ==
Sloppy Jane discography
- Studio albums: 2
- EPs: 2
- Singles: 3
- Music videos: 19
- Demo albums: 2

=== Studio albums ===
Title	Details
Willow	Released: March 23, 2018; Label: Self-released; Format: LP, digital download, streaming
Madison	Released: November 5, 2021; Label: Saddest Factory, Dead Oceans; Format: LP, CD, digital download, streaming

=== Demo albums ===
Title	Details
Totally Limbless	Released: January 24, 2014; Label: self-released; Format: Digital download
Burger Radio	Released: May 21, 2014; Label: self-released; Format: Digital download

=== Extended plays ===
Title	Details
Sure-Tuff	Released: July 14, 2015; Label: Lolipop; Format: Cassette, digital download, streaming
Jam in the Van (Live Session)	Released: March 30, 2018; Label: Jam in the Van; Format: Digital download, streaming

=== Singles ===
Title	Year	Peak chart positions	Album
Title	Year	UK Phys.	Album
"Party Anthem"	2021	–	Madison
"Jesus and Your Living Room Floor"	2021		Madison
"Wilt"	2021		Madison
"My Misery Will Bury You" (featuring Phoebe Bridgers)	2022	19	Non-album single
"Claw Machine" (featuring Phoebe Bridgers)	2024	–	I Saw the TV Glow soundtrack

=== Music videos ===
Title	Year	Album
"Aunt Rosie's Garden"	2016	Sure-Tuff
"Mindy"	2017	Willow
"La Cluster"	2017	Willow
"Potassium"	2018	Willow
"Kitchen Store"	2018	Willow
"Bark Like a God"	2018	Willow
"In the Future It Was Me That Burned It Down"	2019	Willow
"King Mitis"	2019	Willow
"Party Anthem"	2021	Madison
"Jesus and Your Living Room Floor"	2021	Madison
"Wilt"	2021	Madison
"Overture"	2023	Madison
"Judy's Bedroom"	2023	Madison
"Bianca Castafiore"	2023	Madison
"Lullaby Formica"	2023	Madison
"Madison"	2023	Madison
"Wonderama"	2023	Madison
"The Constable"	2023	Madison
"Epilogue"	2023	Madison
