= Active Bird Community =

American indie rock band (2005–2020)

- Origin: Brooklyn, New York, US
- Genres: Indie rock; slacker rock
- Years active: 2005–2020
- Label: Barsuk
- Members: Andrew Wolfson; Quinn McGovern; Tom D'Agustino; Zach Slater
- Website: activebirdcommunityband.com

Active Bird Community (also known as ABC) was an indie rock band from Brooklyn, New York. Forming in 2005, when its members at the time were 11 years old, they released four albums from 2012 to 2018. They disbanded in 2020. Their music has been compared to artists such as The Crocketts and Radiohead.

== Career ==
Active Bird Community, often abbreviated as ABC, formed in 2005, when its members at the time – Tom D'Agustino, Andrew Wolfs, and Zach Slater – were 11 years old. Their drummer, Quinn McGovern, joined during college when a previous drummer left the band; he was introduced to the band in his freshman year after the crowd shouted for Active Bird Community during his own band's concert.

ABC released their first album, Magnum Opus, in 2012. In 2015, ABC released the album I've Been Going Swimming. A single from the album, "Pick Me Apart", received a music video in July 2016. The band's next album, Stick Around, was released in 2017.

After signing to Barsuk, ABC released the album Amends on October 26, 2018. It received mostly positive reviews from magazines such as The Line of Best Fit, PopMatters, and Loud and Quiet.

ABC disbanded in 2020, after running a fundraiser for a follow-up to Amends. The money was used to fund D'Agustino's first solo EP, Homeschool: Book I, under the name Homeschool. According to DJ Connor of Ones to Watch, D'Agustino was "happily unhappy" with their time in ABC.

== Musical style ==
ABC was an indie rock band, although they have also been described as indie pop. PopMatters described Amends as sounding like the alternative rock bands of the mid-1990s. Their music is considered punk by Billboard, who called Stick Around "a scrappy punk slugfest" and compared it to "a punk version of Vitamin C's 'Graduation (Friends Forever)'". Clash described "Sweaty Lake" as slacker rock and guitar pop. ABC's overall sound has been compared to The Crocketts, Manchester Orchestra, Radiohead, and Car Seat Headrest.

== Members ==
- Andrew Wolfs (vocals, guitar)
- Quinn McGovern (drums)
- Tom D'Agustino (vocals, guitar)
- Zach Slater (bass)

== Discography ==
Adapted from Spotify and Bandcamp.

=== Albums ===
- Magnum Opus (2012)
- I've Been Going Swimming (2015)
- Stick Around (2017)
- Amends (2018)

=== EPs ===
- Drive Like Your Kids Live Here (2012)
- Active Bird Community (2015)
- Active Bird Community on Audiotree Live (2017)

=== Singles ===
- "Mooncalf" (2014)
- "After Party" (2014)
- "Astrophobia / Eidolon" (2014)
- "Pick Me Apart" (2015)
- "Longport" (2016)
- "Qb Sneak" (2016)
- "Newbie" (2016)
- "Dead Legs" (2016)
- "Spend the Night" (2018)
- "Somewhere" (2019, with Samia)
