= Bloodless (album) =

2025 studio album by American musician Samia

Studio album by Samia
- Released: April 25, 2025
- Studio: Betty's (Durham, North Carolina
- Genres: Pop; indie rock
- Length: 40:26
- Label: Grand Jury
- Producers: Caleb Wright; Jake Luppen

Samia chronology
| Honey (2023) | Bloodless (2025) |

Singles from Bloodless
- 1. "Bovine Excision" Released: January 14, 2025; 2. "Lizard" Released: February 18, 2025; 3. "Hole in a Frame" Released: March 25, 2025; 4. "Pants" Released: March 25, 2025; 5. "Carousel" Released: April 22, 2025

Bloodless is the third studio album by American singer-songwriter and musician Samia. It was released on April 25, 2025, by Grand Jury Music in vinyl, CD and digital formats. It features five singles released between January and March 2025, titled "Bovine Excision", "Lizard", "Hole in a Frame", "Pants", and "Carousel".

== Background ==
On January 27, 2023, Samia released her second studio album Honey to critical acclaim. The Guardian's five star review characterised the album as "raw, deliciously sad indie-rock". NME praised Honey as "a wise and wilting record about that painful part of coming of age where you have to figure out how to stay alive with all the fears you haven't grown out of".

== Writing ==
Writing for Bloodless began in March 2023 when Finnerty had begun formulating poems that would eventually evolve into Bloodless songs. Songs would begin as poems with Finnerty then taking to the piano to find their melodies. This approach to writing Bloodless was similar to what she did with her debut album The Baby. Her previous work Honey had been created quickly which was not the case with Bloodless. Finnerty stated she wanted to be "fastidious in the craftsmanship of it".

In conceptualizing the album, Finnerty initially thought about historical muses like Kiki de Montparnasse, an early 20th century French model who featured in the surrealist paintings of Man Ray. Her writing, however, changed course as Finnerty increasingly wrote about her own perception by the world. Finnerty thought about how she appears to men as a woman and how she self-edited her personality to fit with male projections of her. Finnerty engaged with the work of feminist and gender studies scholar Judith Butler on social conditioning. The title Bloodless came from the phenomenon of cattle mutilation where farmers would find their cattle drained of blood with their mouths and genitals surgically removed. Finnerty saw emptied-out cattle carcasses as emblematic of her experience of womanhood. Fascinated by the bloodless killing and hollowing out of livestock, Samia wrote "Bovine Excision" in January 2024 about "bloodless cattle mutilation as a metaphor for self-extraction" she performs as a woman towards men. Finnerty was entrigued with documentary series Unsolved Mysteries as it told stories whose meaning comes from being unsolved with the bovine excision phenomenon being a form of unsolved mystery.

"Hole in a Frame" was written about the hole in the wall punched by Sid Vicious at Cain's Ballroom in Tulsa following the Sex Pistols performance there in January 1978. The hole was framed and put on display at Cain's. After viewing the framed hole herself, Finnerty began to think about the power of absence.

== Recording ==
Samia took a recording trip to North Carolina in August 2023 that proved to be pivotal in formulating the Americana feel of her third album. Breaking from Honey's pop-forward approach, Finnerty cited Fiona Apple, Morphine, Björk, Mitski and Neil Young as influences on Bloodless. Bloodless was recorded in 2024 between Sylvan Esso's recording studio Betty's in Durham, North Carolina and Jake Lupppen's studio in Minneapolis, Minnesota, where Samia lives. The album was mixed by Alex Farrar and Caleb Wright and mastered by Dave Trumfio. The LP lacquer was cut by Jeff Powell at Sam Phillips Recording Studio in Memphis.

== Promotion ==
=== Singles ===
On January 7, 2025, Finnerty announced that the first single from the album to be released would be "Bovine Excision" on January 14. Its music video directed by Sarah Ritter. Bloodless was announced alongside the release of "Bovine Excision".

"Lizard" was released as the second single on February 18, 2025. Finnerty said the track is about "wanting to live up to the person I became in someone's head". Clash called it a "melodically beautiful" track that "attempts to pin down some intense emotions".

"Hole in a Frame" and "Pants" were released as a double A-side single on March 25. Finnerty released the two tracks simultaneously "because they capture opposite instincts" with "Hole in a Frame" dealing with "a fascination with disappearing and the power of absence" while "Pants" is about "accepting a non-refundable self". Flood Magazine called "Hole In A Frame" a "pleasant folk-pop track equal parts intimate and enchanting" while album closer "Pants" is "a buzzing anthem that slowly builds into a shape-shifting odyssey incorporating a number of different styles".

"Carousel" was released on April 22 as the final single to precede the album's release on April 25.

=== Tour ===
| Date (2025) | City | Country | Venue | Supporting Act |
|---|---|---|---|---|
| April 25 | Brighton | United Kingdom | Resident | —N/a |
| April 26 | Bristol | United Kingdom | Rough Trade | —N/a |
| April 28 | Liverpool | United Kingdom | Rough Trade | —N/a |
| April 29 | Leeds | United Kingdom | Jumbo | —N/a |
| April 30 | Nottingham | United Kingdom | Rough Trade | —N/a |
| May 1 | London | United Kingdom | Rough Trade East | —N/a |
| May 20 | Portland, Maine | United States | Portland House of Music | —N/a |
| May 21 | Boston | United States | House of Blues | Raffaella |
| May 22 | Northampton, Massachusetts | United States | Academy of Music | Raffaella |
| May 24 | Toronto | Canada | The Opera House | Raffaella |
| May 25 | Montreal | Canada | Le Studio TD | Raffaella |
| May 26 | Burlington, Vermont | United States | Higher Ground | Raffaella |
| May 28 | Philadelphia | United States | Theatre of Living Arts | Raffaella |
| May 30 | New York City | United States | Brooklyn Steel | Hank Heaven |
| May 31 | Washington, D.C. | United States | 9:30 Club | Raffaella |
| June 3 | Chicago | United States | Thalia Hall | Raffaella |
| June 5 | Milwaukee | United States | Turner Hall | Raffaella |
| June 6 | Minneapolis | United States | First Avenue | Raffaella |
| June 7 | Kansas City | United States | The Truman | Raffaella |
| September 8 | Atlanta | United States | Terminal West | Hank Heaven |
| September 9 | Birmingham | United States | Saturn | Hank Heaven |
| September 11 | Dallas | United States | The Echo Lounge | Hank Heaven |
| September 12 | Austin | United States | Scoot Inn | Hank Heaven |
| September 13 | Arlington Heights | United States | The Theater at Forest View Educational Center | Hank Heaven |
| September 16 | Phoenix | United States | Crescent Ballroom | Hank Heaven |
| September 17 | San Diego | United States | Music Box | Hank Heaven |
| September 19 | Los Angeles | United States | Fonda Theatre | Renny Conti |
| September 20 | San Francisco | United States | The Fillmore | Renny Conti |
| September 22 | Portland | United States | Wonder Ballroom | Renny Conti |
| September 23 | Vancouver | Canada | Hollywood | Renny Conti |
| September 24 | Seattle | United States | Neptune Theatre | Renny Conti |
| September 26 | Salt Lake City | United States | Soundwell | Renny Conti |
| September 27 | Denver | United States | Ogden | Renny Conti |
| September 29 | Omaha | United States | Waiting Room | Renny Conti |
| September 30 | St. Louis | United States | Delmar Hall | Renny Conti |
| October 1 | Nashville | United States | Brooklyn Bowl | Renny Conti |

== Reception ==
Professional ratings
Aggregate scores
| Source | Rating |
|---|---|
| AnyDecentMusic? | 8.3/10 |
| Metacritic | 78/100 |
Review scores
| Source | Rating |
| AllMusic | 2.5/5 stars |
| Clash | 8/10 stars |
| DIY | 4.5/5 stars |
| Dork | 5/5 stars |
| Exclaim! | 8/10 stars |
| NME | 5/5 stars |
| Paste | 8.8/10 |
| Slant | 4/5 stars |
| Under the Radar | 8.5/10 |
| Pitchfork | 7.0/10 |

Bloodless received favorable critical reception from multiple publications. At Metacritic, which assigns a normalized rating out of 100 to reviews from mainstream critics, the album received an average score of 78 based on twelve reviews, indicating "generally favorable reviews". Indie music website Stereogum referred to Bloodless as "an album that suggests the more you think you've got her pinned down, the more she'll surprise you," and British culture website NME remarked, "Impressively, though, Samia sorts Bloodless into something that not only keeps it together but thrives on its complexities and intricacies."

AllMusic described the album as "a record that takes a similarly diverse approach to style – country-rock, ambient pop, indie rock, singer/songwriter folk, and more – but instead often plops several of them into the same song, with curious results."

It was described as "Samia's most fleshed-out project with all of her components" by Dork Magazine, and "a gruesome, precise, and poetic act of self-surgery" by Slant Magazine. DIY Magazine gave the album a rating of four and a half stars, and noted about the production, that it "mostly takes a no-frills approach, often just vocal and acoustic guitar lending itself to the album's overall message; if you give less of yourself, you'll appear bigger."

Paste described Bloodless as "both wayward and painfully sharp, its songs potent with matter-of-fact lines that cut to the heart of it all without ever spelling anything out," and Under the Radar referred to it as "angrier, stranger, and more ambitious—less a diary and more a myth, refracted through elliptical metaphors, religious allusions, and a theatrical distance that skillfully enhances the album's raw intimacy," in comparison with Samia's 2023 album, Honey. On a ten-point scale, Paste, Under the Radar, Clash and Exclaim! each gave the album a rating between eight and nine.

== Track listing ==
Bloodless track listing
| No. | Title | Writer(s) | Length |
|---|---|---|---|
| 1. | "Biscuits Intro" | Samia Finnerty | 0:14 |
| 2. | "Bovine Excision" | Finnerty; Jake Luppen; Christian Lee Hutson | 2:53 |
| 3. | "Hole in a Frame" | Finnerty; Raffaella Meloni | 3:03 |
| 4. | "Lizard" | Finnerty; Caleb Wright; Luppen; Meloni | 3:20 |
| 5. | "Dare" | Finnerty; Wright | 3:21 |
| 6. | "Fair Game" | Finnerty; Luppen; Meloni | 2:32 |
| 7. | "Spine Oil" | Finnerty; Wright; Luppen; Meloni | 3:23 |
| 8. | "Craziest Person" | Finnerty; Luppen; Wright | 1:05 |
| 9. | "Sacred" | Finnerty; Meloni; Luppen | 2:38 |
| 10. | "Carousel" | Finnerty; Quinn McGovern | 3:34 |
| 11. | "Proof" | Finnerty | 4:14 |
| 12. | "North Poles" | Finnerty; Wright; Luppen; Meloni | 4:01 |
| 13. | "Pants" | Finnerty; Wright; Luppen; Meloni | 6:03 |
| Total length: | | | 40:32 |

=== Bloodless Tour - Live From First Avenue ===
Bloodless Tour - Live From First Avenue is a live album from the Bloodless tour released on November 14, 2025. It was recorded on June 6, 2025 at First Avenue in Minneapolis.

Bloodless Tour - Live From First Avenue track listing
| No. | Title | Writer(s) | Length |
|---|---|---|---|
| 1. | "Triptych" | Samia Finnerty; Quinn McGovern | 4:20 |
| 2. | "Dare" | Finnerty; Caleb Wright | 3:41 |
| 3. | "Fair Game" | Finnerty; Jake Luppen; Raffaella Meloni | 2:56 |
| 4. | "Scared" | Finnerty; Meloni; Luppen | 3:05 |
| 5. | "Bovine Excision" | Finnerty; Luppen; Christian Lee Hutson | 3:09 |
| 6. | "Proof" | Finnerty | 4:23 |
| 7. | "Carousel" | Finnerty; McGovern | 3:38 |
| 8. | "Hole in a Frame" | Finnerty; Meloni | 3:06 |
| 9. | "Big Wheel" | Finnerty; Lars Stalfors; Matthew Compton | 3:20 |
| 10. | "Kill Her Freak Out" | Finnerty | 4:00 |
| 11. | "Spine Oil" | Finnerty; Wright; Luppen; Meloni | 3:29 |
| 12. | "Craziest Person" | Finnerty; Luppen; Wright | 1:15 |
| 13. | "Lizard" | Finnerty; Wright; Luppen; Meloni | 3:37 |
| 14. | "North Poles" | Finnerty; Wright; Luppen; Meloni | 4:24 |
| 15. | "Fit N Full" | Finnerty; Thomas D'Augustino | 3:14 |
| 16. | "Pants" | Finnerty; Wright; Luppen; Meloni | 4:25 |
| 17. | "Biscuits" | Finnerty | 2:16 |
| 18. | "Pool" | Finnerty; Nathan Stocker | 4:10 |
| 19. | "Is There Something in the Movies?" | Finnerty | 4:49 |
| 20. | "Honey" | Finnerty; Wright | 3:27 |
| Total length: | | | 70:44 |

== Personnel ==
Credits for Bloodless adapted from Bandcamp

- Caleb Wright – producer, mixing
- Jake Luppen – producer
- Brett Bullion – engineer
- Whistler Allen – engineer
- Alex Farrar – mixing (track 10)
- Dave Trumfio – mastering
- David Kramer – artwork

== Charts ==
Chart performance for Bloodless
| Chart (2025) | Peak position |
|---|---|
| Scottish Albums (Official Charts) | 91 |
