= Field Medic =

American lo-fi musician

- Born: Kevin Patrick Sullivan; May 2, 1991 (age 35)
- Origin: San Francisco, California
- Genres: Indie folk; freak folk; lo-fi; emo-folk
- Years active: 2009–present
- Labels: Run for Cover; Sunroom Records & Salon
- Website: fieldmedic.net/

Field Medic is the stage name of American indie folk musician Kevin Patrick Sullivan.

== History ==
Sullivan began releasing music with his older brother Sean in 2009, initially as Westwood & Willow and then with drummer Andrew Skewes-Cox as Rin Tin Tiger. He debuted as Field Medic with his first EP titled Crushed Pennies. In 2015, he released his first full-length album, Light Is Gone. In 2017, he released an EP titled If I Shout That the Revolutions in My Blind Heart Have Left Me on the Mend, Would I Still Have to Surrender to the Tides to Exorcise This Possession? on Bandcamp. Also in 2017, Sullivan signed to Run for Cover Records and released his first album on the label, Songs from the Sunroom. Sullivan's song "Do a Little Dope" was featured on Alternative Press's "20 songs you need to hear this week" list. In 2020, Sullivan also began releasing songs under the alter ego Paper Rose Haiku. His album Dope Girl Chronicles was released on December 1, 2023.

Field Medic was featured on a Green Day tribute album singing the song "2000 Light Years Away".

== Discography ==
=== Albums ===
- Light Is Gone (2015)
- Songs from the Sunroom (2017)
- Fade into the Dawn (2019)
- Floral Prince (2020)
- Grow Your Hair Long If You're Wanting to See Something That You Can Change (2022)
- Light Is Gone 2 (2023)
- Dope Girl Chronicles (2023)
- Boundless & True (2024)
- Surrender Instead (2025)

=== EPs ===
- Crushed Pennies (self-released, 2013)
- Fuck You Grim Reaper (self-released, 2014)
- Me, My Gibberish, & the Moon (self-released, 2015)
- Pegasus Thotz (self-released, 2015)
- That Beer Called Becks Reminds Me of a Haiku I Wrote (self-released, 2016)
- If I Shout That the Revolutions in My Blind Heart Have Left Me on the Mend, Would I Still Have to Surrender to the Tides to Exorcise This Possession? (self-released, 2017)
- Boy from My Dream (Run for Cover, 2018)
- Little Place (self-released, 2018)
- Plunge Deep Golden Knife (self-released, 2021)
