= Illiterate Light =

American Rock Band

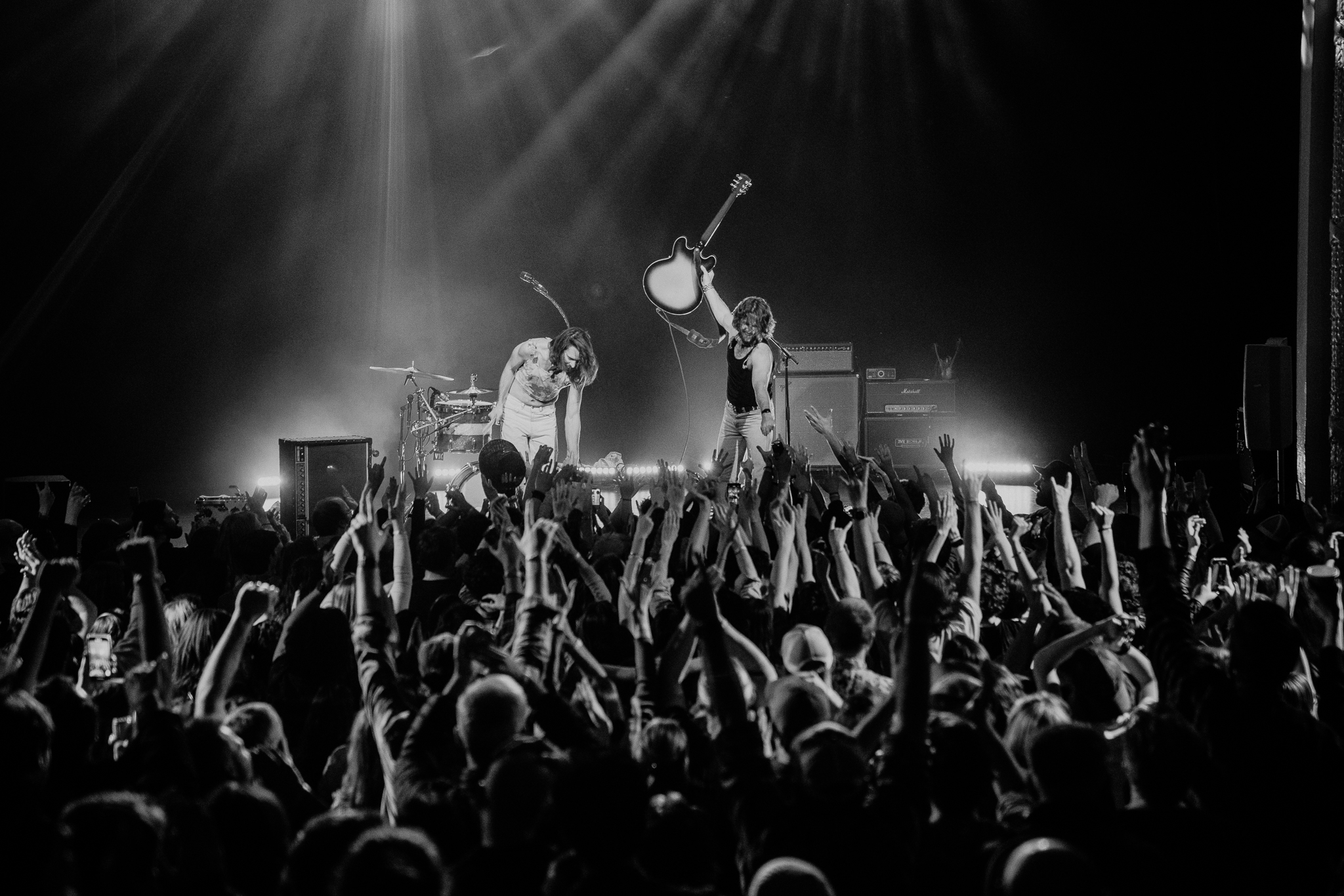
- Illiterate Light Performing Live in Charlottesville, VA

Background information
- Origin: Harrisonburg, Virginia, U.S.
- Genres: Indie rock; Alternative Rock; Folk; Americana
- Years active: 2015–present
- Labels: Thirty Tigers; Red Book Records; Atlantic Records
- Members: Jeff Gorman; Jake Cochran
- Website: illiteratelight.com

Illiterate Light is an American alternative rock duo formed in Harrisonburg, Virginia, in 2015. The band consists of Jeff Gorman (vocals, guitar, synth bass) and Jake Cochran (drums, vocals). They have attained a following due to their intense touring and dynamic live show. They have an unconventional live performance style and sound, which the Washington Post describes as "Massive." Cochran plays a standing drum kit and is one of the few drummers to crowd surf, and Gorman plays a Moog Synthesizer with his feet while singing, playing guitar, and headbanging. The band does not perform to backing tracks.

The band's sound is rooted in rock and Americana, although they also incorporate folk and psychedelic elements into their songwriting. Their debut album Illiterate Light was released in October 2019 on Atlantic Records. After the Covid-19 pandemic ended, their sophomore album Sunburned was released in January 2023 by Thirty Tigers. Sunburned was named "one of the best albums of 2023" by SPIN magazine. The Nashville Scene wrote of them, "No other band currently touring, let alone any duo, brings to the stage the same amount of passion and energy as this group, and no other band in recent memory can create such an enormous and incredibly engrossing sound with only two instruments."

== History ==
Illiterate Light was formed in 2015 by Jeff Gorman and Jake Cochran. Gorman’s first instrument is the drum kit, also played by his uncle Steve Gorman of The Black Crowes. In an interview with Premier Guitar Gorman noted, "The first song that I taught myself was Down by the River by Neil Young." Gorman and Cochran met in 2010 while attending James Madison University in Harrisonburg, VA. They formed their first band Money Cannot Be Eaten in 2011 and disbanded in 2013 after another band member quit. It was during this time that the two managed an organic farm together in Singers Glen, VA. They also spent each summer touring by bicycle with a group of other local artists and activists. Bicycles have remained an important part of their career as they now run a bicycle powered stage at Newport Folk Festival each summer.

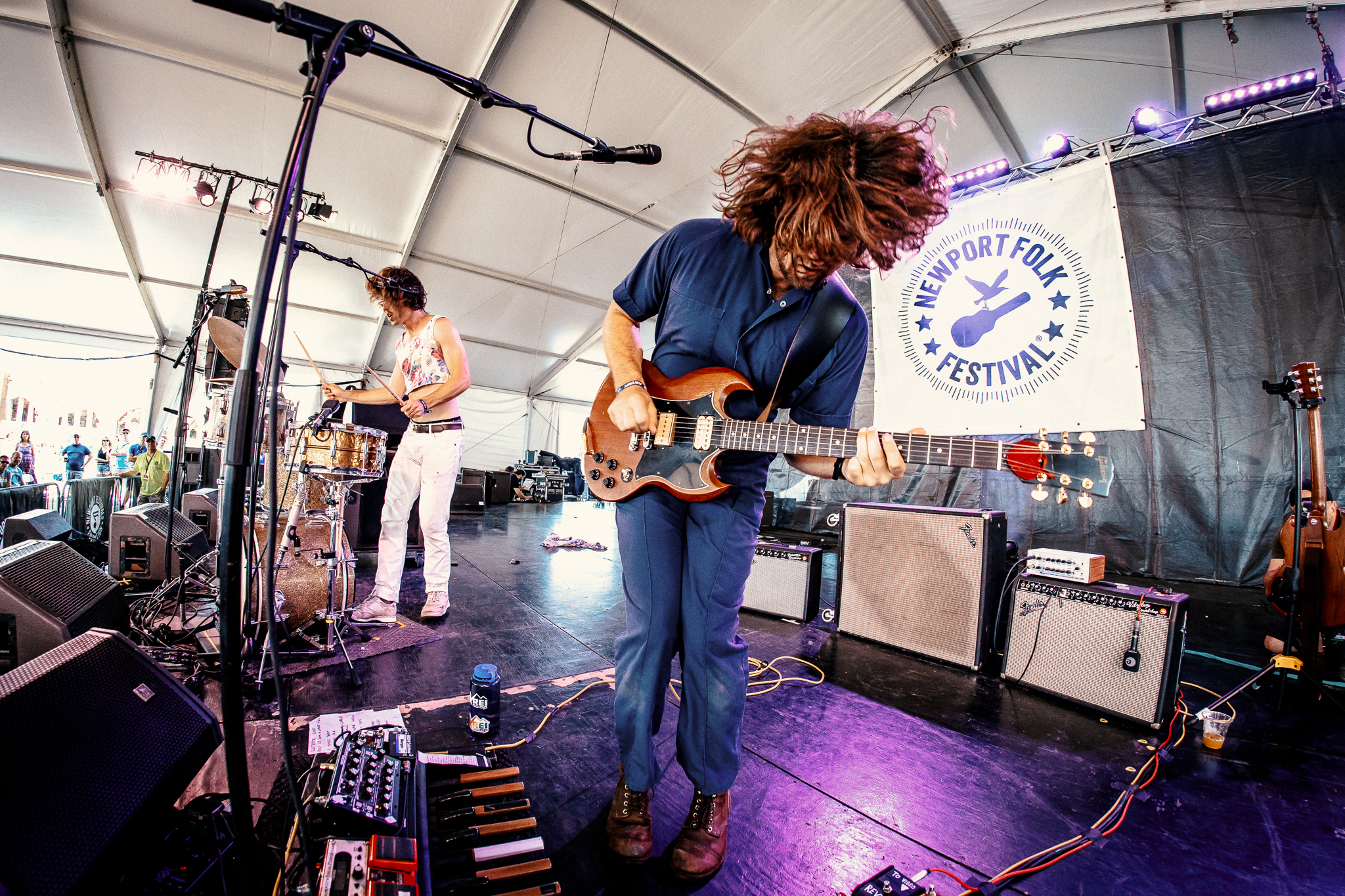
Illiterate Light performs at Newport Folk Festival in Newport, RI

They spent 2015-2018 touring, and ultimately signed a record deal with Atlantic Records in 2019. They have performed at such festivals as Bonnaroo, Lollapalooza, Shaky Knees, Newport Folk Festival, and more. Additionally they toured with acts such as Rainbow Kitten Surprise, Rayland Baxter, Shakey Graves, Mt. Joy, and The Head and the Heart.

Their debut album was recorded in Richmond, VA at Montrose Recording and Nashville, TN at Sputnik Sound with producer Vance Powell. It was mixed by Vance Powell and released on October 11, 2019, with their single Better Than I Used To remaining on the AAA radio charts for several months. NPR cited Illiterate Light as one of the 2020 Artists To Watch Out For, and additionally called Better Than I Used To one of the best songs of 2019. The Covid-19 Pandemic cut all touring and marketing efforts short at which point Illiterate Light left Atlantic Records to pursue an independent path.

Their second LP Sunburned was recorded again at Montrose Recording in Richmond, VA with co-producer Adrian Olsen and engineer Danny Gibney. Sunburned marked a turn in their songwriting towards a heavier and darker introspection, with fuzzed out guitars and copious reverb. SPIN Magazine cited Sunburned as "one of the best albums of 2023." Sunburned was released on Illiterate Light's own record label Red Book Records with marketing and distribution by Thirty Tigers. They followed the release of Sunburned with a 4-song EP titled Aloe, containing several songs that were written during the Sunburned sessions. Always, Always features Cochran on lead vocals.

They released their third studio album Arches on November 1, 2024. The album was co-produced by Gorman and Cochran alongside long-time collaborator Danny Gibney at Gorman's personal studio in Virginia. Additionally they worked with producer Joe Chiccarelli at Sunset Sound in Los Angeles, CA on featured tracks Blood Lines and All the Stars are Burning Out. Consequence nominated Arches as one of the best albums of November 2024, citing "traces of Radiohead, Tame Impala, and There Is Nothing Left to Lose-era Foo Fighters."

Illiterate Light was named among the top rock bands to come out of the South by Garden and Gun Magazine.

== Discography ==
=== Studio albums ===
- Illiterate Light (2019)
- Sunburned (2023)
- Arches (2024)

=== Extended Plays ===
- Langue (2015)
- Earthworm (2016)
- Ego Flora (2017)
- Sweet Beast (2018)
- Aloe (2023)
- Slow Down Time (2024)
