= Charlie Hickey (musician) =

American musician (born 1999)

- Born: Charlie Dworsky-Hickey; September 28, 1999 (age 26); Pasadena, California, US
- Genres: Indie rock; alternative rock; indie folk
- Occupations: Singer-songwriter; musician
- Instruments: Vocals; guitar
- Years active: 2013–present
- Labels: Saddest Factory
- Website: charliehickey.com

Charlie Hickey (born September 28, 1999) is an American indie rock musician from Pasadena, California. Hickey is currently signed to Phoebe Bridgers' Saddest Factory Records.

== Biography ==
=== Early life and musical beginnings ===
Charlie Dworsky-Hickey was born in Pasadena, California, on September 28, 1999. He is the son of American singer-songwriter and playback singer Sally Dworsky and songwriter Chris Hickey. He has a twin sister. He began collaborating with musician Phoebe Bridgers after posting a cover of her song "Radar" on YouTube in 2013, when he was thirteen. Hickey released his first EP age fourteen and began to take music more seriously after moving to college, which he attended for only one year. He lists Nirvana, Incubus, Conor Oberst, and Elliott Smith as his early influences. His first EP, titled Odds, released through SoundCloud in April 2014, featured Bridgers as a collaborator.

=== 2020–2021: Count the Stairs ===
In October 2020, Hickey released the single "No Good at Lying", again featuring Bridgers.

He published songs and covers independently through SoundCloud and YouTube until the release of his second EP, Count the Stairs, in June 2021, through Saddest Factory Records. The song "Ten Feet Tall" yet again features Bridgers.

In August 2021, Hickey collaborated with MUNA on a reimagined version of his song "Seeing Things".

=== 2022–2023: Nervous at Night ===
In March 2022, Hickey announced his debut album, Nervous at Night, which came out on May 20. Phoebe Bridgers, Christian Lee Hutson, Harrison Whitford, and Marshall Vore all collaborated on the project. Along with the album announcement, Hickey issued the title track, "Nervous at Night". Two more singles, "Dandelion" and "Gold Line", were subsequently released.

In December 2022, Hickey featured on a version of ella jane's "Sore Loser". In March 2023, he released a cover of MGMT's "Time to Pretend".

== Discography ==
Studio albums

- Nervous at Night (2022)
- Could've Been Anyone (2025)

EPs

- Odds (2014)
- Count the Stairs (2021)

Singles

- "Nervous at Night" (2022)
- "Time to Pretend" (2023)
