= Primetime (soundtrack) =

2026 film soundtrack album

Primetime (Original Soundtrack)

Film score by Ari Balouzian
- Released: September 25, 2026
- Recorded: 2024–2026
- Studios: Appraiser, Los Angeles
- Genre: Film score
- Length: 62:54
- Label: A24 Music
- Producer: Ari Balouzian

Ari Balouzian chronology
| Monsters of God (2026) | Primetime (2026) | You Can See Everything (2026) |

Singles from Primetime
- 1. "Savior" Released: September 11, 2026; 2. "On Video" Released: September 25, 2026

Primetime (Original Soundtrack) is the film score composed by Ari Balouzian to the 2026 film Primetime directed by Lance Oppenheim. It features 24 pieces composed by Balouzian and an original song, "On Video", featured in the end credits. The instrumental single "Savior" was released on September 11, 2026, while "On Video" was released on September 25, along with the album distributed by A24 Music.

== Development ==
Ari Balouzian composed the film score, who previously worked with Oppenheim on his documentary feature film Some Kind of Heaven (2020) and the television series Ren Faire (2024). His involvement was officially announced in May 2024. Speaking to The Line of Best Fit in September 2026, Balouzian stated that he "started working on Primetime after reading the script, and had access to the dailies while they were shooting, so the process started super early". Balouzian further added that he and Oppenheim were able to craft the sound during the production itself so that they could use those pieces during editing and also helped the music being the emotional identity of the film, that the actors and other artisans could interact with. Pattinson listened to the soundtrack while filming to help get into character. The score was eventually produced, performed and recorded by Balouzian himself at his music production studio Appraiser, which he had co-founded.

Singer-songwriter Phoebe Bridgers, who made her acting debut had also contributed to the end credits single "On Video". As described by NME, Bridgers's "On Video" works to "draw on elements of the original score for the film" featuring "a softer opening [building] into heavier, distorted guitar textures before settling back down." She performed the single as part of The Lost Tour, which coincided with the release of Primetime.

== Release ==
Primetime (Original Soundtrack) was released by A24 Music in digital and physical formats day-and-date with the film on September 25, 2026. The album was preceded by the instrumental track "Savior" and "On Video"—both featured in the end credits—being released as single on September 11 and 25, respectively.

== Reception ==
Ben of Soundtrack Universe reviewed "For most prospective listeners a curated playlist will need to be made to best enjoy Primetime, though as an introduction to the stylings of Balouzian, this reviewer is interested to hear what else he can craft in the future." Jessica Kiang of Variety described it as a "throbbing, queasy score". Nikki Baughan of Screen International called it a "classically infected yet edgy score". Elisabetta Bianchini of Yahoo Canada said that "Ari Balouzian's haunting score elevates every psychological thriller element [of the film] always making the viewer feel uneasy watching each moment." Gene Park of The Washington Post wrote "The score by Ari Balouzian, with its chimes, winds and lilting string arrangements bathe the film in the sound of classic Hollywood aspiration."

Taylor Gates of Collider wrote that Balouzian's score combines "smooth, nostalgic jazz and heart-pounding, borderline dissonant percussion" thereby acting as a "tone poem and guiding force leading [the audience] through the film's sharp twists and turns". Lisa Laman of The Spool called it as an "intentionally and compelling dissonant score" which was reminiscent of the music from Douglas Sirk's features. Samuel Goodman of SLUG wrote "Over an hour of soundtrack was put together by Ari Balouzian and Phoebe Bridgers, with droning guitars and ambiance, giving a feeling of dread and primal righteousness in the perfect places." Zachary Barnes of The Wall Street Journal called it "overbearing".

== Track listing ==
Every track is composed by Ari Balouzian, except "On Video", which is composed by Phoebe Bridgers.

| No. | Title | Length |
|---|---|---|
| 1. | "Incantations" | 1:17 |
| 2. | "Encounter" | 1:23 |
| 3. | "Undressing" | 2:16 |
| 4. | "The Craft" | 2:23 |
| 5. | "National Epidemic" | 3:00 |
| 6. | "Primetime" | 3:02 |
| 7. | "The Perfect Family" | 2:32 |
| 8. | "First Day on the Job" | 2:56 |
| 9. | "Boy Scout" | 2:30 |
| 10. | "Ambition" | 2:28 |
| 11. | "Merrygoround" | 1:58 |
| 12. | "Fan Mail" | 1:52 |
| 13. | "Trawling" | 2:31 |
| 14. | "Showtime" | 1:35 |
| 15. | "BBQ" | 3:08 |
| 16. | "India 1996" | 3:58 |
| 17. | "The Search" | 2:13 |
| 18. | "Ghost Car" | 2:44 |
| 19. | "Pillory" | 2:53 |
| 20. | "The Righteous" | 2:37 |
| 21. | "Head on a Stick" | 1:46 |
| 22. | "Ace in the Hole" | 3:27 |
| 23. | "SAG Card" | 1:59 |
| 24. | "Savior" | 2:54 |
| 25. | "On Video" | 3:32 |
| Total length: | | 62:54 |

== Charts ==
| Chart (2026) | Peak position |
|---|---|
| UK Album Downloads (OCC) | 71 |
| UK Soundtrack Albums (OCC) | 47 |
| US Top Soundtracks (Billboard) | 24 |
