= Dan Reeder (musician) =

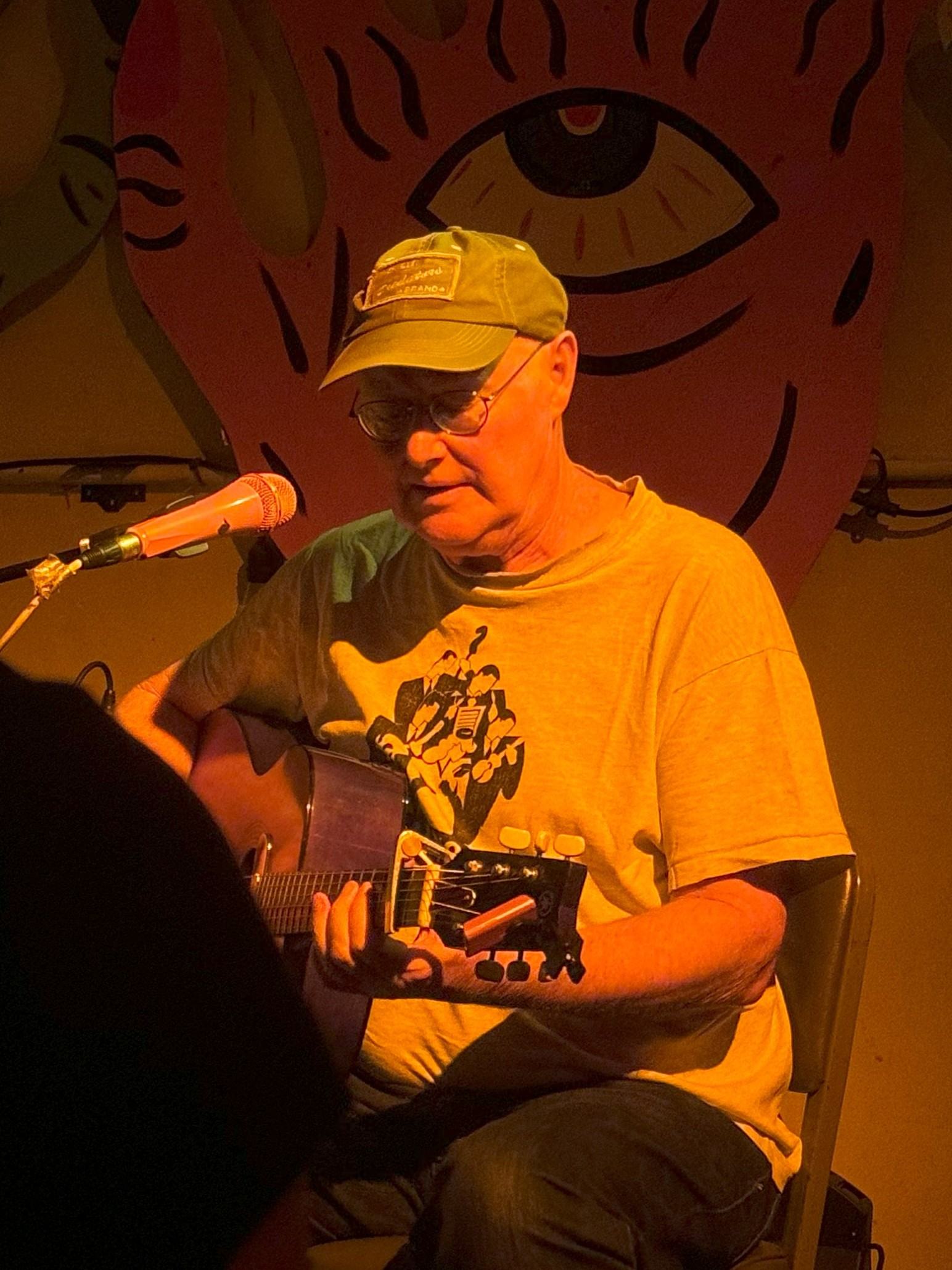
- Reeder in 2024

Background information
- Born: 1954 (age 71–72); Louisiana, U.S.
- Genre: Folk
- Label: Oh Boy Records

Dan Reeder is an American musician and artist. He was born in Louisiana in 1954 and raised in California.

== Career ==
Reeder started his artistic career at Chapman University in Orange County, California. In 1980, Dan transferred to California State University, Fullerton to study fine arts. He relocated to Nuremberg, Germany with one semester left.

Reeder was signed to John Prine's Oh Boy Records recording label after sending Prine a self-made CD of his songs. His self-titled debut album was released in 2003. Previously with Prine, he performed regularly in North America and Europe.

Reeder writes, arranges, and engineers his recordings on which the instruments and vocals are played and performed by himself through the use of multi-layering. He taught himself how to build his own computers, amplifiers, microphones and P.A. systems, some from scratch. Reeder is also an instrument maker and builds most of the instruments that he uses for recordings and live shows.

In 2006, Reeder opened the Nuremberg Bardentreffen (an open-air music festival in Nuremberg, Germany) with a concert on the Klarissenplatz. In 2010, he was awarded the Promotion Prize of the city of Nuremberg.

Besides being more widely recognized as a musician and recording artist, Reeder is primarily a painter and visual artist. All of his albums feature his own original work as cover art. In 2012 he published an overview of his work entitled Art Pussies Fear This Book.

His five song EP Nobody Wants To Be You was released in 2018.

In 2020, Reeder released his 20-song album Every Which Way on Oh Boy Records. The "deluxe edition of...Every Which Way is an expansion of the original’s musings on current events and societal surrealness. Covering ground from scientific advancement to the 2016 election, the male gaze, and the nature of aging itself, the 28-song release clocks in at just under an hour of listening time..."

Later that year, Dan Reeder was featured on the R&B artist Dijon's "The Stranger", which Rolling Stone's Jon Blistein described as a "Folk song modeled after hip-hop posse cuts also boasts Sachi DiSerafino, Dan Reeder, Thea Gustafsson".

In 2022, Dan Reeder was featured artist on musician / comedian Whitmer Thomas' song "South Florida", "a heartfelt song about Thomas' guilt about his estrangement from his father, slouching down so his father won't notice how much his son has grown because he didn't want his dad to feel like he'd 'missed out.' The sentimental lyrics are heightened with Thomas' father giving his own perspective, too, through Dan Reeder singing as Thomas Sr."

Since 2024, Dan has toured and performed with his daughter Peggy Reeder. In March 2026, Dan and Peggy Reeder released their live album, Dan and Peggy Reeder Live. That same month, Dan and Peggy performed Maybe and a cover of John Prine's Speed of the Sound of Loneliness on The Late Show With Stephen Colbert.

On July 15 2026, Reeder accompanied Phoebe Bridgers in a surprise appearance on The Tonight Show Starring Jimmy Fallon, performing an acoustic rendition of Bridgers' single "Lost Boys".

== Reception ==
Reeder has been called "one of the foremost outsider artists in modern folk" by The New Yorker's Ben Greenman. He has been said to sound like a wispy John Prine and a bluesy Kenny Rogers.

Reeder is noted for his original compositions (with titles such as "Food and Pussy", "Bach is Dead and Gone," and "Work Song," which was featured on the Emmy-winning show Weeds). His songs are often described as odd, original and humorous. His music has received critical acclaim for its unique blending of blues, folk, gospel and field hollers.

== Personal ==
Reeder met his German-born wife Susanne while attending California State University, Fullerton. He relocated to Nuremberg, Germany with Susanne when she experienced visa difficulties. He has been a resident there ever since.

== Exhibitions ==
Reeder's paintings are represented in collections internationally, including the Bayerisches Armeemuseum in Munich, Neues Museum Nürnberg and the Fränkischen Galerie Nürnberg. Additionally, Reeder has exhibited at 9. Triennale Kleinplastik, Fellbach (2004); Kunsthaus, Nürnberg (2008); Galerie Bernsteinzimmer, Nürnberg (2008/2020); Kunstgalerie Fürth (2009); E.T.A.-Hoffmann-Theater, Bamberg (2016); and in a group exhibition titled “Nürnberg Schule” in the Kunstvilla (2019 – 2020).

== Discography ==
Year	Title	Label	Number	Notes
2004	Dan Reeder	Oh Boy	OBR-027	
2006	Sweetheart	Oh Boy	OBR-036	
2010	This New Century	Oh Boy	OBR-041	
2017	Nobody Wants to Be You	Oh Boy	OBR-045	
2020	Every Which Way	Oh Boy	OBR-053	
2024	Smithereens	Oh Boy	OBR-085	
