= You Can See Everything (soundtrack) =

2026 film soundtrack album

You Can See Everything (Original Soundtrack)

Film score by Ari Balouzian
- Released: October 16, 2026
- Recorded: 2026
- Studios: Appraiser, Los Angeles
- Genre: Film score
- Length: 67:26
- Label: A24 Music
- Producer: Ari Balouzian

Ari Balouzian chronology
Primetime (2026)	You Can See Everything (2026)

You Can See Everything (Original Soundtrack) is the film score composed by Ari Balouzian to the 2026 documentary film You Can See Everything directed by Lance Oppenheim. The soundtrack accompanied 25 tracks which was released through A24 Music on October 16, 2026.

== Background and release ==
Ari Balouzian, a frequent collaborator of Oppenheim scored the music for the documentary You Can See Everything. Balouzian was inspired by Bernard Herrmann's Vertigo (1958) and Trent Reznor and Atticus Ross' The Social Network (2010) to curate a psychologically tense soundscape of rhythmic piano and ascending chords. The soundtrack was released through A24 Music on October 16, 2026.

== Reception ==
Filmtracks wrote "The recording unfortunately exhibits many of the worst stereotypes of low-budget documentary scores, and on album, it cannot make for even interesting music even if a cue like "Inventing" is easy to digest and moderately enjoyable. Understatement only works when it doesn't bore you to death." Tim Grierson of Screen International wrote "Ari Balouzian's ominous score [...] create layers of suspense". Amy Nicholson of Los Angeles Times wrote "Composer Ari Balouzian seems to borrow bits of Bernard Herrmann's violin score from Vertigo".

Peter Gray of The AU Review wrote "Ari Balouzian's ominous score, with its mechanical textures and quietly escalating tension, lends the proceedings an almost horror-like atmosphere". Critics based at CNET wrote "Closed-in, melodic, off-kilter, eerie, heartbreaking… these are just some ways to describe the documentary, largely thanks to the atmospheric elements composer Ari Balouzian brought to the project. Sometimes, a movie is best when it changes you on an emotional level." Nick Schager of The Daily Beast said that Balouzian's score "segue[s] freely from intriguing to mischievous to menacing". Cary Darling of Houston Chronicle wrote "The minimalist yet threatening and tense score from Ari Balouzian underscores the menacing mood".

== Track listing ==
No.	Title	Length
1.	"Watcher"	3:46
2.	"The Council Has Spoken"	0:43
3.	"Telepathy"	1:38
4.	"Why a Bandaid"	5:32
5.	"You Can See Everything"	1:09
6.	"Inventing"	2:44
7.	"Famous Photo"	1:28
8.	"Starlight"	1:41
9.	"You Got This"	4:43
10.	"A New Time"	3:27
11.	"Lasers"	2:31
12.	"Reptiles"	2:46
13.	"Must Be Weird"	2:33
14.	"Total Recall"	3:38
15.	"Pizza Party"	2:18
16.	"Pamela"	2:58
17.	"Unresolved"	2:58
18.	"Only You"	3:52
19.	"The Call"	2:43
20.	"Upstate"	1:03
21.	"Clench"	2:57
22.	"Her Show"	2:00
23.	"Monuments of Love"	3:46
24.	"Kinda Nice"	1:29
25.	"V8"	3:03
Total length:		67:26

== Accolades ==
Award	Date	Category	Recipient(s)	Result	Ref.
Cinema Eye Honors	January 11, 2027	Outstanding Achievement in Original Music Score	Ari Balouzian	Pending	
Critics' Choice Documentary Awards	November 8, 2026	Best Music Score	Ari Balouzian	Won	
Hollywood Music in Media Awards	November 18, 2026	Best Original Score – Documentary	Ari Balouzian	Pending	
