= Lost Weekend (Phoebe Bridgers album) =

Studio album by Phoebe Bridgers
- Released: August 14, 2026
- Recorded: 2024–2026
- Studios: Sound City (Van Nuys, California): Electric Lady (New York City); Tamarind (Los Angeles, California)
- Genres: Indie folk; Americana; folktronica; emo-folk; ambient
- Length: 52:26
- Label: Dead Oceans
- Producers: Phoebe Bridgers; Ethan Gruska; Jack Antonoff; Tony Berg; Alexander Giannascoli

Phoebe Bridgers chronology
The Rest (2023)	Lost Weekend (2026)

Singles from Lost Weekend
- 1. "Lost Boys" Released: June 25, 2026

Lost Weekend is the third studio album by American singer-songwriter Phoebe Bridgers. It was released on August 14, 2026, through Dead Oceans. Marking her first solo release in six years, the album continues Bridgers's signature indie folk style while exploring electronica and ambient genres. Lyrically, Lost Weekend discusses grief, love, disillusionment from fame, and is thematically centered around the death of Bridgers's father in 2022 and her relationship with American comedian, actor and musician Bo Burnham.

In producing the album, Bridgers enlisted long-time collaborators Tony Berg and Ethan Gruska. Other prominent contributors include Jack Antonoff, Alex G, Bo Burnham, Cameron Winter, Maya Hawke, and Bridgers's collaborators from Boygenius, Lucy Dacus and Julien Baker. To promote the album, Bridgers embarked on The Lost Tour in September 2026. The tour will conclude in May 2027. The album received critical acclaim.

== Background ==
Prior to Lost Weekend, Bridgers's last solo studio album was Punisher, released six years prior in 2020. In October 2020, Bridgers formed Saddest Factory Records as an imprint of Dead Oceans.

In 2023, the supergroup Boygenius, consisting of Bridgers, Julien Baker and Lucy Dacus, reunited. That year, they released their debut album The Record and follow-up EP The Rest. After the 2024 Grammys, Bridgers revealed that she planned to take a break for the remainder of the year. This hiatus continued throughout 2025, where she kept a low public profile and didn't post on social media, save for occasional Instagram stories.

== Composition ==
Lost Weekend sees Bridgers explore past high-profile relationships, the formation of a stable new relationship, grief and dissociation with her fame. During the writing and recording of Lost Weekend, Bridgers was influenced by ambient music with her saying that its "method of emotional transfer from composer to listener is totally different than it is when relying on a lyric to tell you something". On opening track "The Outside", Bridgers sings through a vocoder to signal a state of upheaval while "crying in a suit and tie" at her father's funeral. On the title track, Bridgers alludes to her engagement and breakup with Paul Mescal in 2022 with her singing "I'm supposed to be married, but I called it off". "The Governor's Waltz" was written in 3/4 time signature typical of waltz music with Bridgers discussing her 2021 performance at the Governors Ball Music Festival in New York City where she was "hiding in the bathroom like Shelley Duvall", a reference to Duvall's character Wendy Torrance in the climactic scene of The Shining.

Bridgers deals with the difficult relationship with her father, Tony Bridgers, and his death in December 2022 on "Still Standing". Bridgers had described her father as engaging in "textbook domestic violence" against her mother with "Still Standing" portraying such a scene with her mother "bleeding over the sink". A voicemail from Tony Bridgers is featured on "Never Going Back!" backed by a banjo instrumental. Closing track "Lost Weekend (Reprise)" sees Bridgers admit that she is more like her imperfect father than she was previously willing to acknowledge. Lost Weekend is dedicated to her father.

== Promotion and release ==
Bridgers eschewed traditional sit-down interviews to promote Lost Weekend and instead debuted new songs through a series of pop-up shows. In May and June 2026, Bridgers played a series of phone-free pop-up concerts across the United States, culminating in a surprise concert at Madison Square Garden in New York City. On June 5, she announced The Lost Tour, a phone-free arena tour running from September to December 2026, with Alex G and Isaac Wood as opening acts.

On June 24, Bridgers announced Lost Weekend, with a release date of August 14 through Dead Oceans. The first single from the album, "Lost Boys", was released the following day, alongside a music video directed by Lance Oppenheim and Pablo Rochat. Bridgers performed "Lost Boys" on The Tonight Show Starring Jimmy Fallon on July 15 with children in her backing band. The album's track list was revealed on July 28. From August 10 to August 14, the album was debuted at thirty-four planetaria across Europe, North America, and Oceania. The ticketed events, sponsored by Spotify, took one of two forms: a dome show designed by Babak Tafreshi or a laser show by Laser Fantasy. Additionally, more than three hundred locations offered official album listening parties on the night of August 13. The August 14 album release was accompanied by the music video for "I Can't Wait," directed by Chris Maggio and Pablo Rochat.

== Critical reception ==
Professional ratings
Aggregate scores
Source	Rating
AnyDecentMusic?	8.9/10
Metacritic	91/100
Review scores
Source	Rating
AllMusic	4/5 stars
Consequence	A−
The Daily Telegraph	5/5 stars
The Guardian	5/5 stars
Mojo	4/5 stars
Paste	A–
Pitchfork	8.4/10
Rolling Stone	4.5/5 stars
Slant Magazine	4.5/5 stars
Uncut	4/5 stars

Lost Weekend was met with universal critical acclaim. According to Metacritic, the album received "universal acclaim" based on a weighted average score of 91 out of 100 from 22 critic scores. The review aggregator AnyDecentMusic? gave the album a weighted average score of 8.9 out of 10 from twenty-six critic scores.

Alexis Petridis of The Guardian expressed that the album's result was "a heady, potent, occasionally wrenching album, albeit one flecked with optimism". Wren Graves of Consequence praised Bridger's lyrics and the album's progression, while Victoria Segal of Mojo noted that the death of Bridgers's father defined the album, which was also noted by Abby Jones of Paste. Jones also praised the joint production of Berg, Gruska, Antonoff and Giannascoli, saying that the latter's presence "makes for some of the most exciting, unexpected production choices in Bridgers' catalog yet". Pitchfork's Sam Sodomsky praised the album as the "most cohesive" in her discography, and Angie Martoccio from Rolling Stone called it her "most daring album" and a "tour de force in the art of feeling grief".

== Accolades and nominations ==
On November 16, 2026, Lost Weekend was nominated for seven Grammy Awards, due to be presented at the 69th annual ceremony on February 7, 2027.

Its major nominations include Album of the Year and Best Alternative Music Album. The lead single "Lost Boys" is nominated for Best Rock Song, Best Rock Performance and Best Music Video, "Kill Me" is nominated for Best Alternative Music Performance, and "The Governor's Waltz" is nominated for Best Arrangement, Instrumental and Vocals.

== Track listing ==
Lost Weekend track listing
No.	Title	Writer(s)	Producer(s)	Length
1.	"The Outside"	Phoebe Bridgers; Christian Lee Hutson; Marshall Vore	Bridgers; Ethan Gruska; Tony Berg; Jack Antonoff	3:57
2.	"Lost Boys"	Bridgers; Alexander Giannascoli; Hutson; Vore; Robert Burnham	Bridgers; Gruska; Berg; Antonoff; Giannascoli^{[a]}	4:14
3.	"Kill Me"	Bridgers; Hutson; Gruska	Bridgers; Gruska; Berg; Antonoff; Giannascoli^{[a]}	4:41
4.	"The Governor's Waltz"	Bridgers; Hutson; Burnham; Vore	Bridgers; Gruska; Berg; Antonoff	3:27
5.	"Bobby"	Bridgers; Hutson; Burnham; Vore; Gruska; Antonoff	Bridgers; Gruska; Berg; Antonoff; Giannascoli^{[a]}	3:59
6.	"Lost Weekend"	Bridgers; Hutson; Damien Jurado	Bridgers; Gruska; Berg; Antonoff; Giannascoli^{[a]}	3:38
7.	"Haunted"	Bridgers; Hutson; Maya Hawke; Giannascoli; Burnham; Lucy Dacus; Julien Baker; Vore; Antonoff	Bridgers; Gruska; Berg; Antonoff; Giannascoli^{[a]}	3:34
8.	"Panorama"	Bridgers	Bridgers; Gruska; Berg; Antonoff; Giannascoli^{[a]}	2:46
9.	"Still Standing"	Bridgers	Bridgers; Gruska; Berg; Antonoff; Giannascoli^{[a]}	3:56
10.	"Liberty Tree"	Bridgers; Hutson; Vore	Bridgers; Gruska; Berg; Antonoff; Giannascoli^{[a]}	3:17
11.	"Never Going Back!"	Bridgers; Hutson; Hawke	Bridgers; Gruska; Berg; Antonoff; Giannascoli^{[a]}	1:42
12.	"Other Plans"	Bridgers; Hutson; Vore	Bridgers; Gruska; Berg; Antonoff; Giannascoli^{[a]}	2:20
13.	"Lost Parade"	Bridgers	Bridgers; Gruska; Berg; Antonoff; Giannascoli^{[a]}	0:55
14.	"I Can't Wait"	Bridgers; Hutson; Burnham	Bridgers; Gruska; Berg; Antonoff	3:37
15.	"As Above"	Bridgers; Hutson; Burnham; Vore	Bridgers; Gruska; Berg; Antonoff	4:24
16.	"Lost Weekend (Reprise)"	Bridgers; Jurado; Burnham	Bridgers; Gruska; Berg; Antonoff	1:59
Total length:				52:26

Vinyl/CD bonus track (Note: On the CD, "Best Dressed" is hidden in the pregap. On the LP, it is found unlabeled on side D.)
No.	Title	Writer(s)	Producer(s)	Length
17.	"Best Dressed"	Bridgers; Hutson; Burnham	Bridgers; Gruska; Berg; Antonoff	3:52
Total length:				56:18

- "Lost Weekend" and "Lost Weekend (Reprise)" contain elements of "The Last Great Washington State" by Damien Jurado
- "Lost Weekend" contains a samples of "Notjustmoreidlechatter" by Paul Lansky and
- "Panorama" interpolates "Twice" by Jake Minch
- ^{^[a]} Additional producer

== Personnel ==
All personnel credits are adapted from the album's liner notes.

Core personnel

- Phoebe Bridgers – vocals, vocal arrangement (all); acoustic guitar (tracks 1–3, 5, 9, 11, 13, 14); bass synth (5); synthesizer (6, 10, 14, 16); organ (6, 16); piano (12); bass guitar, vocoder (14)
- Tony Berg – acoustic guitar (track 1); electric guitar (2, 3, 14); bass guitar, electric sitar (2); banjo (13)
- Ethan Gruska – piano (tracks 1–4, 8–10, 15, "Best Dressed"); synthesizer (1–10, 12–15, "Best Dressed"); sound design (1–9, 11, 12); vocoder (1, 7, 9); programming (2); drum programming (2, 7); electric guitar (3, 5); organ (3, 11, 15); bass guitar (3, 7, 13); vocals (5); pump organ (7); banjo (11); percussion (13); whistle (15)
- Jack Antonoff – synthesizer (tracks 1–3, 5–10, 14, "Best Dressed"); programming (2, 14, "Best Dressed"); drums (2, 3, 5, 7, 11, 14); electric guitar (2–9, 11, 14, "Best Dressed"); vocoder (2, 3, 6–9, 14); drum programming (2–10, 14, 15); sound design (3, 6–9, 12); acoustic guitar (3, 5, 7); baritone guitar (3); bass guitar (5, 7, 14, "Best Dressed"); banjo (5, 6, 9); harmonica (7, 9); percussion (9, 13, "Best Dressed"); strings, whistle (10); piano (14); CP80, harpsichord, vocals ("Best Dressed"); engineering
- Alex Giannascoli – drums, voice memo (track 2); piano (3), synthesizers (4, 6, 7, 10, 14); drum programming (6, 10), acoustic guitar, vocoder (8); additional production (unspecified tracks
- Caroline Shaw – vocal arrangements (all); vocals (tracks 2–10, 14, 16, "Best Dressed"); viola (5, 6, 9)

Additional musicians

- Jon Brion – synthesizer (1, "Best Dressed"); electric guitar (13)
- Bo Burnham – vocals (tracks 1, 5, 11)
- Greg Leisz – pedal steel guitar (tracks 1, 3, 7, 9, 11, 14)
- Blake Mills – synth guitar (track 1); synthesizer (2); upright bass (3); acoustic guitar (10, 15); bass guitar, tenor guitar (10)
- Rob Moose – strings (tracks 1–4, 6, 8, 9, 14–16), string arranger (1–4, 6, 8, 9, 14–16); engineering (tracks 1, 3–16)
- Julien Baker – vocals (tracks 2, 7), synthesizer (7)
- Lucy Dacus – vocals (tracks 2, 7)
- Christian Lee Hutson – acoustic guitar (tracks 2–4, 9); piano (4); mandocello (4, 15); baritone guitar (5); banjo (8); electric guitar (14, "Best Dressed"); 12-string acoustic guitar (15)
- Will Maclellan – drum programming (2, 7, 10); recording, engineering (all)
- Sebastian Steinberg – upright bass (track 2)
- Chris Thile – mandolin (tracks 2, 3, 6–9, 11, 14); violin (7, 14); acoustic guitar (7, 14)
- Marshall Vore – drums (tracks 2, 3, 8, 13, 14, "Best Dressed"); percussion (2)
- Nate Walcott – trumpet (tracks 2, 13)
- Harrison Whitford – electric guitar (tracks 2, 14); 12-string guitar (2, 10); baritone guitar (4)
- Benny Bock – synthesizer (tracks 3, 7—10, 15); piano (10, 15); organ (10)
- Jackson Bridgers – vocals (track 3)
- Bobby Hawk – strings (tracks 3, 5, 7, 10)
- Son-John Johnson (Note: Cameron Winter is credited under the name Son-John Johnson.) – vocals (tracks 3, 14)
- Gabe Noel – sarangi (track 3); cello, upright bass (14)
- Maria Taylor – vocals (tracks 3, 9, 15)
- Jeroen Vrijhoef – vocals (tracks 3, 15, "Best Dressed")
- Nick Zinner – electric guitar (track 3)
- Jim Keltner – drums (track 4)
- Justin Broadrick/Jesu – electric guitar (5, "Best Dressed")
- Mike Kinsella – electric guitar (track 5)
- Kane Ritchotte – drums (tracks 5, 7)
- Nickel Creek (Chris Thile, Sara Watkins, Sean Watkins) – acoustic guitar, mandolin, violin (tracks 7, 14)
- CJ Camerieri – horn (tracks 8, 15); french horn (11); brass (14)
- Tim Carr – drums (track 10)
- Meg Duffy – electric guitar (track 10)
- Conor Oberst – harmonica (track 14); vocals ("Best Dressed")
- Maxine – vocals (track 16)
- Isaac Wood – vocals ("Best Dressed")

Technical personnel

- Laura Sisk – recording, engineering
- Jozef Caldwell – engineering
- Sam Gazarian – engineering
- Cam Gilfoy – engineering
- Oli Jacobs – engineering; mixing (track "Best Dressed")
- Jack Manning – engineering
- Kellie McGrew – engineering
- Joey Miller – engineering
- Dani Perez – engineering
- Gregg White – engineering
- Mike Mogis – mixing
- Ruairí O'Flaherty – mastering

Creative personnel

- Olaf Grind – photography
- John Griswold – booklet illustrations
- Melissa Cobstandse – booklet layout & design
- Open Sea Design Co. – booklet layout & design
- Nick Scott – sleeve layout & design

== Charts ==
Chart performance for Lost Weekend
Chart (2026)	Peak position
Australian Albums (ARIA)	1
Austrian Albums (Ö3 Austria)	6
Belgian Albums (Ultratop Flanders)	3
Belgian Albums (Ultratop Wallonia)	7
Canadian Albums (Billboard)	3
Croatian International Albums (HDU)	6
Danish Albums (Hitlisten)	6
Dutch Albums (Album Top 100)	2
Finnish Albums (Suomen virallinen lista)	5
French Albums (SNEP)	30
French Rock & Metal Albums (SNEP)	4
German Albums (Offizielle Top 100)	2
German Rock & Metal Albums (Offizielle Top 100)	1
Irish Albums (Official Charts)	2
Irish Independent Albums (IRMA)	1
Italian Albums (FIMI)	81
Japanese Download Albums (Billboard Japan)	56
Japanese Rock Albums (Oricon)	8
Japanese Top Albums Sales (Billboard Japan)	59
Japanese Western Albums (Oricon)	23
New Zealand Albums (RMNZ)	1
Norwegian Albums (IFPI Norge)	9
Polish Albums (ZPAV)	83
Portuguese Albums (AFP)	8
Scottish Albums (Official Charts)	1
Spanish Albums (Promusicae)	12
Swedish Albums (Sverigetopplistan)	3
Swiss Albums (Schweizer Hitparade)	7
UK Albums (Official Charts)	1
UK Americana Albums (Official Charts)	1
UK Independent Albums (Official Charts)	1
US Billboard 200	2
US Americana/Folk Albums (Billboard)	1
US Independent Albums (Billboard)	1
US Top Rock & Alternative Albums (Billboard)	1

== Certifications ==
Certifications for Lost Weekend
Region	Certification	Certified units/sales
United Kingdom (BPI)	Silver	60,000^{‡}
^{‡} Sales+streaming figures based on certification alone.
