= Farewell Tour (Phoebe Bridgers) =

2018–2019 concert tour

- Tour by Phoebe Bridgers
- Location: North America, United Kingdom, Australia
- Associated album: Stranger in the Alps
- Start date: February 3, 2018
- End date: February 17, 2019
- Legs: 3
- No. of shows: 41

Phoebe Bridgers concert chronology
- Farewell Tour; Julien Baker and Phoebe Bridgers with Lucy Dacus Tour

Farewell Tour was the debut concert tour from American indie folk musician Phoebe Bridgers. The tour began in Santa Ana, California on February 3, 2018 and ended in Melbourne, Australia on February 17, 2019.

== Background ==
Phoebe Bridgers released her debut EP Killer in 2014. Two years later, Bridgers opened for Julien Baker on her Sprained Ankle tour. Two years later, Bridgers opened for Conor Oberst on his 2017 tour. In late 2016, Bridgers announced her debut full-length album, Stranger in the Alps. Bridgers announced her first headlining tour for the album in December 2017. Bridgers announced dates in the United Kingdom in early 2018. In December 2018, Bridgers announced the Australian leg of her Farewell Tour.

== Reception ==
The tour received positive reviews. In a review from The Independent, the publication notes "The captivating performance served up a spectrum of emotions varying from utter devastation to goosebump induced awe from one song to the next but carried through with the sort of charm and modesty that makes her so damn likeable".

== Tour dates ==
List of concerts, showing date, city, country, venue, and opening act
Date	City	Country	Venue	Opening act(s)
Leg 1 – North America
February 3, 2018	Santa Ana	United States	Constellation Room	Soccer Mommy
February 5, 2018	San Diego	United States	Soda Bar	Soccer Mommy
February 6, 2018	Tucson	United States	191 Toole	Soccer Mommy
February 8, 2018	Dallas	United States	Three Links	Soccer Mommy
February 9, 2018	Houston	United States	White Oak Music Hall Upstairs	Soccer Mommy
February 10, 2018	Austin	United States	Antone's	Soccer Mommy
February 12, 2018	Birmingham	United States	Syndicate Lounge	Soccer Mommy
February 14, 2018	Nashville	United States	High Watt	Soccer Mommy
February 15, 2018	Atlanta	United States	Aisle 5	Soccer Mommy
February 16, 2018	Asheville	United States	The Mothlight	Soccer Mommy
February 17, 2018	Raleigh	United States	King's	Soccer Mommy
February 20, 2018	Washington D.C.	United States	Rock & Roll Hotel	Soccer Mommy
February 21, 2018	Philadelphia	United States	World Cafe Live	Soccer Mommy
February 23, 2018	Brooklyn	United States	Music Hall of Williamsburg	Soccer Mommy
February 24, 2018	Boston	United States	Great Scott	Soccer Mommy
February 25, 2018	Burlington	United States	Higher Ground	Francesca Blanchard
February 27, 2018	Montreal	Canada	Belmont	Loïc April
February 28, 2018	Toronto	Canada	The Velvet Underground	Common Holly
March 1, 2018	Pontiac	United States	Pike Room	Shortly
April 4, 2018	Salt Lake City	United States	Kilby Court	Harrison Whitford
April 6, 2018	Denver	United States	Gothic Theatre	Daddy Issues
April 7, 2018	Omaha	United States	O'Leaver's Pub	Daddy Issues, McCarthy Trenching
April 9, 2018	Kansas City	United States	Record Bar	Daddy Issues
April 10, 2018	St. Louis	United States	Blueberry Hill Duck Room	Daddy Issues
April 11, 2018	Louisville	United States	Zanzabar	Daddy Issues
April 13, 2018	Columbus	United States	The Basement	Daddy Issues
April 14, 2018	Cleveland	United States	The Beachland Ballroom	Harrison Whitford
April 15, 2018	Bloomington	United States	The Bishop	Lomelda
April 18, 2018	Chicago	United States	Lincoln Hall	Lomelda
April 19, 2018	Madison	United States	The Frequency	Lomelda
April 20, 2018	Minneapolis	United States	Turf Club	Lomelda
April 24, 2018	Vancouver	Canada	The Cobalt	Lomelda
April 25, 2018	Portland	United States	Doug Fir Lounge	Lomelda
April 27, 2018	San Francisco	United States	Bottom of the Hill	Lomelda, Harrison Whitford
Leg 2 - United Kingdom
May 20, 2018	Glasgow	Scotland	St Lukes	Harrison Whitford
May 22, 2018	Liverpool	England	Leaf	Harrison Whitford
May 23, 2018	London	England	Islington Assembly Hall	Harrison Whitford
Leg 3 - Australia
February 12, 2019	Sydney	Australia	Oxford Art Factory	Christian Lee Hutson
February 13, 2019	Sydney	Australia	Oxford Art Factory	Christian Lee Hutson
February 15, 2019	Brisbane	Australia	The Zoo	Pool Shop, Christian Lee Hutson
February 17, 2019	Melbourne	Australia	Croxton Bandroom	Christian Lee Hutson
