= The Lost Tour =

2026 concert tour by Phoebe Bridgers

- Tour by Phoebe Bridgers
- Associated album: Lost Weekend
- Start date: September 14, 2026
- End date: May 13, 2027
- Legs: 3
- No. of shows: 72

Phoebe Bridgers concert chronology
- The Tour (2023); The Lost Tour (2026-2027)

The Lost Tour is the ongoing third solo headlining tour from American musician Phoebe Bridgers, promoting her third studio album, Lost Weekend (2026).

The band members who will be performing with Phoebe Bridgers consists of: Yi-Mei Templeman playing cello, Micah Preite playing guitar, Lily Belknap Honigberg playing fiddle, Nick White playing keys, and Connor Vance playing mandolin and violin. The tour began on September 14, 2026 in Indianapolis, Indiana and will conclude on May 13, 2027 in Mexico City, Mexico. The tour will feature Alex G, Isaac Wood, and Anaïs as the opening acts. The tour's United States and United Kingdom shows sold out by June 2026. Bridgers announced a second North American leg for 2027 on November 12.

The tour will be completely phone free, utilizing Yondr pouches.

== Setlist ==
This setlist is representative of the show on October 28, 2026, in Salt Lake City. It does not represent all dates throughout the tour.

1. "The Outside"
2. "Motion Sickness"
3. "Kill Me"
4. "The Governor's Waltz"
5. "Lost Boys"
6. "DVD Menu"
7. "Garden Song"
8. "Moon Song"
9. "Liberty Tree"
10. "Panorama"
11. "Lost Weekend"
12. "Funeral"
13. "Graceland Too"
14. "Haunted"
15. "Still Standing"
16. "As Above"
17. "Bobby"
18. "On Video"
19. "Georgia"
20. "Waiting Room"
21. "I Can't Wait"
22. "Punisher"
23. "Kyoto"
24. "I Know the End"
25. "Lost Weekend (Reprise)"
26. "Scott Street"
27. "Never Going Back!"

== Tour dates ==
List of scheduled concerts, showing date, city, country, venue, and opening acts
Date (2026)	City	Country	Venue	Opening act(s)
September 14	Indianapolis	United States	Gainbridge Fieldhouse	Alex G
September 15	Indianapolis	United States	Gainbridge Fieldhouse	Alex G
September 17	Saint Paul	United States	Grand Casino Arena	Alex G
September 18	Chicago	United States	United Center	Alex G
September 19	Chicago	United States	United Center	Alex G
September 22	Columbus	United States	Nationwide Arena	Alex G
September 24	Brooklyn	United States	Barclays Center	Alex G
September 25	Brooklyn	United States	Barclays Center	Alex G
September 26	Brooklyn	United States	Barclays Center	Alex G
September 28	Philadelphia	United States	Xfinity Mobile Arena	Alex G
September 29	Washington, D.C.	United States	Capital One Arena	Alex G
October 1	Toronto	Canada	Scotiabank Arena	Alex G
October 2	Toronto	Canada	Scotiabank Arena	Alex G
October 3	Detroit	United States	Little Caesars Arena	Alex G
October 6	Boston	United States	TD Garden	Alex G
October 7	Boston	United States	TD Garden	Alex G
October 9	Charlotte	United States	Spectrum Center	Alex G
October 10	Nashville	United States	Bridgestone Arena	Alex G
October 11	Nashville	United States	Bridgestone Arena	Alex G
October 13	Atlanta	United States	State Farm Arena	Alex G
October 16	Austin	United States	Moody Center	Alex G
October 17	Fort Worth	United States	Dickies Arena	Alex G
October 19	Denver	United States	Ball Arena	Alex G
October 21	Salt Lake City	United States	Delta Center	Alex G
October 23	Seattle	United States	Climate Pledge Arena	Alex G
October 24	Vancouver	Canada	Rogers Arena	Alex G
October 27	San Francisco	United States	Chase Center	Alex G
October 28	San Francisco	United States	Chase Center	Alex G
October 30	Inglewood	United States	Intuit Dome	Alex G
October 31	Inglewood	United States	Intuit Dome	Alex G
November 1	Inglewood	United States	Intuit Dome	Alex G
November 23	Dublin	Ireland	3Arena	Isaac Wood; Anaïs
November 24	Dublin	Ireland	3Arena	Isaac Wood; Anaïs
November 26	Manchester	United Kingdom	Co-op Live	Isaac Wood; Anaïs
November 27	Glasgow	United Kingdom	OVO Hydro	Isaac Wood; Anaïs
November 28	Birmingham	United Kingdom	Bp pulse LIVE	Isaac Wood; Anaïs
December 1	London	United Kingdom	The O2 Arena	Isaac Wood; Anaïs
December 2	London	United Kingdom	The O2 Arena	Isaac Wood; Anaïs
December 4	Paris	France	Adidas Arena	Isaac Wood; Anaïs
December 6 (Note: The date for this show was changed from Decemeber 5.)	Antwerp (Note: The location for this show was changed from Brussels.)	Belgium	AFAS Dome (Note: The venue for this show was changed from Forest National)	Isaac Wood; Anaïs
December 7	Amsterdam	Netherlands	Ziggo Dome	Isaac Wood; Anaïs
December 8	Düsseldorf	Germany	PSD Bank Dome (Note: This venue was upgraded from Mitsubishi Electric Halle due to demand.)	Isaac Wood; Anaïs
December 10 (Note: The date for this show was changed from Decemeber 9.)	Berlin	Germany	Uber Arena (Note: The venue for this show was changed from Velodrom)	Isaac Wood; Anaïs
December 11	Copenhagen	Denmark	Royal Arena	Isaac Wood; Anaïs
December 12	Stockholm	Sweden	Avicii Arena	Isaac Wood; Anaïs

List of scheduled concerts, showing date, city, country, venue, and opening acts
Date (2027)	City	Country	Venue	Opening act(s)
February 17	Portland	United States	Moda Center	Grouper
February 18	Spokane	United States	Numerica Veterans Arena	Grouper
February 20	Edmonton	Canada	Rogers Place	Paper Wings
February 21	Edmonton	Canada	Rogers Place	Paper Wings
February 23	Winnipeg	Canada	Canada Life Centre	Paper Wings
February 26	Kansas City	United States	T-Mobile Center	Paper Wings
February 28	Oklahoma City	United States	Paycom Center	Paper Wings
March 2	Lincoln	United States	Pinnacle Bank Arena	Paper Wings
March 4	Milwaukee	United States	Fiserv Forum	Paper Wings
March 6	Grand Rapids	United States	Van Andel Arena	Paper Wings
March 7	Cleveland	United States	Rocket Arena	Paper Wings
March 9	Raleigh	United States	Lenovo Center	Paper Wings
March 10	Baltimore	United States	CFG Bank Arena	Paper Wings
March 12	Pittsburgh	United States	PPG Paints Arena	Paper Wings
March 16	Newark	United States	Prudential Center	Paper Wings
March 17	Newark	United States	Prudential Center	Paper Wings
March 19	State College	United States	Bryce Jordan Center	Paper Wings
March 21	Hamilton	Canada	TD Coliseum	Paper Wings
March 23	Montreal	Canada	Bell Centre	Paper Wings
March 25	Ottawa	Canada	Canadian Tire Centre	Paper Wings
April 10 (Note: The concert is part of Coachella Valley Music and Arts Festival)	Indio	United States	Empire Polo Club	—N/a
April 17	Indio	United States	Empire Polo Club	—N/a
April 22	Tampa	United States	Benchmark International Arena	Christian Lee Hutson
April 24	Miami	United States	Kaseya Center	Christian Lee Hutson
April 27	Orlando	United States	Kia Center	Christian Lee Hutson
May 4	San Antonio	United States	Frost Bank Center	Christian Lee Hutson
May 13	Mexico City	Mexico	Palacio de los Deportes	Christian Lee Hutson
