= Phoebe Bridgers =

American singer and songwriter (born 1994)

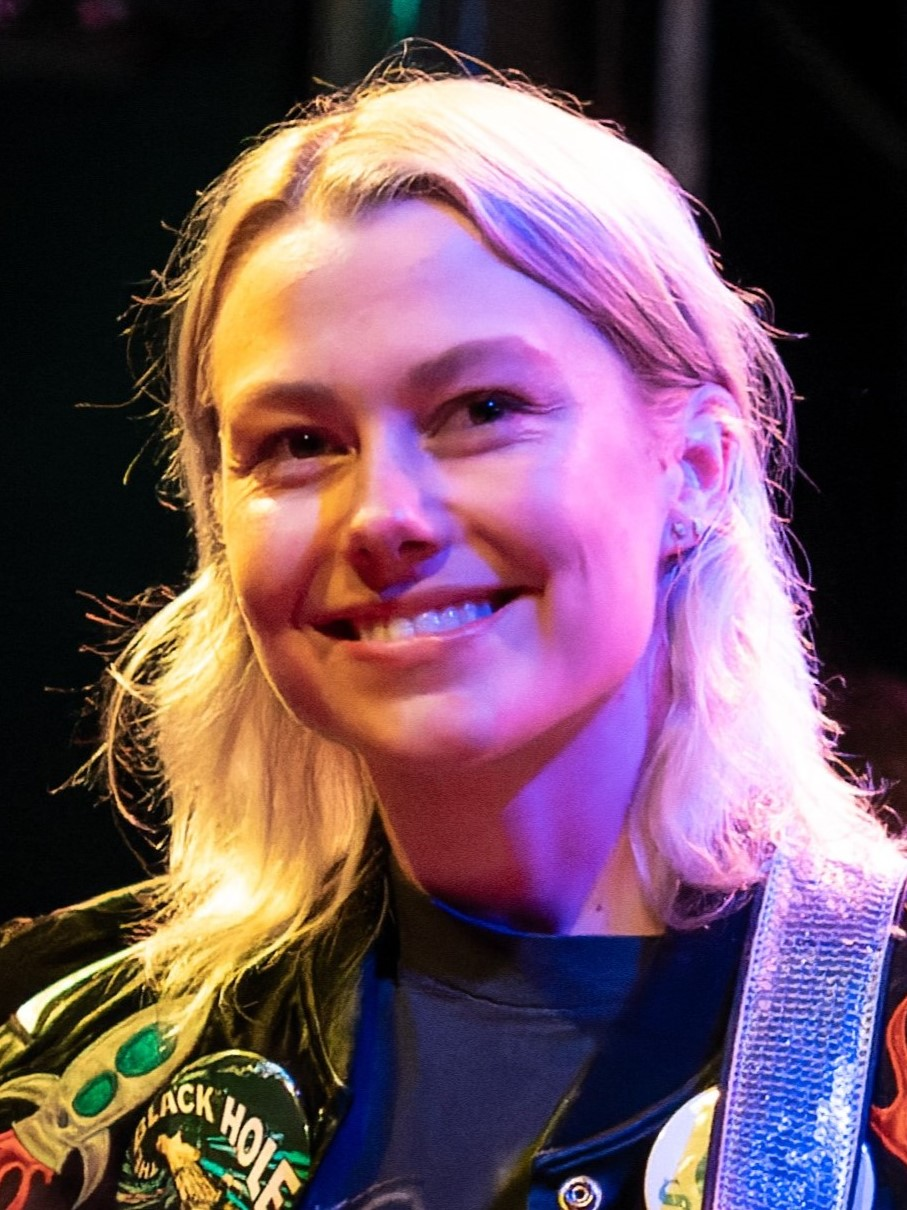
- Bridgers in 2023

Background information
- Born: Phoebe Lucille Bridgers; August 17, 1994 (age 32); Pasadena, California, U.S.
- Genres: Indie folk; indie rock; indie pop; emo folk
- Occupations: Singer; songwriter; musician; record producer
- Instruments: Vocals; guitar; bass guitar; keyboards
- Years active: 2007–present
- Labels: PAX AM; Dead Oceans; Interscope; Matador; Saddest Factory
- Member of: Boygenius (Note: The group is on indefinite hiatus.)
- Formerly of: Sloppy Jane; Better Oblivion Community Center
- Partner: Bo Burnham (2022–present)
- Website: phoebebridgers.com

Phoebe Lucille Bridgers (born August 17, 1994) is an American singer-songwriter, record producer, and actress. Her indie folk music typically centers on acoustic guitar and electronic production, with melancholic lyrical themes. She has won four Grammy Awards.

Bridgers has performed music since her youth and was a member of Sloppy Jane. She released her debut solo album, Stranger in the Alps, in 2017, followed by Punisher (2020) and Lost Weekend (2026), all of which received critical acclaim. She is also a member of the supergroup Boygenius, with which she released a self-titled EP in 2018, followed by its debut album The Record and the EP The Rest in 2023. She was also a member of Better Oblivion Community Center with Conor Oberst of Bright Eyes, with whom she released a self-titled album and two singles.

Bridgers has been featured on tracks with Taylor Swift, the 1975, The Killers, Muna, SZA, Kid Cudi, Christian Lee Hutson, Shame, Lord Huron, and the National.

== Early life ==
Phoebe Lucille Bridgers was born on August 17, 1994, in Pasadena, California. Her mother, Jamie, works in real estate and stand-up comedy, while her father, Tony, was a film and television set builder. She has a younger brother named Jackson. Her parents divorced when she was 19 years old. She was raised in Pasadena, but also spent some of her childhood in Ukiah, California. As a child, she made extra money by busking at the Pasadena Farmers Market, and started playing guitar around the age of 13. In 2009, she graduated from the Sequoyah School and began studying vocal jazz at the Los Angeles County High School for the Arts, graduating in 2013. In 2011, Bridgers attended the California State Summer School for the Arts, where she studied music. She was then accepted by the Berklee College of Music in Boston, but dropped out after student orientation to focus on her music career.

== Career ==
=== 2014–2018: Early beginnings and Stranger in the Alps ===
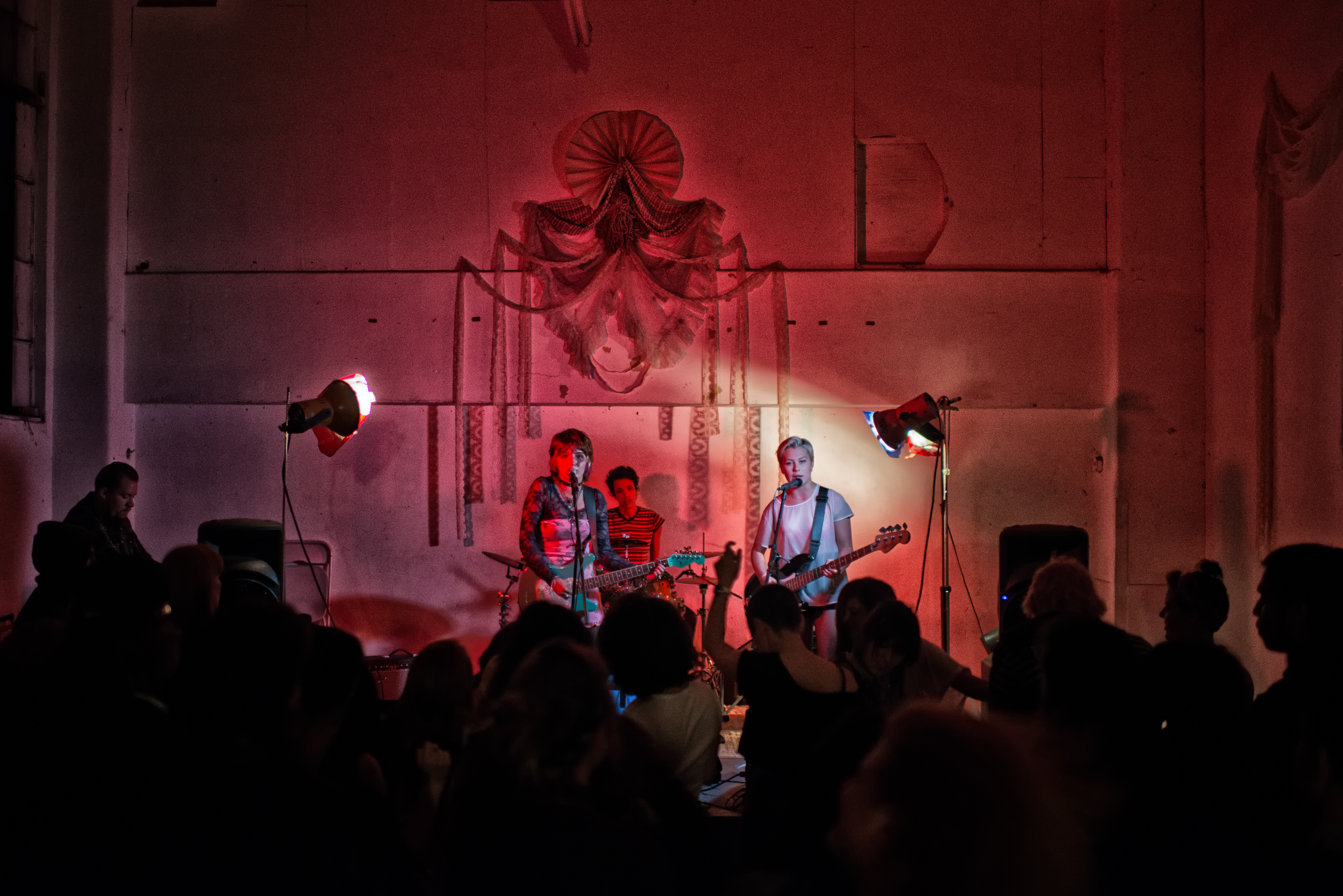
Bridgers (right) performing as part of Sloppy Jane in 2013

Bridgers was a member of various groups while in high school, including Einstein's Dirty Secrets and Sloppy Jane, and frequently played solo shows around Los Angeles. After record producer Tony Berg heard her song "Waiting Room", which she wrote at age 16, he offered to produce her first album for free since he believed in her talent so strongly. Making an Apple commercial with Sloppy Jane had given her some financial security, so she planned to complete her record and then sell it to a label, rather than try to get signed first. This allowed her much more time and creative freedom to create what became Stranger in the Alps. Around this time, Bridgers met American singer-songwriter Ryan Adams through mutual collaborators, and he put out her EP Killer on his label PAX AM. Bridgers also supported Julien Baker on her 2016 tour of the East Coast.

In January 2017, Bridgers released the single "Smoke Signals" and opened for Conor Oberst on his European tour. The two had met the previous summer at a secret showcase Oberst organized at the Bootleg Theater in Los Angeles. He and his Bright Eyes bandmate, Mike Mogis, contributed vocals and production to Stranger in the Alps. Bridgers joined The Joy Formidable and Adams for select dates on their respective U.S. tours before playing at South by Southwest in March 2017.

In June 2017, Bridgers signed to independent label Dead Oceans. In September 2017, Bridgers released her debut studio album, Stranger in the Alps, on the label. The album was produced by Tony Berg, Ethan Gruska, and Rob Moose, all of whom became consistent collaborators with Bridgers. To promote the album, Bridgers performed on CBS This Morning and the NPR Tiny Desk. In 2018, many songs from the record appeared in television productions, including Switched at Birth, Castle, Burden of Truth, Lethal Weapon, and Trinkets.

Bridgers has been called a "serial collaborator", and has either been featured on or co-released tracks with Lord Huron, Fiona Apple, Matt Berninger and the National, Andrew Bird, Manchester Orchestra, the 1975, Maggie Rogers, Kid Cudi, Taylor Swift, and SZA, among others. She has participated in full-album projects with Oberst, Julien Baker, and Lucy Dacus.

=== 2018–2019: Boygenius and Better Oblivion Community Center ===
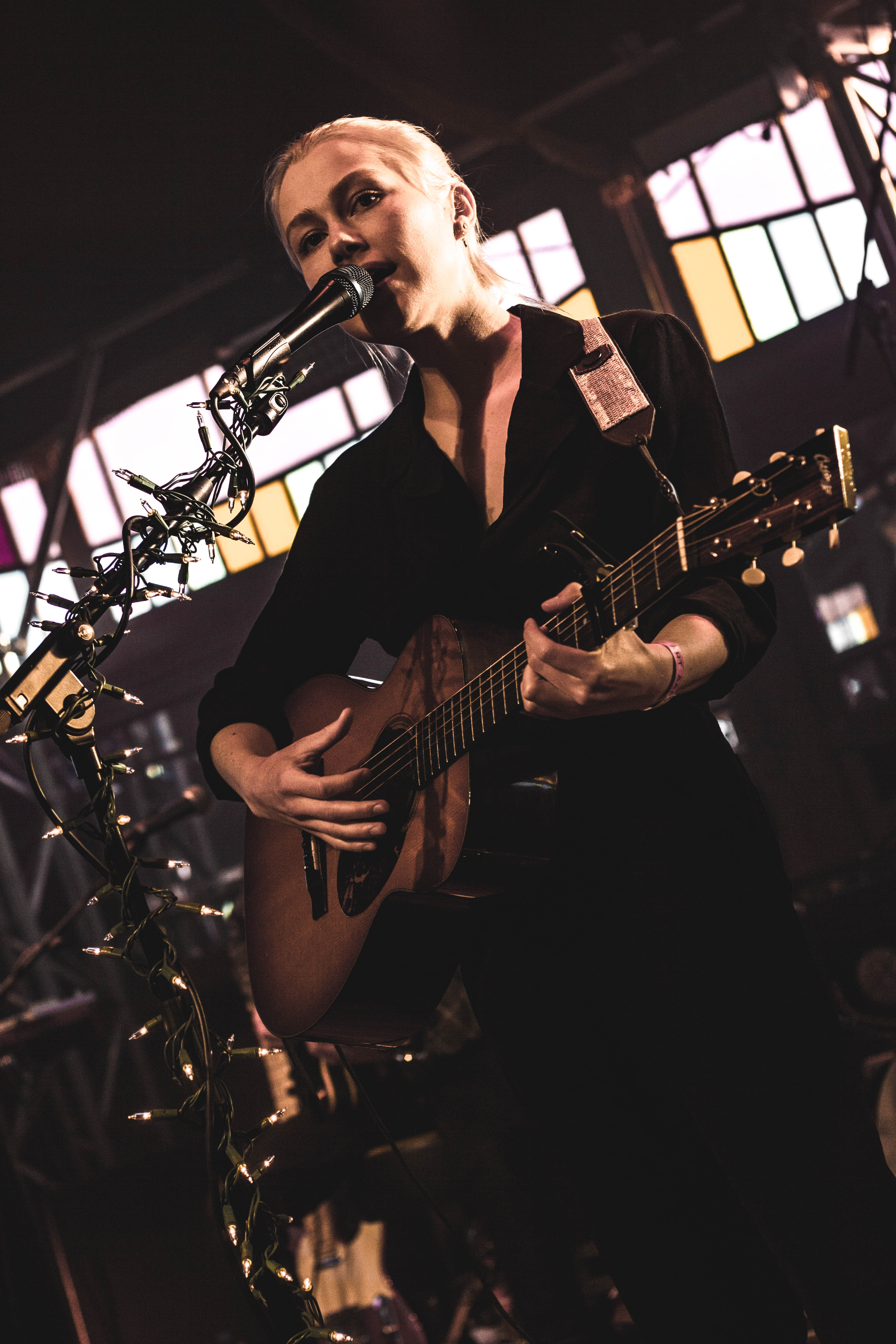
Bridgers performing at the 2018 Haldern Pop Festival

In 2018, Bridgers teamed up with fellow indie singer-songwriters Julien Baker and Lucy Dacus to form the supergroup Boygenius, signed to Matador Records. They released three songs in August 2018 and subsequently announced an eponymous EP, which was released on October 26, 2018, to widespread acclaim. Pitchfork called the collaboration "magic". The band toured the U.S. in November, appearing on Late Night with Seth Meyers and the NPR Tiny Desk.

On December 5, 2018, Bridgers released a Spotify Singles session recorded at Spotify Studios NYC featuring a performance of "Scott Street" and a cover of the Cure's "Friday I'm in Love".

Bridgers and Conor Oberst announced the formation of their band, Better Oblivion Community Center, on The Late Show with Stephen Colbert in January 2019. They released their debut album later that month through Dead Oceans. The band appeared on CBS This Morning, and Bridgers appeared for the third time on NPR's Tiny Desk series. Bob Boilen, creator of the Tiny Desk Concerts, said of their album: "It's that rare musical partnership where each injects vibrancy into the other's creative side."

=== 2020–2022: Punisher ===
On February 26, 2020, Bridgers released the single "Garden Song" alongside its music video. In April, the 1975 released the song "Jesus Christ 2005 God Bless America" with Bridgers, ahead of their studio album Notes on a Conditional Form, which features Bridgers on three tracks. She was slated to tour with them in summer 2020 before the tour's cancellation due to the COVID-19 pandemic. On April 9, 2020, Bridgers released "Kyoto" and announced on Instagram that her second album Punisher would be released on June 19, 2020. Bridgers released the album a day earlier than stated, stating: "I'm not [delaying] the record until things go back to 'normal' because I don't think they should. Here it is a little early." The album received widespread positive reviews. In July 2020, Bridgers released the music video for her single "I Know the End". While working on Punisher, Bridgers also produced Christian Lee Hutson's album Beginners, which was released on Anti- Records in May 2020. That September, she played to an all-virtual audience of 4 million at Red Rocks Amphitheatre as part of their Unpaused Concert Series. In October, Bridgers announced the formation of her own label Saddest Factory, an imprint of Dead Oceans.

While awaiting the results of the 2020 United States presidential election on November 3, Bridgers tweeted that she would cover "Iris" by Goo Goo Dolls if then-president Donald Trump lost. The cover, which was recorded as a duet with Maggie Rogers under the name Phoebe & Maggie, was released exclusively on Bridgers' Bandcamp page for one day only on November 13. The song received 28,000 downloads with proceeds going to Stacey Abrams' Fair Fight Action organization to promote fair elections both in the state of Georgia and nationwide. On November 10, Bridgers announced an EP of four reworked tracks from Punisher, entitled Copycat Killer, in collaboration with Rob Moose. Copycat Killer was released digitally on November 20, 2020. On November 23, she released a cover of Merle Haggard's "If We Make It Through December", with proceeds going to LA's Downtown Women's Center.

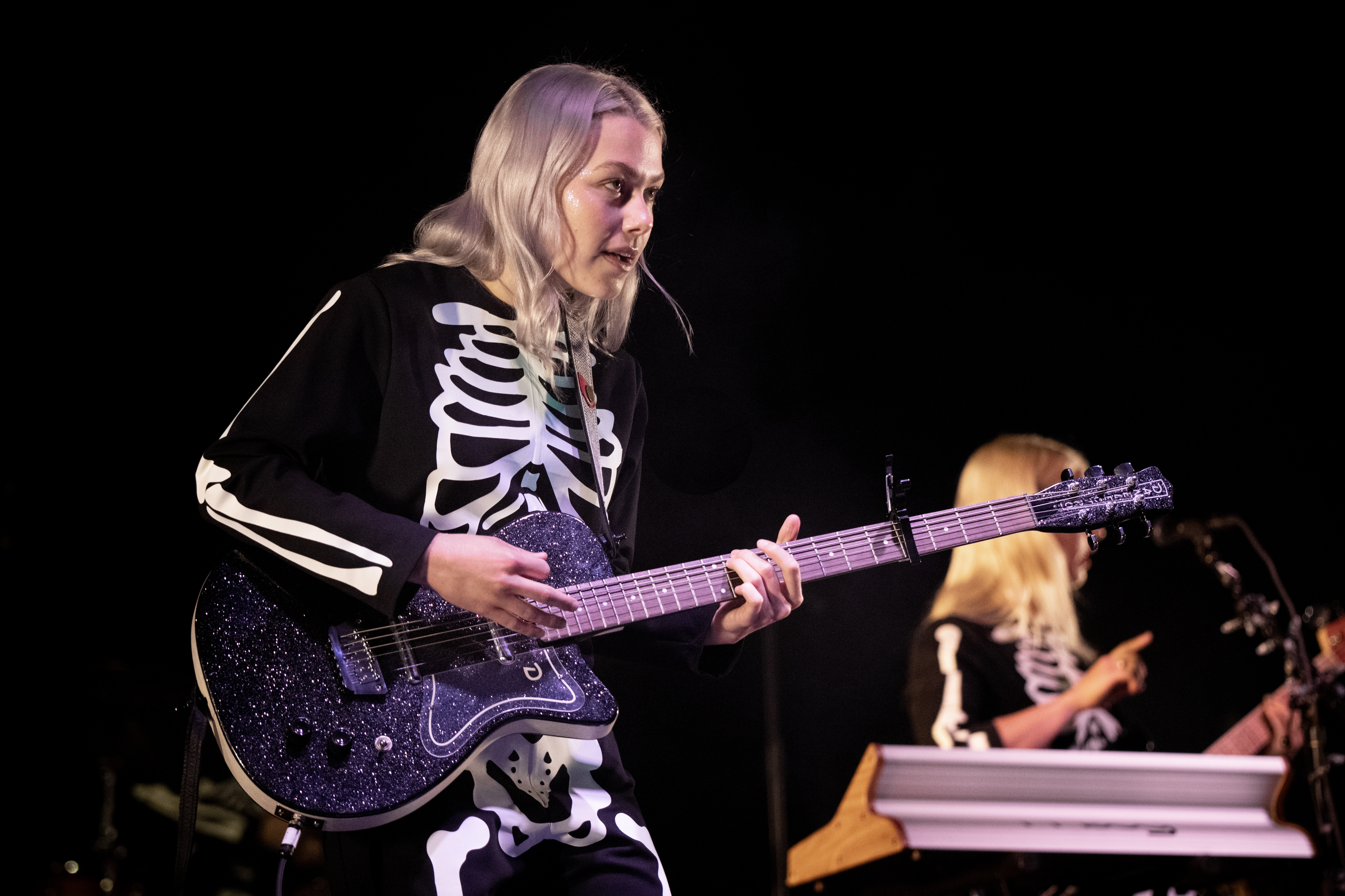
Bridgers performing at the 2021 Shaky Knees Music Festival

Bridgers garnered four nominations at the 63rd Annual Grammy Awards for Best New Artist, Best Rock Performance, Best Rock Song and Best Alternative Music Album. In December 2020, she released a music video for the song "Savior Complex", directed by Phoebe Waller-Bridge and starring Paul Mescal. That same month Bridgers also featured on Kid Cudi's track "Lovin Me", on his album Man on the Moon III: The Chosen (2020), and sang backing vocals on two songs by Charlie Hickey.

Bridgers was a musical guest on the eleventh episode of the 46th season of Saturday Night Live, playing "Kyoto" and "I Know the End" and closing the performance by smashing her guitar on a fake stage monitor. On March 9, 2021, Bridgers released a second Spotify Singles session featuring a cover of John Prine's "Summer's End" and a version of "Kyoto" featuring vocals from Jackson Browne. In August 2021 it was announced that Bridgers would appear on The Killers' album Pressure Machine on the track "Runaway Horses", released August 13. That same month, she released a cover of Metallica's 1991 song "Nothing Else Matters"; the song appeared on the cover album The Metallica Blacklist released the following month as one of 12 covers of the song. She also provided background vocals on five tracks from Lorde's third album, Solar Power, released on August 20.

On September 3, 2021, Bridgers embarked on the Reunion Tour, starting in St. Louis, Missouri. She featured on Muna's single "Silk Chiffon", released September 7 on Saddest Factory. She also featured on the song "Atlantis" from Noah Gundersen's album, A Pillar of Salt, released in October 2021. On October 13, Bridgers' version of Bo Burnham's "That Funny Feeling" opened at No. 2 on both the Rock & Alternative Digital Song Sales, and Alternative Digital Song Sales charts.

On November 12, 2021, Bridgers appeared on Taylor Swift's second re-recorded album Red (Taylor's Version) on the track "Nothing New". The song debuted and peaked at No. 43 on the Billboard Hot 100, becoming Bridgers' highest-peaking entry on the chart. On November 30, she released a cover of "Day After Tomorrow" by Tom Waits, continuing her tradition of releasing a cover for the holidays. Proceeds from the release were donated to an organization supporting refugees and human trafficking victims in California. On December 15, 2021, Bridgers appeared on the true crime comedy podcast My Favorite Murder to discuss her "hometown" crime story: the murder of 16-year-old Marissa Mathy-Zvaifler at the Sunshine Theater.

On April 15, 2022, Bridgers released "Sidelines", a song featured on Conversations with Friends, a Hulu adaptation of Sally Rooney's novel of the same name. On July 8, she released a cover of The Carpenters' 1972 single "Goodbye to Love" for the Minions: The Rise of Gru soundtrack, and on July 12 was announced to be featured on a song titled 'Stonecatcher' on Marcus Mumford's new solo album, Self-Titled. In August 2022, it was announced that Bridgers would star in I Saw the TV Glow, an A24 horror film directed by Jane Schoenbrun and produced by Emma Stone and Dave McCary. Bridgers performed as an opening act on multiple shows of the US leg of Taylor Swift's The Eras Tour. On November 18, 2022, she covered the Handsome Family's song "So Much Wine" on her tradition of releasing a cover for the holidays, with proceeds from the single to benefit the Los Angeles LGBT Center. The song was provided with vocals from Andrew Bird, organist Ethan Gruska, guitarist Harrison Whitford and Bridgers' then-partner, actor Paul Mescal. On December 9, 2022, Bridgers appeared on the track "Ghost in the Machine" with SZA, on her second album SOS. The track would give her her first Grammy award, for Best Pop Duo/Group Performance. In the same month, she performed at two of Danny Elfman's concerts of The Nightmare Before Christmas soundtrack, taking the part of Sally.

=== 2023–2025: Reunion with Boygenius and The Record ===
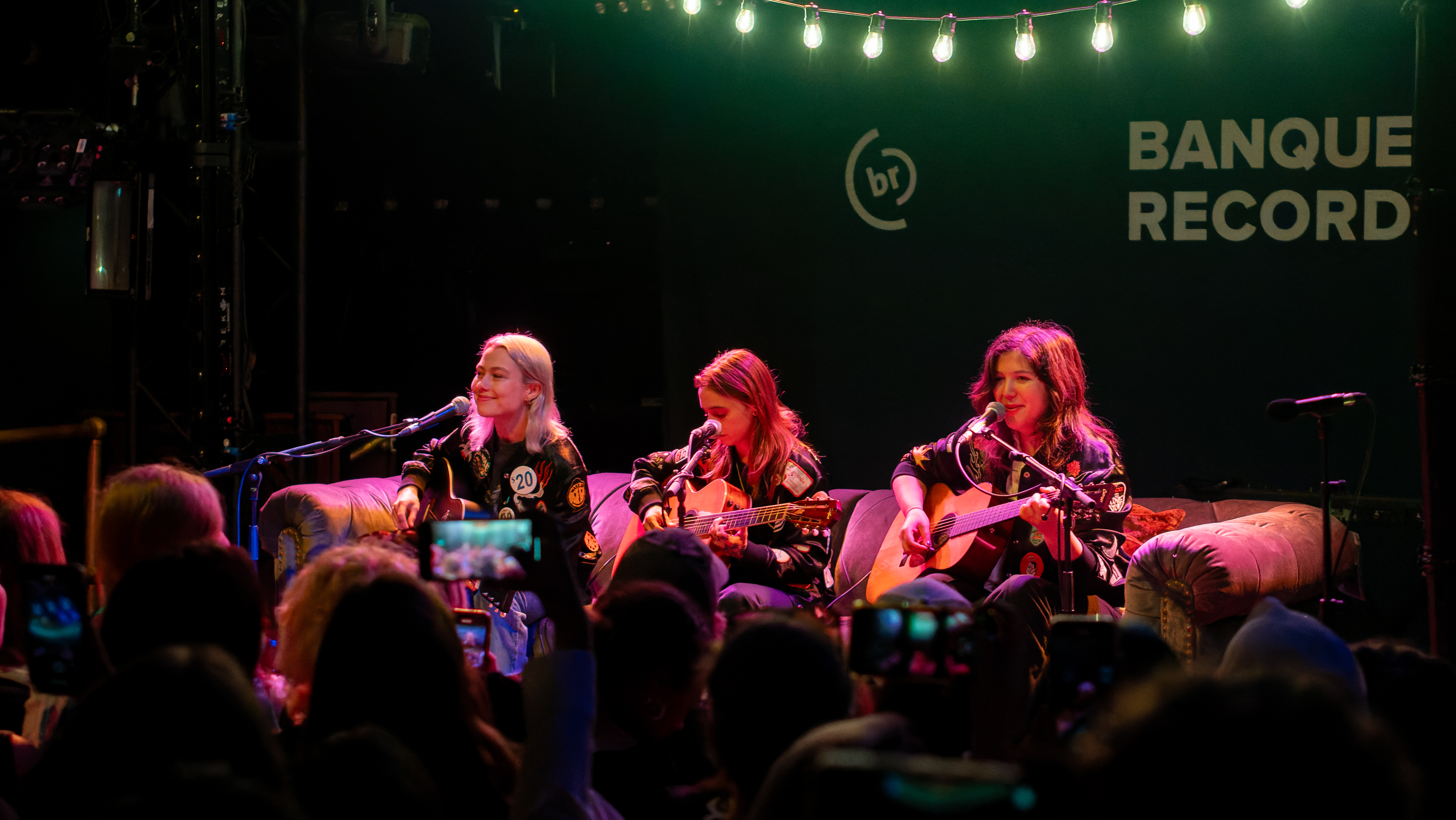
Bridgers playing as part of Boygenius in 2023

In January 2023, Boygenius reunited and announced their debut album The Record, which was released on March 31, and released singles "$20", "True Blue", and "Emily I'm Sorry". In February 2023, Bridgers featured on "Adderall" by English post-punk band and Dead Oceans labelmate Shame, the third single from their third album Food for Worms. She was featured on the tracks "This Isn't Helping" and "Your Mind Is Not Your Friend" from the album First Two Pages of Frankenstein, by the National, released on April 28, 2023. She also features in the music video for the latter, directed by her brother, Jackson Bridgers. She also opened and performed with Taylor Swift in May 2023 in New Jersey. In May 2023, Bridgers released the single "Waiting Room", via Bandcamp, with all proceeds donated to Music Will. Bridgers again collaborated with the National by featuring on the title track of their album Laugh Track, released on September 18, 2023. On February 1, 2024, Boygenius announced at a secret show in Los Angeles that they are going on hiatus. They reportedly said that they were "going away for the foreseeable future". She was the most awarded person at the 66th Annual Grammy Awards, winning three for her work with Boygenius and one for her collaboration with SZA. Following the Grammys, Bridgers revealed she planned to step back and take a break for the remainder of 2024. This hiatus continued through 2025.

=== 2026: Return from hiatus and Lost Weekend ===
On May 7, 2026, Bridgers was announced to be playing a show in Roswell, New Mexico, the following day. The concert was promoted with flyers posted around Roswell, which circulated online. Fans confirmed with the venue that the show was legitimate. Posters indicated that no recording devices would be allowed inside during the concert. On May 9, a show in Lubbock, Texas, was announced for the same night. Attendees at both concerts confirmed that Bridgers performed new music. On May 11, she performed another surprise show in Little Rock, Arkansas.

On June 1, Bridgers announced a surprise concert at Madison Square Garden in New York City on June 4. Tickets for the concert were between $1 and $20, and proceeds went to the Community Justice Exchange's Immigration Bond Freedom Fund. In a review of the show, Variety described it as "possibly the biggest [phone-free concert] ever".

On June 5, Bridgers announced a tour of North America and Europe, called The Lost Tour. Like the concert at Madison Square Garden, Bridgers stated that phones would not be allowed on the tour.

Throughout the tour she had featured many guests such as Billie Eilish and Boygenius. The tour has also sparked many new online trends like fans drawing and posting scenes from the concert due to the inability to post photos as well as buying merch as the only proof of their presence at the shows.

Bridgers' third album, Lost Weekend, was released on August 14, 2026. Its lead single, "Lost Boys", was released on June 25 alongside a music video directed by Pablo Rochat and Lance Oppenheim. Oppenheim also directed the film Primetime (2026), which marks Bridgers' acting debut. Her Primetime co-star Skyler Gisondo also appears in the "Lost Boys" music video. She would also contribute to the soundtrack to Primetime with the song "On Video".

== Artistry and themes ==
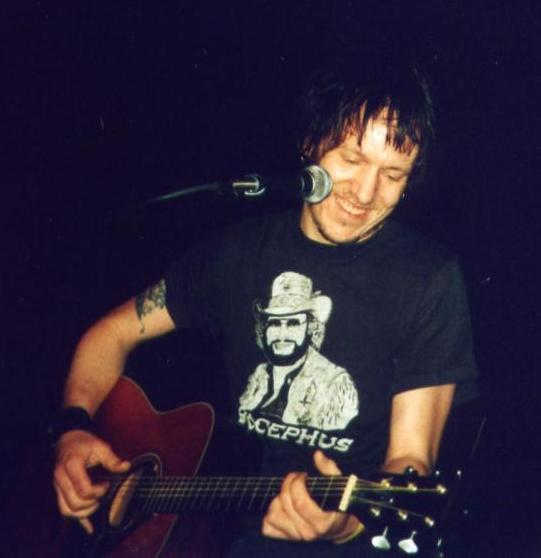
Bridgers has cited Elliott Smith as the greatest inspiration on her songwriting and production style.

Bridgers's musical style has been variously categorized as pop, indie rock, indie folk, emo-folk, indie emo and indie pop. It often centers acoustic guitar, and incorporates atmospheric strings, production and electronic instrumentation. Her music has been described as "anxious", "melancholy" and "haunting". Themes include death, trauma, therapy, depression and strained relationships, "undercut by her dry wit" and "straightforward delivery." Several of Bridgers's songs are about personal issues. For example, "Kyoto" was inspired by her relationship with her father, while "Motion Sickness" and "ICU" are about past breakups. Her complex storytelling and use of evocative imagery, such as in "Garden Song", have also been commended.

She sings in the soprano vocal range.

Bandmate Lucy Dacus told guitar magazine Acoustic Guitar that Bridgers plays baritone guitars and employs lower, open guitar tunings such as open C. Dacus said "she plays really delicately and quietly."

Bridgers has cited Elliott Smith as one of her favorite artists and the biggest influence on her songwriting and production style. Other musical influences include bluegrass music, Bright Eyes, the Replacements, Blake Mills, Tom Waits, Avril Lavigne, the Beatles, Jackson Browne, Taylor Swift and Nine Inch Nails. Her music often features a wide variety of popular culture references—the writing of Joan Didion, ASMR videos, television series Fleabag, and true crime podcast My Favorite Murder all influenced Punisher.

Two of Bridgers's albums contain Halloween-themed visual motifs, with the album covers of Stranger in the Alps and Punisher containing ghost and skeleton imagery, respectively. She is known for wearing variations of a skeleton onesie, inspired by her reported love for "creepy and corny stuff". Her fans are often called "Pharbs", a play on Nicki Minaj fans calling themselves "Barbs".

== Political views and activism ==
Bridgers is associated with American progressivism. Bridgers, Fiona Apple, and Matt Berninger released a cover of Simon and Garfunkel's 1966 song "7 O'Clock News/Silent Night" updated to reflect events in 2019, including the murder of Botham Jean, the opioid epidemic in the United States, and the testimony of Mick Mulvaney in President Donald Trump's first impeachment trial.

In 2020, Bridgers expressed support for and encouraged people to give donations to racial justice charities via her website and called for the abolition of police during Punisher's release amid the George Floyd protests and released her and Maggie Rogers's cover of "Iris" as a single to raise money for Stacey Abrams's Fair Fight Action, having vowed to release the cover if Trump lost the 2020 United States presidential election.

In October 2020, Bridgers performed as part of the virtual fundraiser festival "Village of Love" benefiting Planned Parenthood in Los Angeles and New York. At SXSW in 2022, Bridgers and Caleb Hearon criticized Greg Abbott's position on gender-affirming care for children and invited progressive politician Greg Casar to the stage. At a May 2022 concert in Florida after the passage of Florida House Bill 1557, Bridgers repeatedly expressed disdain for Ron DeSantis.

Following the death of Queen Elizabeth II in September 2022, Bridgers shared a post from another account on Instagram that mourned the victims of colonialism during the queen's reign while calling her a war criminal.

At Coachella in April 2023, Boygenius spoke in support of trans rights following bills proposed in states like Florida and Missouri.

Bridgers advocates for abortion legality. In a 2022 interview with Teen Vogue, she expressed disdain for the overturning of Roe v. Wade. In May 2022, following the leaked Supreme Court draft opinion overturning Roe v. Wade, she said that she had an abortion in October 2021 and said everyone should have the right to do so.

After winning multiple awards at the 66th Grammy Awards, Bridgers called out Neil Portnow, ex-president of the Recording Academy, criticizing his remarks about women musical artists and highlighting accusations he engaged in sexual violence. In closing, she said "to him, I'd like to say I know you're not dead yet, but when you are, rot in piss." Also at the 66th Grammy Awards, Bridgers's red carpet outfit, coordinated with the other members of Boygenius, featured Artists4Ceasefire pins calling for a ceasefire in the Israeli invasion of Gaza.

== Personal life ==
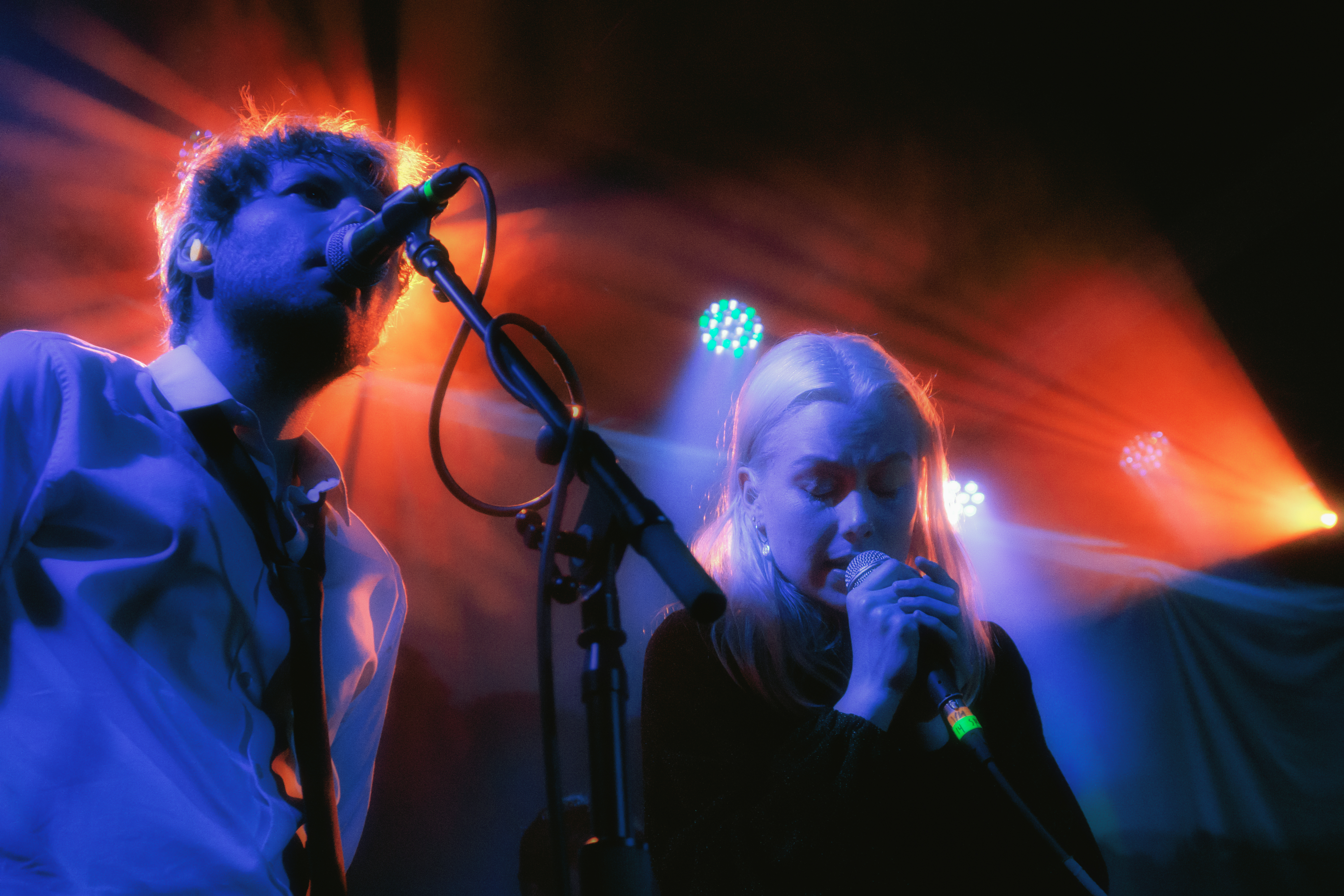
Bridgers and Vore performing at The Crocodile in 2018

Bridgers is bisexual and an advocate for LGBTQ+ rights. She was a pescetarian for many years, something her school peers mocked her for, but is now vegan. Bridgers has spoken about her struggles with depression and anxiety, for which she has had therapy.

Bridgers and American musician Ryan Adams started a relationship in 2014, while he was still married to actress/singer Mandy Moore. Her song "Motion Sickness" is about their relationship. Bridgers and six other women accused Adams of emotional abuse in a 2019 report by The New York Times. Bridgers later dated American musician Marshall Vore, who works as her touring drummer and has collaborated with her on other music; they co-wrote her single "ICU" about their relationship, and remain friends and collaborators. From 2020 to December 2022, she was in a relationship with Irish actor Paul Mescal, to whom she was reportedly engaged. Since October 2022, Bridgers has been dating comedian Bo Burnham.

== Discography ==
Solo studio albums

- Stranger in the Alps (2017)
- Punisher (2020)
- Lost Weekend (2026)

Better Oblivion Community Center

- Better Oblivion Community Center (2019)

Boygenius

- The Record (2023)

== Tours ==
=== Headlining ===
- Farewell Tour (2017–2018)
- 2018 Tour with Boygenius (2018)
- 2019 Tour with Better Oblivion Community Center (2019)
- Reunion Tour (2021–2023)
- The Tour with Boygenius (2023)
- The Lost Tour (2026)

=== Opening act ===
- Music for Cars tour with the 1975 (2020, cancelled due to COVID-19 pandemic)
- The Eras Tour with Taylor Swift (2023)

== Filmography ==
Year	Title	Role	Notes	Ref.
2019	Between Two Ferns: The Movie	Herself	Cameo	
2024	I Saw the TV Glow	Herself/Band member	Cameo	
2026	Primetime	Del Harvey		

== Awards and nominations ==
Year	Association	Category	Nominated work	Result	Ref
2018	AIM Awards	Independent Album of the Year	Stranger in the Alps	Nominated	
2018	AIM Awards	Independent Track of the Year	"Motion Sickness"	Nominated	
2018	AIM Awards	Independent Breakthrough of the Year	Herself	Won	
2018	Libera Awards	Best American Roots & Folk Album	Stranger in the Alps	Nominated	
2019	AIM Awards	Best Independent Album	Better Oblivion Community Center	Nominated	
2020	Libera Awards	Marketing Genius	Better Oblivion Community Center	Nominated	
2021	Grammy Awards	Best New Artist	Herself	Nominated	
2021	Grammy Awards	Best Rock Performance	"Kyoto"	Nominated	
2021	Grammy Awards	Best Rock Song	"Kyoto"	Nominated	
2021	Grammy Awards	Best Alternative Music Album	Punisher	Nominated	
2021	UK Music Video Awards	Best Alternative Video – International	"I Know the End"	Nominated	
2021	GLAAD Media Awards	Outstanding Breakthrough Artist	Punisher	Nominated	
2021	Libera Awards	Record of the Year	Punisher	Won	
2021	Libera Awards	Best Alternative Rock Record	Punisher	Won	
2021	Libera Awards	Marketing Genius	Punisher	Nominated	
2021	Libera Awards	Video of the Year	"Savior Complex"	Nominated	
2021	Libera Awards	Best Live/Livestream Act	Herself	Won	
2021	AIM Awards	Best Independent Album	Punisher	Nominated	
2022	Libera Awards	Best Sync Usage	"I Know the End" in Mare of Easttown episode 6	Won	
2023	Libera Awards	Best Live/Livestream Act	Glastonbury 2022	Nominated	
2024	Grammy Awards	Record of the Year	"Not Strong Enough" (Note: Nominated as a member of boygenius.)	Nominated	
2024	Grammy Awards	Best Rock Song	"Not Strong Enough"	Won	
2024	Grammy Awards	Best Rock Performance	"Not Strong Enough"	Won	
2024	Grammy Awards	Album of the Year	The Record	Nominated	
2024	Grammy Awards	Best Alternative Music Album	The Record	Won	
2024	Grammy Awards	Best Pop Duo/Group Performance	"Ghost in the Machine" (with SZA)	Won	
2024	Grammy Awards	Best Alternative Music Performance	"Cool About It"	Nominated	
2024	Brit Awards	International Group	boygenius	Won	
2027	Grammy Awards	Album of the Year	Lost Weekend	Pending	
2027	Grammy Awards	Best Alternative Music Album	Lost Weekend	Pending	
2027	Grammy Awards	Best Rock Performance	"Lost Boys"	Pending	
2027	Grammy Awards	Best Rock Song	"Lost Boys"	Pending	
2027	Grammy Awards	Best Music Video	"Lost Boys"	Pending	
2027	Grammy Awards	Best Alternative Music Performance	"Kill Me"	Pending	
2027	Grammy Awards	Best Arrangement, Instrumental and Vocals	"The Governer's Waltz"	Pending	
