= Lost Boys (Phoebe Bridgers song) =

2026 single by Phoebe Bridgers

Single by Phoebe Bridgers

from the album Lost Weekend
- Released: June 25, 2026
- Genre: Indie pop; folk rock
- Length: 4:14
- Label: Dead Oceans
- Songwriters: Phoebe Bridgers; Christian Lee Hutson; Marshall Vore; Bo Burnham; Alex G
- Producers: Phoebe Bridgers; Jack Antonoff; Tony Berg; Ethan Gruska; Alex G

Phoebe Bridgers singles chronology
"Claw Machine" (2024)	"Lost Boys" (2026)

Music video
- "Lost Boys" on YouTube

"Lost Boys" is a song by American singer-songwriter Phoebe Bridgers, released on June 25, 2026 as the lead single from her third studio album, Lost Weekend (2026). Bridgers wrote the song alongside Christian Lee Hutson, Marshall Vore, Bo Burnham and Alex G, and produced it with Jack Antonoff, Tony Berg, Ethan Gruska and Alex G.

== Composition ==
"Lost Boys" is an indie pop and folk rock song. It opens with brief passage of vocals filtered through a vocoder, before Bridgers begins singing. The instrumentation includes acoustic and electric guitars, drums, mandolin and synths, as well as "celebratory" trumpets that have been considered reminiscent of her song "Kyoto". Lyrically, Bridgers likens emotionally immature men to the Lost Boys from Peter Pan (since they never grow up), referring to two of her past lovers; she depicts one of them as extremely reckless, while detailing that the other threw a tantrum and hurt himself with a Shure SM57 microphone. However, she eventually forgives them after sleeping with them, only to find them gone by the time she wakes up.

== Critical reception ==
The song received generally positive reviews. Wren Graves of Consequence considered a successful "comeback single" that demonstrated Bridgers' "undiminished skills and growth", while noting her lyrics remained "cutting" but conveyed a more confident perspective. Tobias Hess of The Fader highlighted the song's "slinky harmonic modulation, nonchalant yet emotive vocals, and her seminal use of specific detail and anecdote, all of which make the song sparkle." Laura Snapes of The Guardian lauded the song's "intricate and old-fashioned" production style, calling it a "rugged upgrade from Bridgers' trademark silvery sound", and the chorus, which she considered the most "room-filling" and "satisfying" of her career. She also lauded the non-linear storytelling on the song.

Some critics gave mixed reviews, feeling the lyrics lacked the depth of Bridgers' earlier work. Walden Green of Pitchfork opined that the song's detached perspective and reliance on "cliché" ideas diminished its impact. Although he praised some of the lyrics, he stated the song overall did not have the lyrical precision of Bridgers' best work. Alex Hudson of Exclaim! opined that "Lost Boys" was not as emotionally powerful as her songs "Kyoto" or "Motion Sickness"; he criticized its lyrics and Peter Pan metaphor as indistinctive, though praising the instrumental contributions, commenting that the "triumphant trumpet" carries the emotional weight of the final chorus.

== Music video ==
The music video was released on the same day as the single. Directed by Lance Oppenheim and Pablo Rochat, it sees Bridgers participating in a LARP at a Renaissance fair (possibly a reference to Oppenheim's docuseries Ren Faire). She plays an elf leading a band of knights, spending time riding in the backseat of a knight's motorcycle. After she has dinner with the knights, they visit a convenience store for snacks. The clerk (played by Skyler Gisondo) becomes smitten with her and practices swordplay with the heavy tools in his basement at home, before joining the knights' ranks. By the end of the video, Bridgers and the knights have a nighttime dance party in the woods. The clip also contains footage from RuneScape, with Bridgers and Gisondo eventually appearing as characters in the game. Bridgers and Gisondo previously worked together and with Oppenheim on his thriller film Primetime (2026).

== Live performances ==
Bridgers performed the song in a surprise appearance on The Tonight Show Starring Jimmy Fallon on July 14, 2026, accompanied by a group of child musicians. Bridgers returned to The Tonight Show the following night to perform an acoustic rendition of the song, this time backed by a band of elderly musicians including Dan Reeder.

== Charts ==
=== Weekly charts ===
Weekly chart performance
Chart (2026)	Peak position
Belgium (Ultratop 50 Flanders)	49
Canada Hot 100 (Billboard)	84
Canada Modern Rock (Billboard Canada)	19
Estonia Airplay (TopHit)	55
Ireland (IRMA)	51
New Zealand Hot Singles (RMNZ)	4
UK Singles (Official Charts)	50
US Billboard Hot 100	85
US Adult Alternative Airplay (Billboard)	1
US Alternative Airplay (Billboard)	20
US Hot Rock & Alternative Songs (Billboard)	21
US Rock & Alternative Airplay (Billboard)	12

=== Monthly charts ===
Monthly chart performance
Chart (2026)	Peak position
Estonia Airplay (TopHit)	69
