= Catherine Marks =

Australian record producer

Catherine Marks is an Australian record producer, mixing engineer and audio engineer. She has worked with such artists as boygenius, Foals, Manchester Orchestra, The Killers, Local Natives, Wolf Alice, Beware of Darkness, The Big Moon, Frank Carter & The Rattlesnakes, The Amazons, Palace, Arno, Howling Bells, Sunset Sons, Alanis Morissette, Rise Against, Divorce, Oscar Lang and Eliza Shaddad.

== Early life ==
Born in Melbourne, Australia. Marks was classically-trained in piano from the age of four and has a master's degree in Architecture.

== Career ==
Marks met the Grammy Award winning record producer Flood, at a Nick Cave concert in Dublin in 2001. After finishing her degree, she moved to London in 2005 to train as an assistant engineer under Flood at Assault and Battery studios in North West London. Marks continued to work closely with Flood on PJ Harvey records White Chalk and Let England Shake, and on the Editors' In This Light & on This Evening.

In 2009, Marks began working alongside the Brit Award-Winning British mixer and producer Alan Moulder, where she did engineering and mixing work on projects including Interpol, Foals, Death Cab for Cutie, The Killers, Ronnie Vannuci and Blonde Redhead.

Marks won the 2016 MPG Awards as Breakthrough Producer of The Year. In 2018, Marks won MPG Producer of the Year. In 2020, Marks won Producer of the Year at the Heavy Music Awards. In 2023, Marks won Producer of the Year at the A&R Awards, hosted by Music Business Worldwide and supported by Abbey Road Studios.

In 2023, Marks co-produced the record, the debut album from supergroup boygenius, composed of Phoebe Bridgers, Lucy Dacus and Julien Baker. Released via Interscope in March 2023, and described as an “instant classic” (NME) the album quickly amassed widespread critical acclaim, receiving 5 star reviews from Rolling Stone, NME, The Guardian, The Independent, and a rating of 90 out of 100 on Metacritic, indicating "universal acclaim". In December 2023, NME crowned the record as their number one album of the year.

The album received seven nominations at the 66th GRAMMY Awards, including Album of the Year, Best Alternative Music Album, and Record of the Year for the single "Not Strong Enough".

the record charted at #1 in the UK, Ireland and Netherlands album charts, and peaked at #4 on the Billboard 200.

== Awards and nominations ==
A&R Awards

Year	Award	Results	Ref
2023	Producer of the Year	Won	

Grammy Awards

Year	Album/Song	Artist	Award	Results	Ref
2016	Moaning Lisa Smile	Wolf Alice	Best Rock Performance	Nominated	
2023	the record	boygenius	Album of the Year	Nominated	
2023	the record	boygenius	Best Alternative Music Album	Won	
2023	the record	boygenius	Best Engineered Album, Non-Classical	Nominated	
2023	Not Strong Enough	boygenius	Record of the Year	Nominated	
2023	Not Strong Enough	boygenius	Best Rock Song	Won	
2023	Not Strong Enough	boygenius	Best Rock Performance	Won	
2023	Cool About It	boygenius	Best Alternative Music Performance	Nominated	

Music Producers Guild (MPG) Awards

Year	Award	Results	Ref
2018	Producer of The Year	Won	
2016	Breakthrough Producer of The Year	Won	

Heavy Music Awards

Year	Award	Results	Ref
2020	Best Producer	Won	

== Selected production/mixing/engineering credits ==
Selected production credits:

- 2026: Natalie Imbruglia - Algorithm - Album (Mixing)
- 2025: Rise Against - Ricochet - Album (Producing)
- 2023: Boygenius - The Record - Album (Producing)
- 2022: Lowertown - I Love to Lie - Album (Producing)
- 2022: EOB - Earth - Album (Additional Production, Programming)
- 2022: The Mysterines - Reeling - Album (Producing)
- 2020: Alanis Morissette - Such Pretty Forks in the Road - co-produced with Alex Hope
- 2019: Frank Turner - ‘’No Mans Land - Album (Producing)
- 2018: The Wombats - Beautiful People Will Ruin Your Life - Album (Co-producing)
- 2017: Mélanie De Biasio - Lilies - Album (Mixing)
- 2017: Manchester Orchestra - A Black Mile To The Surface - Album (Producing, Mixing)
- 2017: The Amazons - Black Magic - Track (Producing, Mixing)
- 2017: Frank Carter & The Rattlesnakes - Modern Ruin - Album (Mixing)
- 2016: The Amazons - Little Something - Track (Producing, Mixing)
- 2016: Beware of Darkness - Are You Real? - Album (Co-Producing, Mixing)
- 2016: Local Natives - Masters - Track (Co-Producing)
- 2016: The Big Moon - Cupid - Track (Producing, Mixing)
- 2016: The Big Moon - Silent Movie Susie - Track (Producing, Mixing)
- 2016: Zack Lopez - One More Day - Track (Mixing)
- 2016: Zack Lopez - Don't Say I Won't - Track (Mixing)
- 2016: The Amazons - Night Driving -Track (Producing, Mixing)
- 2016: April Towers - Silent Fever - Track (Producing, Mixing)
- 2016: April Towers - Losing Youth - Track (Producing, Mixing)
- 2016: Eliza Shaddad - Run - EP (Producing, Mixing)
- 2016: Arno - Human Incognito - Album (Recorded)
- 2015: INHEAVEN - Bitter Town -Track (Producing)
- 2015: The Amazons - Don't You Wanna - EP (Producing, Mixing)
- 2015: Sunset Sons - She Wants - Track (Producing)
- 2015: Fairchild - Nom De Guerre - Track (Producing, Mixing)
- 2015: Baby Strange - California Sun - Track (Producing)
- 2015: Champs - Vamala - Album (Mixing)
- 2015: Sunset Sons - The Fall Line - EP (Producing)
- 2014: Jagaara - Faultline - Track (Producing, Mixing)
- 2014: Wolf Alice - Creature Songs - EP (Producing, Mixing)
- 2014: Findlay - Wolfback - Track (Mixing)
- 2014: Howling Bells - Heartstrings- Album (Co-Producing, Mixing)
- 2014: The Ramona Flowers - Dismantle and Rebuild - Album (Mixing)
- 2014: Fairchild - Sadako - EP (Producing, Mixing)
- 2014: Fairchild - Burning Feet - EP (Producing, Mixing)
- 2014: Meanwhile -Bigger City - Track (Co-Producing, Mixing)
- 2014: Lyon Apprentice - Be Honest, Be Wild, Be Free - EP (Mixing)
- 2013: Buchanan - Human Spring - Album (Producer)
- 2013: Mojo Fury - The Difference Between - Album (Mixing)
- 2013: Mike Marlin - The Murderer - Track (Producer, Mixer)
- 2013: Mike Marlin - Grand Reveal - Album (Mixer)
- 2013: Foals - Holy Fire - Album (Engineering)
- 2012: The Killers - Runaways - Track - (Mix/Engineer)
- 2012: Ride - Live at Brixton Academy: 1992 - (Mixing)
- 2012: A Silent Film - Sand & Snow -Album (Mixing)
- 2012: Mike Marlin - Man On The Ground - (Producing, Mixing, Writer)
