= The Record (Boygenius album) =

2023 studio album by Boygenius

Studio album by Boygenius
- Released: March 31, 2023
- Studios: Shangri-La (Malibu), Sound City Studios (Van Nuys)
- Genres: Indie rock; indie folk
- Length: 42:13
- Label: Interscope
- Producers: Boygenius; Catherine Marks

Boygenius chronology
Boygenius (2018)	The Record (2023)	The Rest (2023)

Julien Baker chronology
Little Oblivions (2021)	The Record (2023)	The Rest (2023)

Phoebe Bridgers chronology
Copycat Killer (2020)	The Record (2023)	The Rest (2023)

Lucy Dacus chronology
Home Video (2021)	The Record (2023)	The Rest (2023)

Singles from The Record
- 1. "$20" / "Emily I'm Sorry" / "True Blue" Released: January 18, 2023; 2. "Not Strong Enough" Released: March 1, 2023; 3. "Cool About It" Released: September 20, 2023

The Record is the debut studio album by American indie rock supergroup Boygenius, consisting of Julien Baker, Phoebe Bridgers, and Lucy Dacus. It was released on March 31, 2023, through Interscope Records.

The Record received critical acclaim, and was awarded perfect scores by the likes of DIY, NME and Rolling Stone. It went on to top the charts in Ireland, the Netherlands, and the United Kingdom, marking the first number-one album for all band members, and peaked at number four on the Billboard 200.

The Record and its tracks received a total of seven nominations at the 66th Annual Grammy Awards, including Album of the Year and Record of the Year. It received three awards, including Best Alternative Music Album.

== Background ==
After releasing their debut self-titled EP Boygenius in 2018, the trio had since been working on their solo projects and had all released their respective albums—Little Oblivions by Julien Baker, Punisher by Phoebe Bridgers, and Home Video by Lucy Dacus—before performing as a group for the first time in 3 years on November 19, 2021. Rumours about a debut album from Boygenius began spreading in late 2022 to 2023, after the trio was spotted in a photoshoot together in November 2022 and after Boygenius was announced to be on the 2023 Coachella lineup on January 10, 2023.

== Release ==
On January 18, 2023, Boygenius announced the album, along with the release of three lead singles, "$20", "Emily I'm Sorry", and "True Blue".

On March 1, 2023, Boygenius released the album's fourth single "Not Strong Enough", along with an accompanying music video edited by Bridgers' brother Jackson Bridgers. The song was sent to adult album alternative and alternative radio in the United States on March 13 and 28, 2023, respectively.

The B-side of the vinyl version of the record ends with a locked groove at the end of "Letter to an Old Poet," resulting in the group repeating the phrase "waiting" until the listener lifts the needle.

== The Film ==
On March 30, 2023, Boygenius released "The Film", a promotional short film for the album, featuring the videos for all three singles, "$20", "Emily I'm Sorry", and "True Blue". The videos are interconnected with visual details.

"The Film" was directed by Kristen Stewart, and was launched with a proper film premiere at the El Rey Theatre, a live music venue in Los Angeles. The premiere was followed by a live Q&A with the band, for the press and fans.

== Touring and promotion ==
The group embarked on two tours to support the album, the Re:SET Concert Series in June 2023, and their own The Tour from April to October 2023. The Tour saw the band notably play Coachella, Pukkelpop in Belgium, Connect Music Festival in the UK and Rock en Seine in France.

The band also performed "Not Strong Enough" on Jimmy Kimmel Live! and during Bridgers' opening set for Taylor Swift's The Eras Tour in Nashville.

== Critical reception ==
Professional ratings
Aggregate scores
Source	Rating
AnyDecentMusic?	8.5/10
Metacritic	90/100
Review scores
Source	Rating
AllMusic	4/5 stars
Clash	7/10
DIY	5/5 stars
Exclaim!	8/10
The Line of Best Fit	8/10
Mojo	4/5 stars
NME	5/5 stars
Pitchfork	8.2/10
Rolling Stone	5/5 stars
Slant Magazine	2.5/5 stars

On review aggregator website Metacritic, The Record holds a score of 90 out of 100, based on reviews from 26 critics, indicating "universal acclaim". A five-star review by NME raved that The Record was an "instant classic" as a result of each Boygenius member "getting to know each other artistically and collaboratively". Rolling Stone wrote that Boygenius were able to "transcend any kind of 'supergroup' cliché" through "recombining their individual styles into a different kind of chemistry for each song". Matthew Neale of Clash praised Lucy Dacus' contributions to the album in particular with tracks "True Blue" and "We're in Love". John Amen of PopMatters wrote, "Democratically curated and effusing a palpable enthusiasm, [The Record] stands as a testimony to the power of aesthetic commonality, enduring friendship, and the magic of teamwork, something we could all use more of these days." Kyle Lemmon of Flood Magazine stated that The Record "just plain rips as an indie-rock record".

=== Year-end lists ===
Numerous critics and publications listed The Record in their year-end ranking of the best albums of 2023, often inside the top-ten.

Select year-end rankings of The Record
Publication/critic	Accolade	Rank	Ref.
Billboard	The 50 Best Albums of 2023	2	
Dazed	The 20 Best Albums of 2023	5	
Entertainment Weekly	The 10 Best Albums of 2023	3	
NME	The Best Albums of 2023	1	
People	Top 10 Albums of 2023	9	
Pitchfork	The 50 Best Albums of 2023	16	
PopMatters	The 30 Best Rock Albums of 2023	2	
Rolling Stone	The 100 Best Albums of 2023	2	
The Independent	The 30 Best Albums of 2023	1	
Variety	The Best Albums of 2023	1	

=== Accolades ===
Accolades for The Record
Association	Year	Nominated Work	Category	Result
Grammy Award	2024	The Record	Album of the Year	Nominated
Grammy Award	2024	The Record	Best Alternative Music Album	Won
Grammy Award	2024	The Record	Best Engineered Album, Non-Classical	Nominated
Grammy Award	2024	"Not Strong Enough"	Record of the Year	Nominated
Grammy Award	2024	"Not Strong Enough"	Best Rock Song	Won
Grammy Award	2024	"Not Strong Enough"	Best Rock Performance	Won
Grammy Award	2024	"Cool About It"	Best Alternative Music Performance	Nominated

== Track listing ==
All tracks are written by Boygenius (Julien Baker, Phoebe Bridgers and Lucy Dacus), except "Leonard Cohen" (written by Boygenius, HoJun Yu and Leonard Cohen) and "Cool About It" (written by Boygenius and Paul Simon).

The Record track listing
No.	Title	Lead vocals	Length
1.	"Without You Without Them"	Dacus; Bridgers; Baker	1:21
2.	"$20"	Baker	3:20
3.	"Emily I'm Sorry"	Bridgers	3:34
4.	"True Blue"	Dacus	4:56
5.	"Cool About It"	Baker; Dacus; Bridgers	3:00
6.	"Not Strong Enough"	Bridgers; Baker; Dacus	3:54
7.	"Revolution 0"	Bridgers	4:17
8.	"Leonard Cohen"	Dacus	1:42
9.	"Satanist"	Baker; Bridgers; Dacus	4:50
10.	"We're in Love"	Dacus	4:54
11.	"Anti-Curse"	Baker	3:18
12.	"Letter to an Old Poet"	Bridgers	3:07
Total length:			42:13

Notes

- "Leonard Cohen" contains a line from "Anthem", written and performed by Leonard Cohen.
- "Letter to an Old Poet" contains interpolations of "Me & My Dog" written and performed by Boygenius.
- In the liner notes of the album, songwriter Paul Simon is thanked for inspiration on "Cool About It".

== Personnel ==
- Boygenius – production, performance
  - Julien Baker
  - Phoebe Bridgers
  - Lucy Dacus
- Catherine Marks – co-production, recording, performance
- Tony Berg – additional production
- Ethan Gruska – additional production, performance
- Melina Duterte – additional production, performance
- Sarah Tudzin – additional production, performance
- Kaushlesh "Garry" Purohit – engineering
- Bobby Mota – engineering
- Owen Lantz – engineering
- Will Maclellan – engineering
- Mike Mogis – mixing
- Pat Sullivan – mastering
- Carla Azar – performance
- Jacob Blizard – performance
- Anna Butterss – performance
- Bobby Gruska – performance
- Rob Moose – performance
- Sebastian Steinberg – performance
- Marshall Vore – performance
- Matt Grubb – album artwork

== The Tour ==
The Tour
- Tour by Boygenius
- Location: North America and Europe
- Associated album: The Record
- Start date: April 13, 2023
- End date: October 31, 2023
- Legs: 3
- No. of shows: 36
- Website: xboygeniusx.com/tour

Boygenius concert chronology
- Julien Baker and Phoebe Bridgers with Lucy Dacus Tour (2018); The Tour (2023)

The Tour is the second concert tour by American indie rock supergroup Boygenius, in support of their debut album The Record. The tour was announced on March 28, 2023, and began on April 13, 2023.

=== Background ===
In 2018, Julien Baker, Phoebe Bridgers, and Lucy Dacus booked a co-headlining tour together, and, after booking the tour, decided to record a six-song EP to help promote the tour. The three ended up forming a band called boygenius, coming on stage together at the end of each show and playing the entire EP. In 2023, the group returned with the announcement of their debut album, The Record. That same month, the group also announced they would be heading out on the Re:SET Concert Series. With the Re:SET Concert Series only hitting select cities, the group announced a proper headlining tour to hit markets not part of the concert series. In February, they announced their first concerts in the United Kingdom and Europe. A final fall US leg of the tour was announced in July including shows at Madison Square Garden and the Hollywood Bowl.

=== Reception ===
Reviewing the opening show in Pomona, Chris Willman of Variety described it as a "galvanizing gig", further commended Boygenius as they "managed to find the ideal balance and blend of voices, personalities and musical sensibilities".

=== Set list ===
This set list is representative of the show on September 28, 2023, in New Haven, Connecticut, United States. It does not represent all dates throughout the tour.

1. "Without You Without Them" (from backstage)
2. "$20"
3. "Satanist"
4. "Emily I'm Sorry"
5. "True Blue"
6. "Cool About It"
7. "Souvenir"
8. "Bite the Hand"
9. "Revolution 0"
10. "Stay Down"
11. "Leonard Cohen"
12. "Please Stay" (Lucy Dacus song)
13. "Favor" (Julien Baker song)
14. "Graceland Too" (Phoebe Bridgers song)
15. "Voyager" (live debut)
16. "We're in Love"
17. "Anti-Curse"
18. "Letter to an Old Poet"
19. "Not Strong Enough"

Encore

1. "Ketchum, ID"
2. "Salt in the Wound"

== Charts ==
=== Weekly charts ===
Weekly chart performance for The Record
Chart (2023)	Peak position
Australian Albums (ARIA)	3
Austrian Albums (Ö3 Austria)	24
Belgian Albums (Ultratop Flanders)	6
Belgian Albums (Ultratop Wallonia)	43
Canadian Albums (Billboard)	11
Danish Albums (Hitlisten)	39
Dutch Albums (Album Top 100)	1
French Albums (SNEP)	126
German Albums (Offizielle Top 100)	8
Irish Albums (Official Charts)	1
New Zealand Albums (RMNZ)	2
Scottish Albums (Official Charts)	1
Spanish Albums (Promusicae)	40
Swedish Albums (Sverigetopplistan)	36
Swiss Albums (Schweizer Hitparade)	22
UK Albums (Official Charts)	1
UK Americana Albums (Official Charts)	1
US Billboard 200	4
US Top Alternative Albums (Billboard)	2
US Americana/Folk Albums (Billboard)	1
US Top Rock Albums (Billboard)	1
US Indie Store Album Sales (Billboard)	2

=== Year-end charts ===
Year-end chart performance for The Record
Chart (2023)	Position
Belgian Albums (Ultratop Flanders)	108
UK Vinyl Albums (OCC)	14
US Top Rock Albums (Billboard)	27

== Certifications and sales ==
Certifications and sales for The Record
Region	Certification	Certified units/sales
Canada (Music Canada)	Gold	40,000^{‡}
New Zealand (RMNZ)	Gold	7,500^{‡}
United Kingdom (BPI)	Gold	104,117
^{‡} Sales+streaming figures based on certification alone.
