= Not Strong Enough =

2023 single by Boygenius

Single by Boygenius

from the album The Record
- Released: March 1, 2023
- Recorded: January 2022
- Studio: Shangri-La (Malibu); Sound City (Van Nuys)
- Genre: Indie rock; folk rock
- Length: 3:54
- Label: Interscope
- Songwriters: Julien Baker; Phoebe Bridgers; Lucy Dacus
- Producers: Boygenius; Catherine Marks

Boygenius singles chronology
| "$20" / "Emily I'm Sorry" / "True Blue" (2023) | "Not Strong Enough" (2023) | "Cool About It" (2023) |

Music video
- "Not Strong Enough" on YouTube

"Not Strong Enough" is a song by the American group Boygenius. Interscope Records released it on March 1, 2023, as the fourth single from the band's debut studio album, The Record (2023). After releasing their extended play, Boygenius (2018), the three members of the band – Julien Baker, Phoebe Bridgers, and Lucy Dacus – faced speculation about whether they would record again as a trio. In response, they wrote much of the material for The Record, including "Not Strong Enough", in secret. It is an indie rock and folk rock song with elements of pop, country, and several other genres. The lyrics primarily concern mental illness and its effects on relationships; they focus on a narrator experiencing contradictory mental states of self-loathing and self-importance. The song features contributions from several session musicians. The band produced it with Catherine Marks.

"Not Strong Enough" appeared on several Billboard rock charts in the United States. These include Adult Alternative Airplay, where it spent seven weeks at number one and was ranked by Billboard as the most successful song of 2023. The song also charted in Ireland and entered a secondary chart in Japan. It is certified gold in New Zealand and silver in the United Kingdom. It garnered widespread critical acclaim; many reviewers lauded the lyrics and the interplay between the band members. Multiple publications deemed it one of the best songs on The Record and of 2023. Music critics analyzed its themes of gender roles and feminism. At the 66th Annual Grammy Awards, the song received nominations for Record of the Year, Best Rock Song, and Best Rock Performance, winning the latter two.

The music video for "Not Strong Enough" chronicles the band spending a day together in various locations around Los Angeles County. The video received praise for its candid depiction of the three musicians' friendship, and for having an uplifting aura that contrasted with the relatively dark subject matter of the lyrics. The band regularly performed the song while touring behind The Record; audiences and reviewers generally considered it to be a highlight of each concert.

== Background and release ==
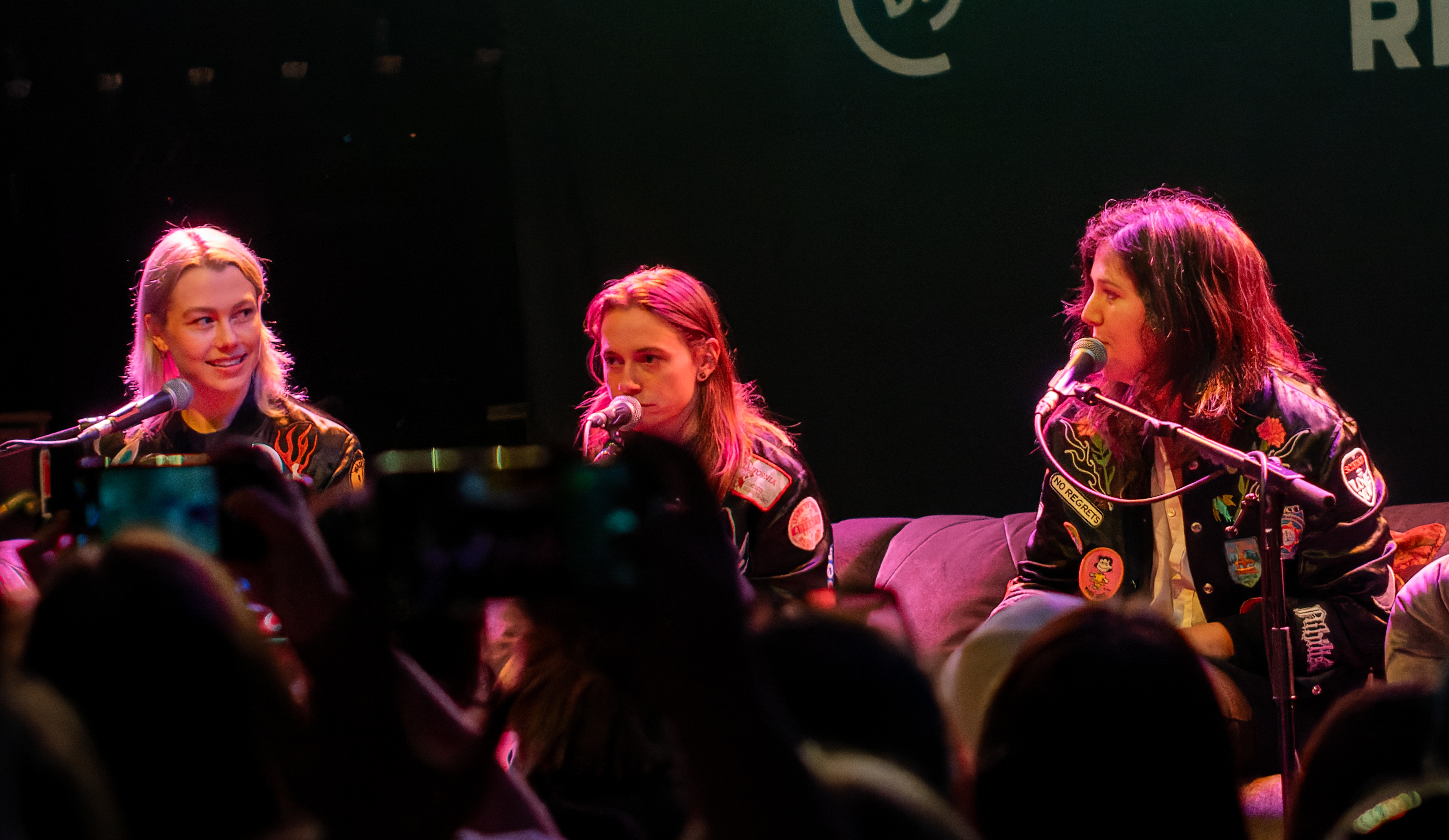
Boygenius performing in Kingston upon Thames in August 2023; Bridgers, Baker, and Dacus appear from left to right

Boygenius is a band consisting of three American singer-songwriters: Julien Baker, Phoebe Bridgers, and Lucy Dacus. The trio formed in 2018 and released the extended play, Boygenius, in October of that year. Each musician then worked on their solo projects, releasing their respective studio albums: Punisher (2020) by Bridgers; Little Oblivions (2021) by Baker; and Home Video (2021) by Dacus. Roughly a week after Punisher's June 2020 release, Bridgers began writing new material to keep herself busy during the COVID-19 lockdowns. The song "Emily I'm Sorry" originated during this period; Bridgers sent a demo of it to Dacus and Baker, believing that it felt more fitting for a full band than a solo recording. They started sharing demos and ideas for songs in a Google Drive folder and a group chat, convening in California twice in 2021 to write together in person. On November 19, the band performed together for the first time in three years as part of a charity concert for Bread and Roses Presents.

The band recorded the album at Shangri-La in Malibu, California, for much of January 2022 with contributions from several session musicians, including bass guitar work from Jay Som and percussion from Carla Azar of the American alternative rock band Autolux. Additional recording was completed at Sound City Studios in Van Nuys, California. The band self-produced the album, also enlisting Catherine Marks on the strength of her work producing albums for Manchester Orchestra. Across most of the album, Mike Mogis handled mixing duties, while Marks and Pat Sullivan helmed the engineering and mastering processes, respectively.

The band was secretive about the writing and recording processes while they were ongoing; when individual members were asked in interviews whether they would reunite, they generally gave oblique and evasive responses. Rumors about a debut album from Boygenius began to spread after a photoshoot in November 2022 and the announcement of their inclusion on the Coachella 2023 lineup. On January 18, 2023, the band's debut album The Record and its tracklist were announced, with a release date of March 31. Three singles were released at this time: "$20", "Emily I'm Sorry", and "True Blue". According to Bridgers, the album's first half consists of songs which were near completion by the time she, Dacus, and Baker shared them with each other, while the second half was informed by the bond shared between the group. The collaboratively written "Not Strong Enough" appears as the sixth track out of 12. On March 1, Interscope Records released the song as the album's fourth single, along with an accompanying music video. The label serviced it to adult album alternative radio stations in the United States on March 13, and to alternative radio stations in the country 15 days later.

== Writing and composition ==
=== Music ===
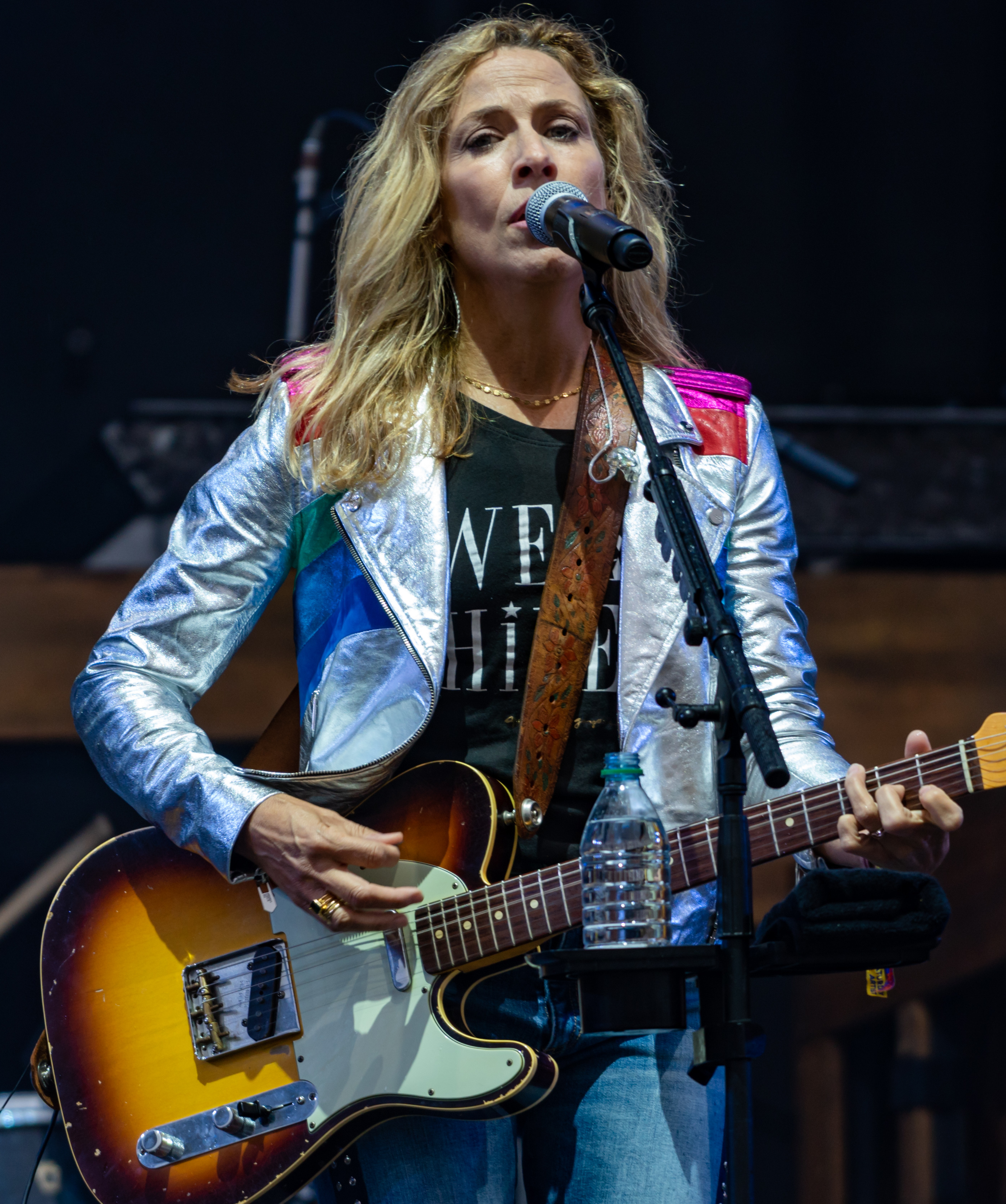
"Not Strong Enough" drew musical comparisons to, and lyrical inspiration from, Sheryl Crow (pictured in 2018).

"Not Strong Enough" primarily falls within the genres of indie rock (Note: Attributed to multiple sources:) and folk rock. (Note: Attributed to multiple sources:) Writing for Stereogum, Tom Breihan called it a "twinkling headrush rocker". For Exclaim! and Clash, the song evoked the Laurel Canyon music scene of the early 1970s. Eric Mason of Slant Magazine and Lindsay Zoladz of The New York Times detected influences from pop music in the recording; Mason believed that the song exhibited "sly pop acumen" and Zoladz felt that it subverted tropes of the genre. Cat Zhang of Pitchfork and Jeremy Winograd of Slant Magazine described it as country pop, and Ben Beaumont-Thomas of The Guardian categorized it as pop rock. Chris Willman of Variety classified it as jangle pop, with Andrew Sacher of BrooklynVegan also finding similarities to the genre. Jon Pareles of The New York Times perceived it to contain influences from new wave, which he attributed to the "pumping, echoing" production. Alex Flood of NME described the final minute of the song as "punky". During interviews with Variety and The New York Times, the band said that the song was partially written for radio play and that they wanted the song to be catchy and enjoyable; Dacus believed that the results were unconventional for what was ultimately a successful radio single, and Bridgers felt that the band's artistic integrity had remained intact. Willman, Carl Wilson of Slate, and Rachel Syme of The New Yorker perceived the song to have commercial appeal, while Syme and Sacher compared it to early singles by Sheryl Crow.

"Not Strong Enough" is built on basic rock instrumentation of guitars, bass, and percussion, while also incorporating synthesizers. The song integrates acoustic and electric guitars, both of which are strummed. (Note: Attributed to multiple sources:) Allaire Nuss of Entertainment Weekly and Mikael Wood of the Los Angeles Times assessed the guitar riffs as possessing luminescent qualities. They sounded like chimes to Mark Savage of BBC Music. Angie Martoccio of Rolling Stone compared the song's guitarwork to the American musician Frank Black, having previously reported in a January 2023 cover story that Bridgers had partially drawn influence from Black during the songwriting process. Pareles posited that the song's bass lines provide counter-melodies against the guitars. Several critics commented that the percussion was high in energy and integral to the song; Rolling Stone and British GQ characterized the drumming as "chaotic" and "pounding", respectively, and PopMatters's John Amen felt that the percussion had a "bouncy" aspect. The bass drum utilizes a four on the floor pattern. In an interview with Zan Rowe of the Australian radio station Double J, Marks recalled that, with mixing assistance from Sarah Tudzin, she used takes from two drummers – Azar and Barbara Gruska – to splice together the song's percussion. The synthesizers were compared to music of the 1980s by Kyle Petersen of No Depression and the American rock band the War on Drugs by John Vettese of WXPN. Nuss contrasted the "polished" synthesizers and "shimmering" guitars with what she described as great turmoil at the heart of the song, comparing the effect to porcelain being "hurtled at a wall".

The song was the final to be completed for The Record. According to sheet music published at Musicnotes.com by Hal Leonard Music Publishing, "Not Strong Enough" is set in common time, or 4/4, at a tempo of 126 beats per minute and composed in the key of D♭ major. It opens with a repeatedly strummed suspended G♭ chord before following a chord progression of D♭–A♭^{sus4}–E♭m7–B♭m in the verses. For the chorus, this switches to a progression of G♭^{sus2}–D♭–A♭–B♭m7, which frequently modulates after the A♭ chord. The vocals of Bridgers, Baker, and Dacus collectively span a range from the low note of F_{3} to the high note of D♭_{5}. All three members take lead vocal duties at varying points in the song: Bridgers leads the first verse and chorus; Baker leads the second verse and chorus; and Dacus leads the bridge and final chorus. Bridgers and Baker sing their respective verses alone, with the rest of the group adding vocal harmonies during each chorus. A short instrumental interlude follows the second chorus, after which Dacus quietly sings solo with minimal musical accompaniment. (Note: Attributed to multiple sources:) Bridgers and Baker gradually join Dacus as the music builds intensity. The song reaches its climax near the end of the bridge, carried by "thundering instrumentation" according to NPR Music, as Baker's and Bridgers's voices raise drastically. The instruments abruptly but briefly quiet underneath the vocals, leading into the final chorus.

=== Lyrics ===
The two wolves inside us can be self-hatred and self-aggrandizing ... Being like, "I'm not strong enough to show up for you. I can't be the partner that you want me to be." But also being like, "I'm too fucked up. I'm unknowable in some deep way!" Self-hatred is a god complex sometimes, where you think you're the most fucked-up person who's ever lived. Straight up, you're not. And it can make people behave really selfishly, and I love each of our interpretations of that concept.

— Phoebe Bridgers

The lyrics of "Not Strong Enough" discuss issues like mental illness and resultant relationship dysfunction. In a video interview with Genius, Bridgers elucidated that the song was about using self-pity to escape the responsibility that comes with accountability, while Baker described the lyrics as expressing self-consciousness of one's abilities to do their part in a relationship but lacking the commitment to do so. Dacus responded to Bridgers and Baker by humorously labeling the song as "fuckboy-genius". Alex Hopper of American Songwriter surmised that the song was about an unhealthy relationship in which self-loathing and insincere apologies are used as leverage. Other critics determined aspects of gender roles while Gay Times's Zoya Raza-Sheikh interpreted the lyrics to contain facets of feminism.

Bridgers's verse describes lacking the executive function capabilities to change clocks so that they display the correct time. Rick Quinn of PopMatters theorized this incapacitation to be the result of a panic attack. According to Rob Hakimian of Beats Per Minute, the verse's opening lines establish the overall mood of the song's lyrics, which Hakimian characterized as "dissociative". The philosopher Mihaela Frunzǎ described the depiction of a "black hole open[ing] in the kitchen" as emblematic of the protagonist's disorderly state of mind. Vulture and Flood Magazine summarized the verse as portraying the effects of depression on the perception of one's surroundings.

Baker's verse is about the prospect of a drag race ending in a lethal automobile accident. It namechecks the song "Boys Don't Cry" (1979) by the English rock band the Cure, which Dacus described as a reference to how people are expected by society to keep their emotions hidden. Quinn remarked that "Boys Don't Cry" shares its name with a 1999 film about Brandon Teena, a trans man who was slain in a hate crime; he suggested that Baker's verse contains a double entendre alluding to drag performers and anti-LGBT bigotry.

The song's chorus is an homage to Crow's 1994 single "Strong Enough". Bridgers had thought of the referential lyric, "Not strong enough to be your man", long before the song was written and had been waiting for the right opportunity to include it. Though the song details feelings of depression, Bridgers told Newsweek that she did not experience these emotions during the writing process, likening the discrepancy to "talking to your friends about the things you struggle with mentally, like you're not actually emotionally activated in the moment when sharing or talking about it." Each chorus uses different lyrics: Bridgers's chorus catastrophizes about things which have not yet occurred; Baker's chorus centers around internal duality and shirking responsibility by refusing to accept capacity; and Dacus's chorus mentions "having revelations" and cutting a car trip short to go home. (Note: Attributed to multiple sources:)

The bridge consists of the line, "Always an angel, never a god", repeated twelve times. According to Dacus, the lyric is intended to describe "receiving praise for being subservient". Hopper felt that it represented a "power imbalance" where a person with mental illness has greater influence in a relationship, while Lola J. DeAscentiis of The Harvard Crimson opined that it represented feeling helpless and adrift. Nuss stated that it conveyed feelings of disappointment with being belittled by other people. Writing for Flood Magazine, Kyle Lemmon interpreted the lyric to express "feelings of guilt and shame". To Atwood Magazine's Nic Nichols and Dazed's Günseli Yalcinkaya, the lyric encapsulated the struggles of women against misogyny in the music industry. Spin's Daniel Kohn wrote that it "express[ed] ... how to manage your own expectations and emotions while dealing with your own shit".

Frunzǎ connected the bridge with the religious backgrounds of Dacus and Baker, who both grew up in Christian homes in the Southern United States. The music theorist David S. Carter included it in a sample of 118 songs for a 2025 study of certain types of bridges, which he termed rebuilds. Carter defined a rebuild as a bridge in which a song loses volume, and then employs new material to prepare a buildup toward a final climax. He analyzed "Not Strong Enough" for its use of a repeated lyrical figure in a rebuild consisting of looped music which was not present in any previous sections of the song, but interacted with those sections and any that came after.

== Commercial performance ==
"Not Strong Enough" appeared on several rock-related single charts in the United States. It debuted at number 17 on Billboard's Adult Alternative Airplay chart on the week ending March 25; it reached number one on the week ending June 3, becoming the first song by any member of Boygenius to summit a Billboard airplay chart. It remained at number one for seven weeks and spent a total of 24 weeks on the chart; Billboard ultimately ranked it as the most successful song of 2023 on adult alternative radio. On Billboard's Alternative Airplay chart, the song debuted at number 40 on the week ending April 8, peaking at number 11 on the week ending September 2 and charting for a total of 23 weeks. On Billboard's overall Rock Airplay chart, which measures audience impressions across mainstream rock, alternative, and adult album alternative radio stations, the song debuted at number 39 on the week ending March 25 and peaked at number 12 on the week ending June 17, charting for a total of 24 weeks. Billboard later ranked the song at numbers 27 and 26 on the 2023 year-end tallies for Alternative Airplay and Rock Airplay, respectively. On the multi-metric Hot Rock & Alternative Songs chart, which ranks songs based on streaming figures and digital sales in addition to radio airplay, it debuted at number 43 on the week ending March 18 and peaked at number 26 on the week ending June 10, spending 22 weeks on the chart; it was ranked at number 74 on that chart's year-end listing.

On the Irish Singles Chart, the song debuted and peaked at number 78 on the week of April 6 and fell off the chart the following week. It re-entered at number 84 on the week of August 31 for a second and final week on the chart. On Billboard Japan's Hot Overseas chart, the song debuted at number 15 on the week of March 20 and has since charted for nine non-consecutive weeks. It peaked at number nine on the week of May 1; as of May 2024, its most recent appearance was on the week of February 19, when it was ranked at number 15.

== Critical reception ==
"Not Strong Enough" received widespread acclaim from music critics. Multiple publications deemed the song a highlight of The Record in their reviews of the album, including Alternative Press, NME, DIY, PopMatters, Beats Per Minute, Exclaim!, Flood Magazine, Paste, and Uncut. DeAscentiis exalted the song as "a stunning masterpiece that manages to turn the most gruesome mental breakdown into a work of art, yet still avoids the romanticization of these struggles." Atwood Magazine's collaborative review of The Record saw five of the review's seven contributors cite "Not Strong Enough" as one of the album's best songs, complimenting its "colorful instrumentation" and "spunky admission of inadequacy". Writing for Consequence, which selected it as its Song of the Week, Spencer Dukoff described it as a "worship song for non-believers" and praised the vocals and lyrics. Hakimian called it the band's best song and found it heartening in defiance of its pessimistic lyrics. Hopper appreciated the song's unconventional approach to relationship-based lyrical themes.

Many critics lauded as synergistic the chemistry between the three musicians. Among them were Amen, Stephen Troussé of Uncut, and Ben Tipple of DIY; Amen extended his plaudits to the vocal production, while Tipple also considered the lyrics poignant. Adam Feibel of Exclaim! opined that the song was uniquely an alloy of each member's abilities while also highlighting them individually. MusicOMH and Nashville Scene both considered the song to be "greater than the sum" of the trio's individual songwriting and performance capabilities. Erica Campbell for NME and Caitlin Wolper for Alternative Press agreed with Amen in praising the vocal production – particularly how the vocals were layered – while also praising the vocals themselves. Willman regarded the song as "anthemic" while Martoccio called it one of Boygenius's best songs; both commended the trio's chemistry. Lemmon hailed the song as a "full-band tour de force" and wrote that the trio's delivery lent an air of hope to otherwise distraught lyrics.

Reviewers and journalists broadly championed the "Always an angel, never a god" bridge. It was called "epic" by Dukoff; a "battle cry" by British GQ; and cathartic by Spectrum Culture's Rachel Alm, who further wrote that the bridge could heal and revitalize listeners. She additionally extolled Dacus's vocals immediately after the bridge as "transcendent". Stephen Thompson for NPR Music called it an "iconic" lyric worth repeating. Savage praised it as a feminist message which deserved to be played in stadiums; Beaumont-Thomas agreed that it merited chanting by a large audience. Raza-Sheikh said that the bridge's enthusiasm was contagious and that it was bolstered by the instrumental choices running underneath the vocals.

No Ripcord's David Coleman was less positive; in a mixed review of The Record, he considered "Not Strong Enough" to be emblematic of his reservations toward the album. He was unimpressed with the songwriting and arrangements, and criticized the album as falling short of its promise, although he did praise the harmonies.

=== Accolades ===
Spin, Uproxx, and the Los Angeles Times crowned "Not Strong Enough" as the best song of 2023. Many other publications and media organizations included it in their year-end lists, such as BBC Music (number two), Billboard (number six), British GQ (unranked), Clash (number 15), Consequence (number 22), DIY (number three), Elle (unranked top 42), Entertainment Weekly (number two), Esquire (unranked top 20), The Guardian (number 19), NME (number 15), NPR Music (unranked top 123), Paper (unranked top 17), Pitchfork (number 32), Rolling Stone (number 13), Slant Magazine (number 10), Spectrum Culture (number four), Time Out (number 20), and Variety (unranked top 65). Triple J ranked it at number 30 on their Hottest 100 of 2023. Exclaim! placed it eighth on a 2023 list of the best songs written and performed by Bridgers, while Zoladz highlighted it as one of nine key tracks by the band and its members. In September 2024, Pitchfork listed it at number 72 on a mid-decade ranking of the best songs of the 2020s. In October 2025, Rolling Stone Australia ranked it at number 80 on a list of the best songs of the 21st century to date.

At the 66th Annual Grammy Awards (2024), "Not Strong Enough" received nominations in three categories: Record of the Year, Best Rock Song, and Best Rock Performance. It lost the first award to "Flowers" by Miley Cyrus, but won the latter two awards; they were, together with The Record's win for Best Alternative Music Album, the first Grammys for all band members. (Note: Bridgers additionally won Best Pop Duo/Group Performance as a featured artist on "Ghost in the Machine" by SZA.) Several media outlets remarked that Boygenius was amongst a large number of LGBT artists who had received nominations and awards, including Cyrus, Brandy Clark, Billie Eilish, Victoria Monét, Romy, and Troye Sivan. In an interview with Billboard, the trio stated that they were pleased by the amount of LGBT representation at the 2024 Grammys, which they described as indicative that the LGBT community was being taken more seriously as an artistic force than it had been previously. In the same interview, and later upon accepting the awards, the band detailed feelings of excitement and disbelief. Dacus expressed that she "need[ed] a whole new bucket list" and that "[she, Baker, and Bridgers] were all delusional enough as kids to think that this might happen to [them] someday"; Bridgers pontificated about "what weird shit [she could] do next" and Baker emphasized the importance of music in her life.

== Music video ==
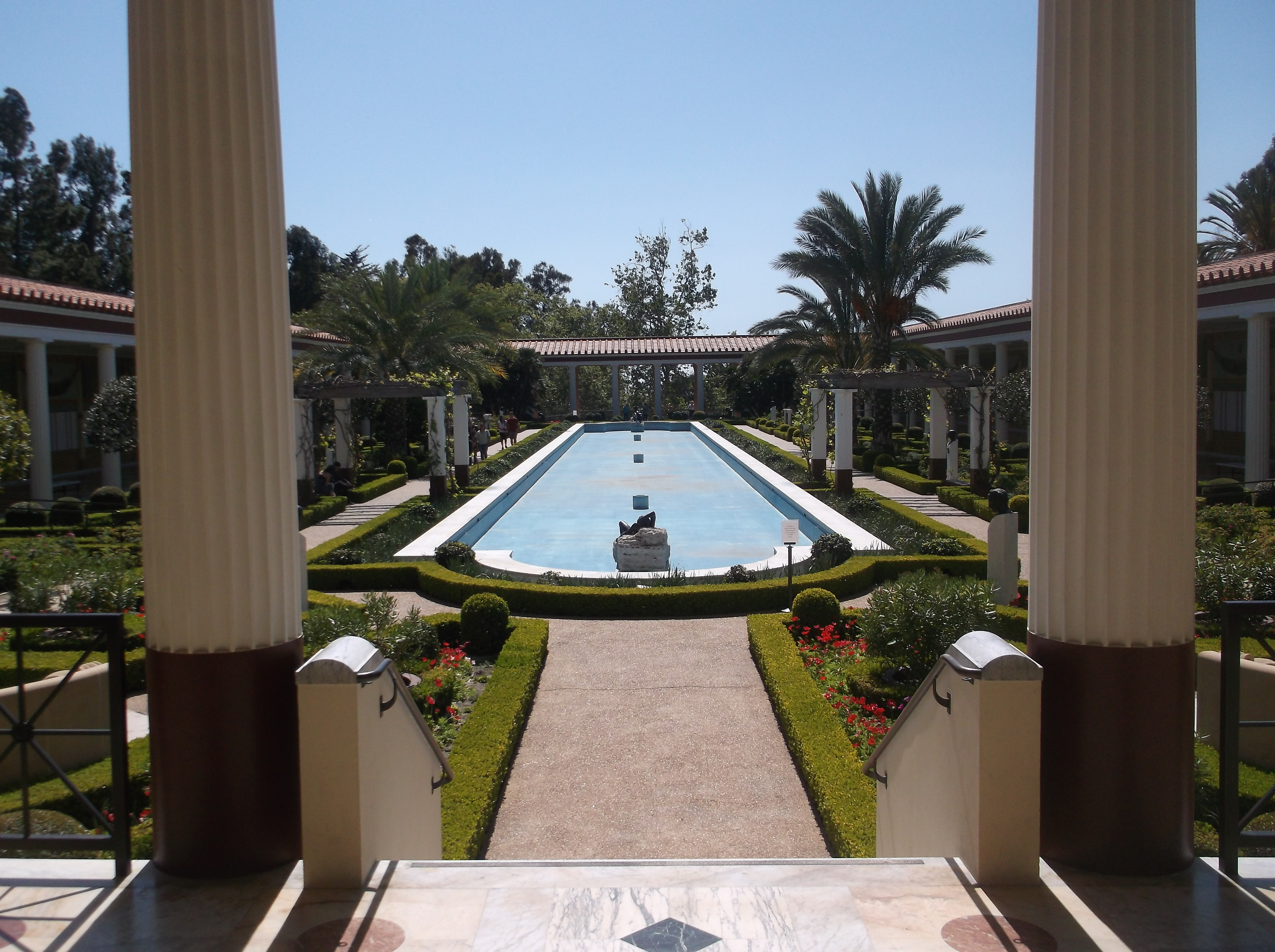
A fountain in the Outer Peristyle of the Getty Villa in Pacific Palisades, as seen from the main building in April 2012; at approximately 1:10 in the music video, a clip of this area from a similar angle is shown as the band walks toward the gardens

The music video for "Not Strong Enough" documents Baker, Bridgers, and Dacus spending a day together in various locations around Los Angeles. It starts with images of roadside scenery, interspersed with a clip of members headbanging while driving, before they arrive at the Santa Monica Pier. At the pier, they prance along the boardwalk, play arcade games, and ride a carousel, a Ferris wheel, and a roller coaster. After this, they go to the Getty Villa, where they explore the area and observe multiple statues and art displays. In one sequence, the screen continually moves to the right as Baker, Bridgers, and Dacus stand straight in between several busts, attempting to mimic their stoic facial expressions. Next, they practice softball in a batting cage before visiting a miniature golf course, where Baker and Bridgers climb a small castle used as a prop. They then go for a hike, where they descend a long staircase and traverse a dark tunnel. During the second half of the song's bridge, the video progresses through clips at a dramatically increased rate; these clips include a monster truck rally, Bridgers viewing tarot cards, Dacus in a bookstore, rehearsal in the studio, and the band preparing and eating meals. The video finishes with them having a beachside bonfire, where in one scene, they are running around while waving brightly colored smoke bombs through the air.

Baker, Bridgers, and Dacus expressed to i-D magazine that their intention had been to create a video that represented their friendship; they recorded the video themselves so that the result would be more authentic. Bridgers's brother Jackson edited it. DeAscentiis, Robin Murray of Clash, and Will Schube of uDiscover Music opined that the presentation of the video resembled that of a home movie. DeAscentiis felt that the carefree aura of the video contradicted the dark themes of the lyrics, adding more depth to the song. Cron wrote: "It's as fun as it is endearing, and it underlines why Boygenius' members work so well together. From the joy on their faces, it's clear that the music – vital as it is – is not the most important part of Boygenius." Derrick Rossignol of Uproxx commented that the video made apparent the strength of the band's bond, further stating that it "echo[ed] the album's mission statement, which was described in previous press materials as being 'about recapturing joy.'" Newsweek's David Chiu remarked that the unassuming nature of the video contrasted Boygenius against past supergroups, whom he said to have been afflicted with "commercial pressures and ego".

== Live performances ==
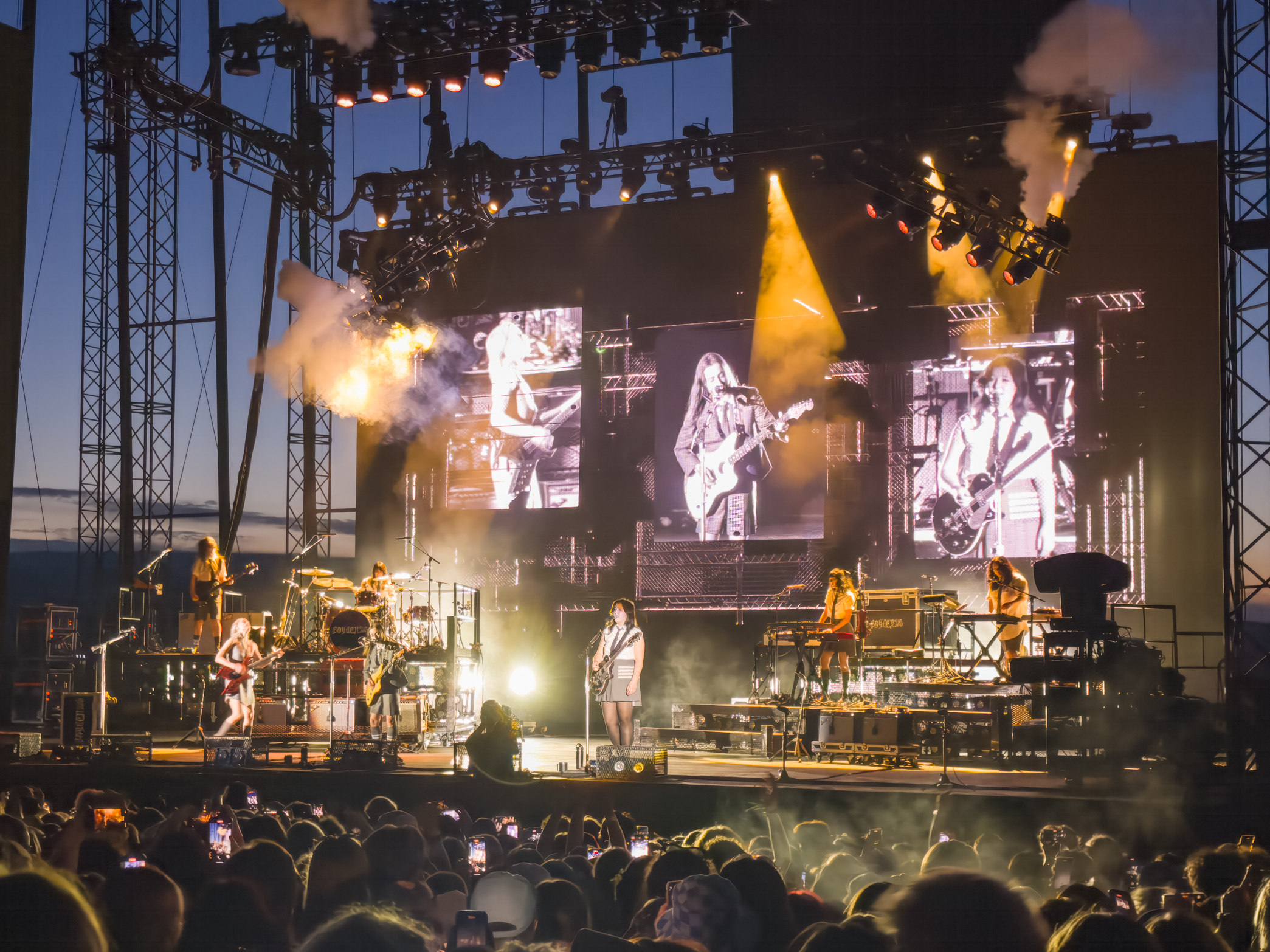
Boygenius performing in George, Washington, in July 2023

Boygenius first performed "Not Strong Enough" at Carnegie Hall in New York City as part of a benefit concert for the nonprofit Tibet House US on March 1, 2023, coinciding with the release of the single. The band's inclusion was arranged shortly before the concert; the only other song in their setlist was fellow The Record track "Cool About It", which was also performed live for the first time. It became a regular part of their setlist during the Tour in support of The Record, usually near or at the end of the main set. In a review of an August 20 performance at Gunnersbury Park in West London, England, Kitty Empire of The Guardian described the song as a "theme tune" for the band. Billboard's Stephen Daw praised an October 2 rendition at Madison Square Garden in New York City – the trio's first concert at that venue – as "top-notch". Reviewing a June 13 concert at Harrah's Cherokee Center in Asheville, North Carolina, Brian Postelle of Asheville Stages described a visceral crowd reaction to the song, writing: "If [the audience] had all been suddenly lifted into the air and spirited away, it would not have seemed so out of place."

Concurrently with the first several weeks of the Tour, Bridgers opened for Taylor Swift at 10 dates on the Eras Tour; at the first of these, a May 5 show at Nissan Stadium in Nashville, Baker and Dacus joined Bridgers onstage to perform "Not Strong Enough". When the Tour concluded with a concert on Halloween at the Hollywood Bowl, the band dressed as the Trinity – Dacus as the Father, Baker as the Son, and Bridgers as the Holy Spirit – to perform the song in a move which Variety compared to the "always an angel, never a God" lyric. The band also played the song on the late-night talk show, Jimmy Kimmel Live! (April 21), and on the sketch comedy series, Saturday Night Live (November 11). For the latter performance, the band paid homage to the Beatles' first appearance on The Ed Sullivan Show, including by donning black suits and borrowing the font of the Beatles' logo for their kick drum. In 2026, Bridgers included it in her setlist for the Lost Tour. Baker and Dacus again joined her onstage for the song; a September 24 rendition at Barclays Center in New York City constituted their first performance as a trio since February 2024.

== Credits ==
Credits are adapted from a Rolling Stone article, a Double J interview of Catherine Marks, and the liner notes of The Record.

Boygenius

- Julien Baker – performance, songwriting, production
- Phoebe Bridgers – performance, songwriting, production
- Lucy Dacus – performance, songwriting, production

Additional personnel

- Carla Azar – percussion
- Melina Duterte – bass guitar
- Barbara Gruska – percussion
- Catherine Marks – production, engineering
- Mike Mogis – mixing
- Pat Sullivan – mastering
- Sarah Tudzin – mixing

== Charts ==
=== Weekly charts ===
Weekly chart performance for "Not Strong Enough"
| Chart (2023) | Peak position |
|---|---|
| Ireland (IRMA) | 78 |
| Japan Hot Overseas (Billboard) | 9 |
| US Hot Rock & Alternative Songs (Billboard) | 26 |
| US Rock & Alternative Airplay (Billboard) | 12 |

=== Year-end charts ===
Year-end chart performance for "Not Strong Enough"
| Chart (2023) | Position |
|---|---|
| US Hot Rock & Alternative Songs (Billboard) | 74 |
| US Rock Airplay (Billboard) | 26 |

== Certifications ==
Certifications for "Not Strong Enough"
| Region | Certification | Certified units/sales |
|---|---|---|
| New Zealand (RMNZ) | Gold | 15,000^{‡} |
| United Kingdom (BPI) | Silver | 200,000^{‡} |
^{‡} Sales+streaming figures based on certification alone.
