= The Rest (EP) =

EP by Boygenius
- Released: October 13, 2023
- Recorded: May 2023
- Studios: Blackbird (Berry Hill, Tennessee); Sound City (Van Nuys, California)
- Genre: Indie folk
- Length: 12:04
- Label: Interscope
- Producers: Tony Berg; boygenius; Jake Finch; Ethan Gruska; Calvin Lauber; Collin Pastore; Marshall Vore

Boygenius chronology
The Record (2023)	The Rest (2023)

Julien Baker chronology
The Record (2023)	The Rest (2023)	Send a Prayer My Way (2025)

Phoebe Bridgers chronology
The Record (2023)	The Rest (2023)	Lost Weekend (2026)

Lucy Dacus chronology
The Record (2023)	The Rest (2023)	Forever Is a Feeling (2025)

That photo was taken during the same shoot for the original album art. We always liked the image, but when we chose these four songs to put out together, they all have this spacey, eerie quality about them. I think the wind being in our hair, the natural elements messing us up, it’s a little more unsettling and I feel like these songs—I don’t think they lack optimism, but they’re a little more focused on fear and unsteadiness.

— Lucy Dacus on the packaging and feel of The Rest

The Rest is the second extended play by American indie rock supergroup Boygenius, released through Interscope Records on October 13, 2023. A follow-up to the band's first full-length album The Record, individual songs were revealed one at a time while on tour, eventually performing the entire EP. The EP has received positive reviews from critics.

== Reception ==
According to the review aggregator Metacritic, The Rest received "generally favorable reviews" based on a weighted average score of 75 out of 100 from six critic scores. Editors at AllMusic rated this album 3.5 out of 5 stars, with critic Stephen Thomas Erlewine writing that "the EP feels a bit hushed when compared to the LP, a quietness that helps shift the focus to the individual singer/songwriters rather than the collective" and called this "a welcome coda to the relative exuberance of The Record". This album was shortlisted as notable for the week at BrooklynVegan, where Andrew Sacher opined that "this material is just as strong as the songs on the full-length". Alex Hudson of Exclaim! chose this as a Staff Pick stating that "as we near the end of 2023, it reasserts boygenius as one of the year's defining bands, and even more than the sum of their formidable parts". El Hunt of Evening Standard gave this EP 4 out of 5 stars, writing that "The Rest feels less cohesive than The Record, and rather than a love letter to accidentally stumbling on creative alchemy, Dacus, Baker and Bridgers all get their own moments in the spotlight" and called it "the perfect debut companion piece".

Alana Rae praised the storytelling in this album in her review for The New Zealand Herald, writing that "the four songs follow complex, often melancholic, relationships with others or, in some cases, themselves". Thomas Smith of NME gave The Rest 4 out of 5 stars, stating that "there’s material... that could have fought hard for space on their debut album". Olivia Horn, writing for Pitchfork, scored this album a 7.5 out of 10, stating that it is "aglow with the sense of triumph that has haloed the group’s recent history". In Spill Magazine, this was an editor's pick and critic Joseph Mastel rated it 4.5 out of 5, concluding "it might not reach the perfection of the record, but the rest is still a magnificent group of songs". Marc Abbott of Under the Radar rated this EP 6 out of 10, writing that while "there are moments of brilliance" here, but that it "comes across as sounding like that’s exactly what they deserve and need: a rest".

Editors at Spin chose this as the 21st best EP of 2023.

== Track listing ==
All songs written by Julien Baker, Phoebe Bridgers, and Lucy Dacus, except where noted.

1. "Black Hole" – 2:21
2. "Afraid of Heights" – 2:41
3. "Voyager" (Baker, Bridgers, Dacus, Christian Lee Hutson, Conor Oberst, and Marshall Vore) – 2:48
4. "Powers" – 4:14

== Personnel ==
Boygenius

- Julien Baker – instrumentation, vocals, lead vocals on first verse of "Black Hole" and all of "Powers", production
- Phoebe Bridgers – instrumentation, vocals, co-lead vocals on second verse of "Black Hole", lead vocals on all of "Voyager", production
- Lucy Dacus – instrumentation, vocals, co-lead vocals on second verse of "Black Hole", lead vocals on all of "Afraid of Heights", production

Additional personnel

- Ariel Baldwin – design
- Tony Berg – production
- Jake Finch – keyboards, strings, sound design, production
- Matt Grubb – cover photography
- Ethan Gruska – keyboards, sound design, vocal engineering, production
- Christian Lee Hutson – guitar
- Calvin Lauber – bass guitar, sound design, vocal engineering, production
- Will Maclellan – engineering
- Mike Mogis – mixing
- Collin Pastore – pedal steel guitar, sound design, engineering, production
- Lowell Reynolds – engineering
- Pat Sullivan – mastering
- Marshall Vore – drums, production
- Nathaniel Walcott – horn

== Charts ==
Chart performance for The Rest
Chart (2023)	Peak position
German Albums (Offizielle Top 100)	67
US Billboard 200	50
US Top Alternative Albums (Billboard)	6
US Americana/Folk Albums (Billboard)	4
US Top Rock Albums (Billboard)	8

== See also ==
- 2023 in American music
- List of 2023 albums
