= Little Oblivions =

Studio album by Julien Baker
- Released: February 26, 2021
- Recorded: December 2019–January 2020
- Studio: Young Avenue Sound / Trace Horse Studio
- Genres: Rock; indie rock; alternative rock
- Length: 42:39
- Label: Matador
- Producer: Julien Baker

Julien Baker chronology
Boygenius (2018)	Little Oblivions (2021)	The Record (2023)

Singles from Little Oblivions
- 1. "Faith Healer" Released: October 21, 2020; 2. "Hardline" Released: January 13, 2021; 3. "Favor" Released: February 3, 2021; 4. "Heatwave" Released: February 24, 2021

Little Oblivions is the third studio album by American singer-songwriter Julien Baker, released on February 26, 2021. Alongside the album's announcement, Baker released "Faith Healer" as the first single from the album. Little Oblivions is a departure from the acoustic alt folk of her first two albums. It features a full band sound, played almost entirely by Baker herself, with genres encompassing indie rock, alternative rock, emo, soft rock, electronic music, pop punk, post-rock, country, shoegaze, and slowcore. The album received acclaim from critics.

== Background ==
On April 8, 2020, Baker performed the song "Mercy," titled "Song in E" on the album, in a livestream on Instagram Live. This was the first widely publicized performance of "Song in E," which Baker had played at shows in August 2018 and again in mid-2019, along with an early version of "Ringside," another track that would appear on Little Oblivions.

The first single off of Little Oblivions, "Faith Healer," was released on October 21, 2020. In lieu of a traditional bio, the album announcement came with an essay written by Hanif Abdurraqib:

Little Oblivions is an album that […] doesn’t offer repair, or forgiveness. Sometimes, though, a chance to revel in the life that is never guaranteed. Yes, the life that grows and grows and is never promised. How lucky to still be living, even in our own mess.

The grand project of Julien Baker, as I have always projected it onto myself, is the central question of what someone does with the many calamities of a life they didn’t ask for, but want to make the most out of. I have long been done with the idea of hope in such a brutal and unforgiving world, but I’d like to think that this music drags me closer to the old idea I once clung to. But these are songs of survival, and songs of reimagining a better self, and what is that if not hope? Hope that on the other side of our wreckage — self-fashioned or otherwise — there might be a door. And through the opening of that door, a tree spilling its shade over something we love. A bench and upon it, a jacket that once belonged to someone we’d buried. Birds who ask us to be an audience to their singing. A small and generous corner of the earth that has not yet burned down or disappeared. I can be convinced of this kind of hope, even as I fight against it. To hear someone wrestling with and still thankful for the circumstances of a life that might reveal some brilliance if any of us just stick around long enough.

== Critical reception ==
Professional ratings
Aggregate scores
Source	Rating
AnyDecentMusic?	8.0/10
Metacritic	84/100
Review scores
Source	Rating
AllMusic	3.5/5 stars
The A.V. Club	A
Clash	9/10
DIY	4.5/5 stars
Exclaim!	9/10
The Line of Best Fit	7/10
NME	4/5 stars
Paste	9.2/10
Pitchfork	7.6/10
Rolling Stone	4/5 stars

Little Oblivions was met with widespread critical acclaim. At Metacritic, which assigns a normalized rating out of 100 to reviews from professional publications, the release received an average score of 84, based on 22 reviews, indicating "universal acclaim". Aggregator AnyDecentMusic? gave the album an 8.0 out of 10, based on their assessment of the critical consensus.

Adam Feibel of Exclaim! said "After two critically lauded albums of raw, powerful alt-folk — as well as a rapturously received collaboration with Phoebe Bridgers and Lucy Dacus as boygenius — Memphis-based singer-songwriter Julien Baker has burst forth with a third effort that's so fully formed and viscerally human, it might as well have its own pulse." Tatiana Tenreyro of The A.V. Club said "In many ways, Little Oblivions is a re-introduction to Baker’s music. Both of her previous records focused on a soft, minimalist sound that highlighted Baker’s powerful voice and words. It’s the kind of music that is best listened to alone." DIY writer Ben Tipple said that the album sees Baker "accompanied by an expanse of instrumentation previously absent from her sound, and drums drive Little Oblivions forward with a disarming urgency. At times, the hushed subtlety of the two previous records is all-but forgotten, not least as ‘Ringside’ leans on heavy reverb and ‘Repeat’ turns to electronic pulses and distorted vocals. It’s new territory for Julien, but one she traverses with ease, complementing her more overt tales of faith, inebriation and inter-personal relationships" Despite this, as Marcy Donelson of AllMusic puts it, "Despite the bigger sound on average, however, Baker's brutal lyrical authenticity remains the main attraction." Callum Foulds of The Line of Best Fit highly praised the album, saying "Rarely does an artist so eagerly present themselves in relentlessly un-pretty circumstances, that it makes listening equally as uncomfortable and as it is captivating. Julien Baker has delivered music so full of emotional clarity that it seems a miracle that she survived its creation." John Amen of Slant gave the album 4 out of 5 stars, writing: "Little Oblivions represents a significant step for one of contemporary music’s most eloquent artists."

=== Accolades ===
Little Oblivions on year-end lists
Publication	Accolade	Rank	Ref.
Consequence of Sound	Top 50 Albums of 2021	15	
Exclaim!	50 Best Albums of 2021	13	
God Is in the TV	Albums of 2021	13	
The Line of Best Fit	The Best Albums of 2021	13	
The New York Times	Jon Pareles' Best Albums of 2021	6	
The New Yorker	The Best Music of 2021	3	
Slate	The 10 Best Albums of the Year	—N/a	
Sputnikmusic	Top 50 Albums of 2021	9	
Under the Radar	Top 100 Albums of 2021	14	
Uproxx	The Best Albums Of 2021	—N/a	

== Track listing ==
All tracks are written by Julien Baker.

Little Oblivions track listing
No.	Title	Length
1.	"Hardline"	3:51
2.	"Heatwave"	2:44
3.	"Faith Healer"	2:54
4.	"Relative Fiction"	4:19
5.	"Crying Wolf"	3:29
6.	"Bloodshot"	3:47
7.	"Ringside"	4:00
8.	"Favor"	4:38
9.	"Song in E"	2:44
10.	"Repeat"	2:55
11.	"Highlight Reel"	3:36
12.	"Ziptie"	3:42
Total length:		42:39

Japanese edition bonus track
No.	Title	Length
13.	"Guthrie"	4:54

== Personnel ==
Credited adapted from the album's liner notes.

- Julien Baker – performance, production, illustrations
- Craig Silvey – mixing
- Dani Bennett Spragg – mixing assistance
- Greg Calbi – mastering
- Calvin Lauber – engineering, additional instrumentation
- Collin Pastore – additional engineering
- James Glaves – additional engineering
- Nick Carpenter – additional engineering
- Phoebe Bridgers – backing vocals on "Favor"
- Lucy Dacus – backing vocals on "Favor"
- Matt de Jong – creative direction
- Jamie-James Medina – creative direction
- Wylee Risso – painting

== Charts ==
Chart performance for Little Oblivions
Chart (2021)	Peak position
Australian Albums (ARIA)	21
Belgian Albums (Ultratop Flanders)	71
German Albums (Offizielle Top 100)	37
Irish Albums (IRMA)	74
Swiss Albums (Schweizer Hitparade)	68
UK Albums (Official Charts)	51
US Billboard 200	39
US Americana/Folk Albums (Billboard)	1
US Independent Albums (Billboard)	6
US Top Alternative Albums (Billboard)	5
US Top Rock Albums (Billboard)	4
