= Turn Out the Lights (album) =

Studio album by Julien Baker
- Released: October 27, 2017
- Studios: Ardent Studios, Memphis, Tennessee
- Genres: Alternative rock; indie folk; slowcore; indie rock
- Length: 42:01
- Label: Matador
- Producer: Julien Baker

Julien Baker chronology
Sprained Ankle (2015)	Turn Out the Lights (2017)	Boygenius (2018)

Singles from Turn Out the Lights
- 1. "Appointments" Released: August 17, 2017; 2. "Turn Out the Lights" Released: October 11, 2017

Turn Out the Lights is the second studio album by American singer-songwriter Julien Baker. It was released on October 27, 2017, by Matador Records. The album received critical acclaim and was placed on several lists of the best albums of 2017 and the 2010s as a whole.

== Background ==
Julien Baker began writing Turn Out the Lights while on tour for her debut album Sprained Ankle. The overall recording period for the album was said to be six days, each lasting twelve hours. As with Sprained Ankle, Baker self-produced Turn Out the Lights. Following the success of her debut, Baker gained positive attention and would begin working with Matador Records who helped release Turn Out the Lights. The album was recorded in the Memphis-based recording studio Ardent Studios.

The album features violinist Camille Faulkner, who Baker met as a student at Middle Tennessee State University. Others who collaborated on the album consist of several confidants from Baker's youth. The release of the album coincided with a concert in Manhattan at Town Hall.

== Lyrics ==
Turn Out the Lights covers a broad range of themes from Julien Baker's personal experiences with faith to her sexuality and identity. Similarly to Sprained Ankle, Baker once again touches on mental health and substance abuse. Despite the tone of her music, the album also contains a message of hope.

== Critical reception ==
Professional ratings
Aggregate scores
Source	Rating
AnyDecentMusic?	8.0/10
Metacritic	83/100
Review scores
Source	Rating
AllMusic	3.5/5 stars
Alternative Press	4.5/5 stars
American Songwriter	4.5/5 stars
The A.V. Club	A
Chicago Tribune	3/4 stars
The Guardian	3/5 stars
Mojo	3/5 stars
Pitchfork	8.6/10
Record Collector	4/5 stars
Uncut	8/10

Turn Out the Lights holds a score of 83 out of 100 on the review aggregator website Metacritic based on 24 reviews, indicating "universal acclaim" from critics. In a review for The A.V. Club, Kyle Ryan wrote that "As Baker digs into mental health, relationships, faith, and adulthood, Turn Out The Lights is, understandably, absolutely crushing... it is beautifully crafted throughout, full of the kinds of songs that linger long after they've ended." Kika Chatterjee of Alternative Press rated the album 4.5/5 stars, stating that the album "proves [Baker]'s had enough pain to last several lifetimes. There's an elegance to her music that wasn't there before—a sudden bright piano riff over deep guitar; a harrowing, shouted acapella—that feels like a coming of age."

Selecting Turn Out the Lights as one of the best albums of the year, The New York Times critic Jon Caramanica wrote, "Few if any songwriters are as evocative as Julien Baker, and few if any singers are capable of capturing despair and resilience quite like she can. Her second album is full of harrowing folk hymns about spiritual woe sung with the determination of someone who’s triumphing nonetheless." August Brown from Los Angeles Times praised the album in a year-end review, stating, "“Visionary” is an easy word to toss around, but on her second LP, the still unbelievably young Baker saw a kinder, more empathetic world grounded in faith and humility and vulnerability. Gorgeously self-produced too."

=== Year-end lists ===
Select year-end rankings of Turn Out the Lights
Critic/Publication	List	Rank	Ref.
All Things Loud	Album of the year: The Top 10	1	
Alternative Press	The 40 Best Albums of 2017	—N/a	
The A.V. Club	The 20 Best Albums of 2017	8	
BrooklynVegan	Top 50 Albums of 2017	6	
Consequence of Sound	Top 50 Albums of 2017	13	
Exclaim!	Top 20 Pop & Rock Albums	6	
Los Angeles Times	August Brown's Top 10 Albums of 2017	3	
New York Daily News	Top 100 Albums of 2017	5	
The New York Times	Jon Caramanica's Best Albums of 2017	9	
The New York Times	Jon Pareles's Best Albums of 2017	4	
Pitchfork	The 50 Best Albums of 2017	18	
Pitchfork	The 20 Best Rock Albums of 2017	4	
Stereogum	The 50 Best Albums of 2017	13	
Under the Radar	Top 100 Albums of 2017	2	
Time Out New York	The Best Albums of 2017	12	
Variety	The Best Albums of 2017	—N/a	

=== Decade-end lists ===
Publication	List	Rank	Ref.
All Things Loud	Top 100 Albums of the Decade	32	
Albumism	The 110 Best Albums of the 2010s	—N/a	
BrooklynVegan	100 Best Punk & Emo Albums of the 2010s	74	
Paste	The 100 Best Albums of the 2010s	90	

== Track listing ==
All tracks are written by Julien Baker.

No.	Title	Length
1.	"Over"	1:28
2.	"Appointments"	4:33
3.	"Turn Out the Lights"	3:23
4.	"Shadowboxing"	3:53
5.	"Sour Breath"	3:04
6.	"Televangelist"	4:53
7.	"Everything to Help You Sleep"	4:21
8.	"Happy to Be Here"	4:16
9.	"Hurt Less"	3:59
10.	"Even"	3:33
11.	"Claws in Your Back"	4:38
Total length:		42:01

== Personnel ==
- Julien Baker – vocals (2–11), guitars (2–5, 8, 10), piano (1, 2, 4, 6, 7, 9, 11), organ (6, 7)
- Camille Faulkner – strings (1, 2, 7, 9, 11)
- Cameron Boucher – clarinet and saxophone (1, 2)
- Matthew Gilliam – additional vocals (9)
- Calvin Lauber – recording engineer, pre-mix
- Craig Silvey - final mix engineer

== Charts ==
Chart (2017)	Peak position
US Billboard 200	78
US Top Alternative Albums (Billboard)	9
US Americana/Folk Albums (Billboard)	3
US Independent Albums (Billboard)	9
US Top Rock Albums (Billboard)	12
