= This World or the Next =

Studio album by Julien Baker
- Released: February 12, 2027
- Studio: Lucy's Meat Market
- Label: Matador
- Producer: Julien Baker

Julien Baker chronology
Send a Prayer My Way (2025)	This World or the Next (2027)

This World or the Next is the upcoming fourth studio album from American singer-songwriter Julien Baker. The album is set to be released on February 12, 2027, via Matador Records. The album is self-produced and was made with Baker's longtime friends Matthew Gilliam and Calvin Lauber. In addition to the album announcement, Baker released the song "Hound."
