= Julien Baker =

American rock musician (born 1995)

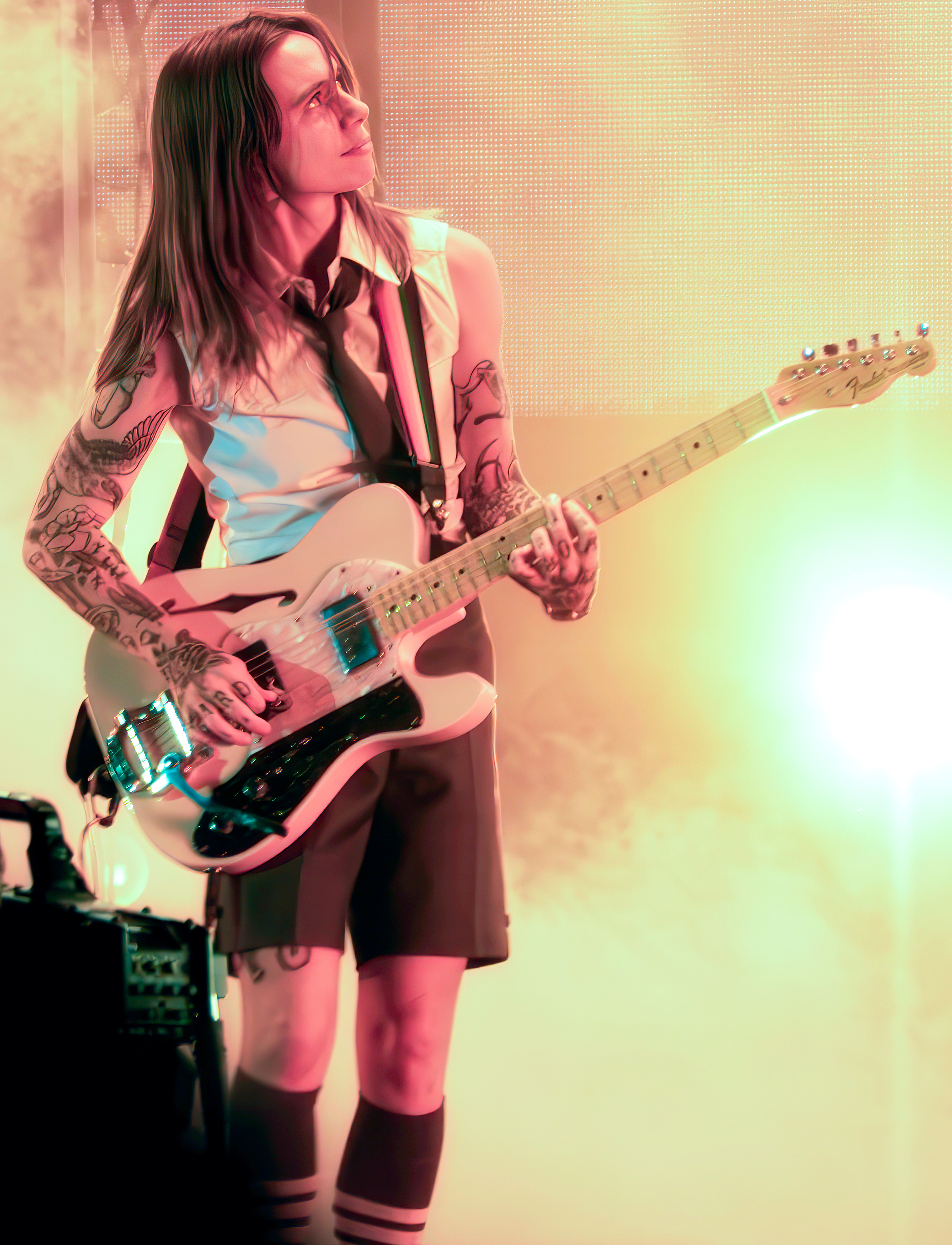
- Baker performing in 2023

Background information
- Born: Julien Rose Baker; September 29, 1995 (age 31); Germantown, Tennessee, U.S.
- Genres: Alternative rock; indie folk; slowcore; indie rock; emo; post-rock
- Occupations: Musician; singer-songwriter
- Instruments: Vocals; guitar; keyboards; mandolin; bass; banjo; drums
- Years active: 2010–present
- Labels: Matador; 6131 Records (former)
- Member of: Boygenius: Julien Baker & Torres
- Website: julienbaker.com

Julien Rose Baker (born September 29, 1995) is an American indie rock singer-songwriter and guitarist. Their (Note: Baker has been referred to using both she/her and they/them pronouns. This article uses they/them for consistency.) music is noted for its moody quality and confessional lyrical style, as well as frank explorations of topics including Christianity, addiction, mental illness, and human nature. They have received six Grammy Award nominations and three wins as a member of Boygenius.

Born and raised in suburban Memphis, Tennessee, Baker released their debut album Sprained Ankle (2015) while they were a student at Middle Tennessee State University. The album received critical acclaim and appeared on several 2015 year-end lists. Baker subsequently signed to Matador Records and released their second studio album Turn Out the Lights in 2017, to further critical success. their third album, Little Oblivions (2021), embraced a more full-band sound and became Baker's first top 40 album on the Billboard 200 chart.

In addition to their solo work, Baker is a member of the indie supergroup Boygenius, alongside Phoebe Bridgers and Lucy Dacus. The group's debut eponymous EP was released in October 2018. Boygenius announced their reunion in January 2023, and their debut studio album The Record was released in March. The group's newest release, titled The Rest, was released in October 2023. Baker is also in a country duo with Torres, debuting together in 2024. In November 2026, Baker announced the upcoming release of their fourth studio album, This World or the Next.

== Early life ==
Julien Rose Baker was born on September 29, 1995, in Germantown, and raised in Bartlett, Tennessee, near Memphis. Their parents both worked in the field of physical therapy. They have spoken of being inspired by their father who, after an accident in his twenties resulting in the amputation of his leg, dedicated his life to making experimental prosthetic limbs. Baker's parents separated while they were in elementary school.

Baker grew up in a devout Baptist family, and their early exposure to music involved playing at their church. After seeing Green Day on television, they were inspired to explore more alternative music and started listening to bands like My Chemical Romance and Death Cab for Cutie. They subsequently became captivated by the punk, hardcore, metalcore, and screamo scenes, and has said some of their favorite bands were mewithoutYou, Underoath, The Chariot, Norma Jean, and Whitechapel. They struggled with substance abuse as a young teen, but found support in the community surrounding house shows in Memphis, and became inspired by the straight edge punk subculture. While in high school in 2010, Baker co-founded the band the Star Killers, who renamed themselves Forrister in 2015.

Baker attended Arlington High School and then Middle Tennessee State University, where they had a campus job in the A/V department and initially studied audio engineering, before switching to literature and secondary education. They eventually left school to tour full-time after the release of Sprained Ankle, but returned to campus in the fall of 2019 to complete their degree in literature.

== Career ==
=== 2015–2017: Sprained Ankle and Turn Out the Lights ===
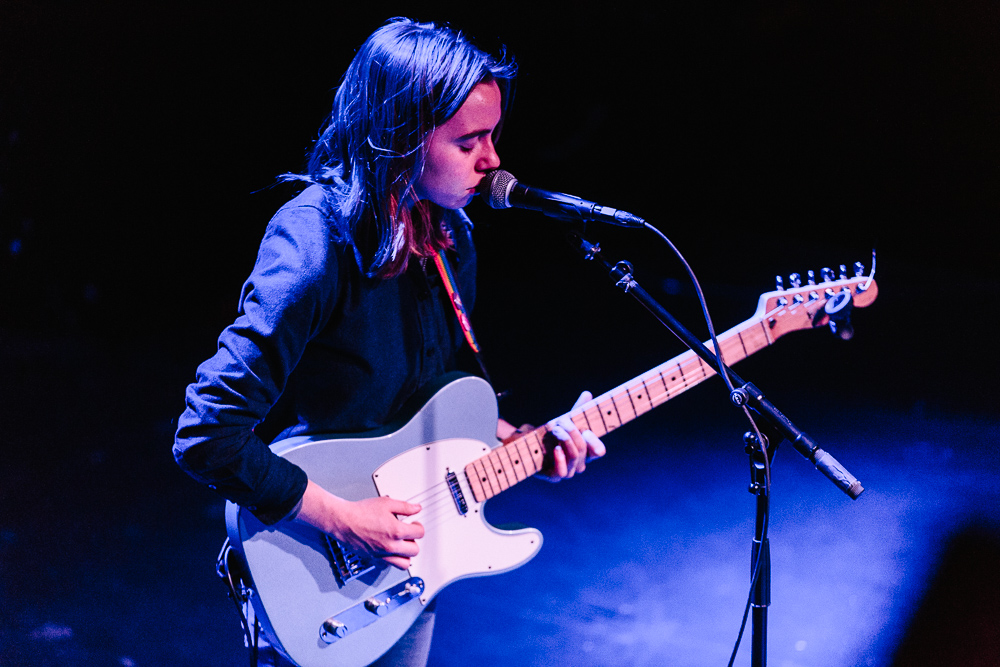
Baker performing at Rough Trade NYC in 2016

Baker's first musical project was a post-rock ensemble they participated in during high school. During their first year at MTSU, Baker began writing songs on their own, often utilizing the university practice rooms that stayed open late at night. They wrote what would become Sprained Ankle in their dorm room and recorded it on free studio time that a friend of theirs had gotten from an internship. They have said that they never thought the EP would be heard by a wide audience; they put it on Bandcamp so that their friends could hear it.

Baker's music was picked up by 6131 Records, who released the album Sprained Ankle in October 2015. Sprained Ankle ended up topping many 2015 year-end lists, and its success led to features in The New Yorker and The New York Times, with various critics calling it "heartbreaking," "hypnotic," and "striking." In March 2016, Baker gave an NPR Tiny Desk performance, the first of an eventual four appearances at the desk. They also played at that year's South by Southwest and Newport Folk festivals. Their performances from this period have been called "hushed, reverential events," with the audience often remaining quiet and emotional.

In October 2016, they contributed to Say Yes! A Tribute to Elliott Smith, covering "Ballad of Big Nothing".

In 2017, Baker signed to Matador Records, and released a 7-inch single consisting of the songs "Funeral Pyre" (previously called "Sad Song 11") and "Distant Solar Systems."

Their second album, Turn Out the Lights, was recorded with engineer and producer Calvin Lauber at Ardent Studios in Memphis, and released on October 27, 2017, to further acclaim. They spent the following year touring across the U.S. and internationally, performing alongside artists including The National, Father John Misty, Half Waif, Adam Torres, and Lucy Dacus, and appearing on CBS This Morning and The Late Show with Stephen Colbert.

Baker has opened for or collaborated with a wide range of artists, including Death Cab for Cutie, Conor Oberst, Paramore and Hayley Williams, The National, The Decemberists, Belle & Sebastian, Frightened Rabbit, The Front Bottoms, Touche Amore, Manchester Orchestra, and Bright Eyes. During Eaux Claires in July 2018, they performed with poet Hanif Abdurraqib, mixing "Claws in Your Back" from Turn Out the Lights with a poem cycle from Abdurraqib's "How Can Black People Write About Flowers at a Time Like This" poems.

=== 2018–2023: Boygenius and Little Oblivions ===
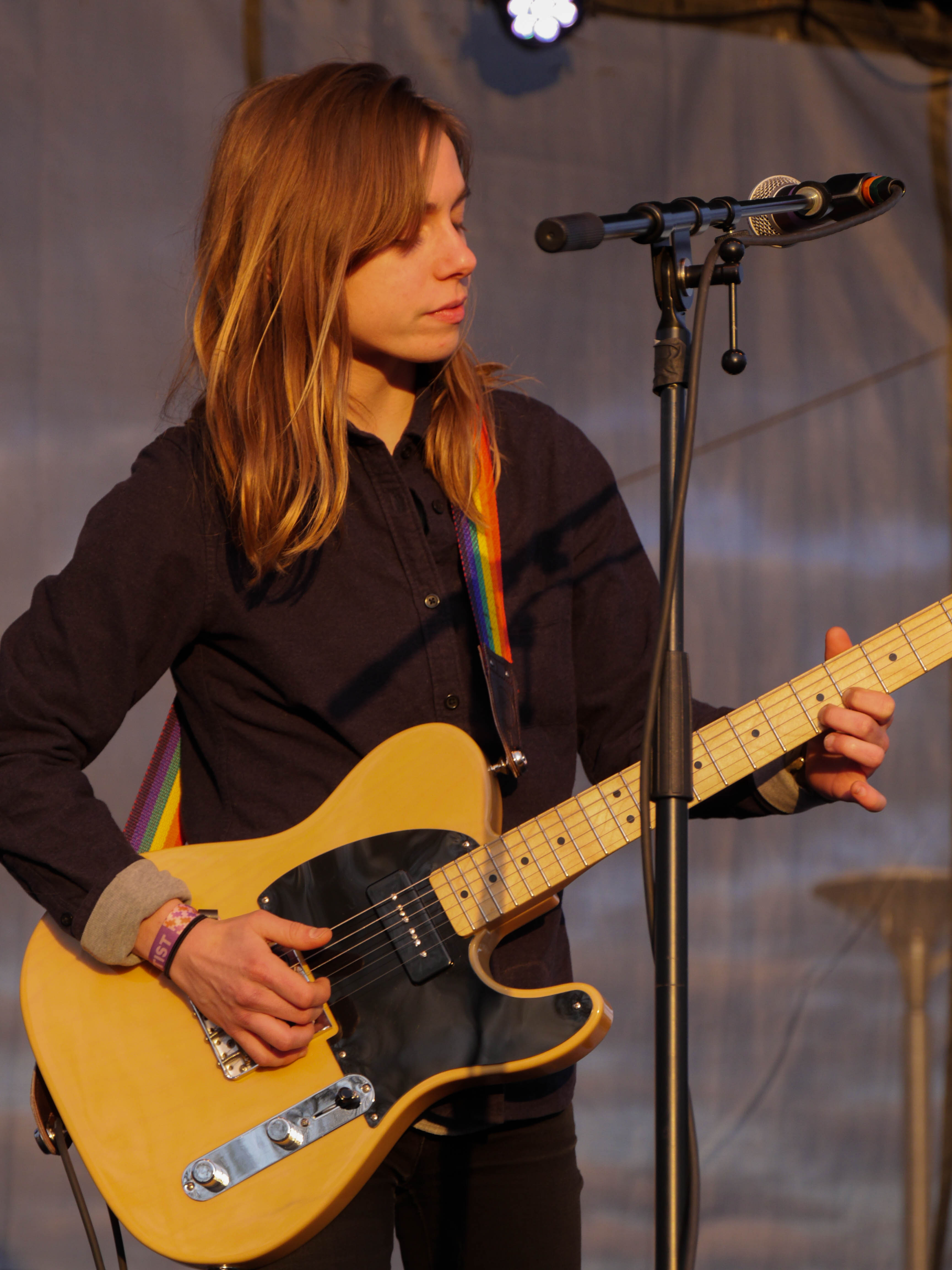
Baker in 2018

In 2018, Baker formed the rock supergroup Boygenius with fellow indie singer-songwriters Phoebe Bridgers and Lucy Dacus, both of whom they had toured with previously. The group released three songs in August of that year and subsequently announced an eponymous EP, Boygenius, which was released on October 26, 2018, to widespread critical acclaim. The band spent that November touring the U.S., and performed "Me & My Dog" on Late Night with Seth Meyers. The trio has continued to collaborate on each other's solo work since the release of their EP, lending backing vocals to two songs from Bridgers' Grammy-nominated Punisher (2020), "Please Stay" from Dacus' Home Video (2021), and "Favor" from Baker's Little Oblivions (2021), as well as Hayley Williams' Petals for Armor (2020) single "Roses/Lotus/Violet/Iris."

In 2019, Baker put out two 7-inch singles. The first, released in June, featured songs "Red Door" and "Conversation Piece," and the second in October featured "Tokyo" and "Sucker Punch" as part of the Sub Pop singles series. All four songs had a slightly more produced sound than their previous work and were received very positively. They also contributed to Tiny Changes: A Celebration of Frightened Rabbit's 'The Midnight Organ Fight', covering "The Modern Leper".

On October 21, 2020, Baker announced their third studio album, Little Oblivions, accompanied by the lead single "Faith Healer" and an essay by poet Hanif Abdurraqib. Little Oblivions was released February 26, 2021, and was preceded by additional singles "Hardline" and "Favor." It was written mostly over the course of 2019, a difficult and formative year for Baker as they had to cancel various tour dates, struggled with their sobriety and mental health, and eventually returned to school to finish their degree at MTSU. In January, they appeared on The Late Show with Stephen Colbert, performing "Faith Healer."

In 2022, Baker released a B-Side EP to Little Oblivions and shared the single "Guthrie".

=== 2023–2024: The Record ===
In March 2023, Boygenius released their debut studio album, The Record, to universal acclaim. The band played Coachella 2023 in April. They then embarked on the Re:SET Concert Series and joined member Phoebe Bridgers for some opening sets on Taylor Swift's The Eras Tour. In June 2023, the band performed in drag in Baker's home state of Tennessee in protest of anti-drag legislation that state governor Bill Lee signed into law that was blocked in federal court. After a North America leg, they toured Europe, before returning to the US for the second half of the tour.

In October 2023, the band released a second EP, The Rest. During the second leg of their The Record tour, they debuted these songs night by night. Baker features most prominently on the last song of the collection, "Powers." The band's album, The Record received six nominations at the 66th Annual Grammy Awards including Album of the Year and Record of the Year, ultimately winning three, including Best Alternative Music Album. As of February 1, 2024, Boygenius is on hiatus, describing the situation as 'going away for the foreseeable future'.

In October 2023, Baker released the track "Thick Skull" (Re: Julien Baker) on Re: This Is Why, a remixed version of Paramore's This Is Why. Baker composed the opening theme to the television series Orphan Black: Echoes, which first premiered in November 2023.

In 2024, Baker performed at the Kennedy Center with the National Symphony Orchestra as part of the Declassified series. They embarked on a fall tour later that year, including headlining the inaugural New York edition of the All Things Go Music Festival. On tour they debuted the new songs "Middle Children" and "High in the Basement". They also collaborated with several artists in 2024, appearing on tracks by The Naked and Famous member Thomas Powers, Touché Amoré, and Medium Build.

=== 2024–2026: Send a Prayer My Way ===
After dueting a couple of songs together at Baker's 2024 New York shows, they and musician Torres were announced as a joint act on the lineup of several festivals for 2025, including Big Ears in Knoxville, Tennessee and High Water Music Festival in Charleston, South Carolina, with the phrase "Put A Little Sugar In The Tank" on their new website. The duo debuted their new song "Sugar in the Tank" on The Tonight Show Starring Jimmy Fallon on December 10. On January 29, 2025, the duo released their second single, "Sylvia", and announced their debut album, Send a Prayer My Way, set to be released on April 18, 2025. They embarked on a tour of the Southern United States in April, however the tour was canceled shortly after beginning due to health reasons.

=== 2026–present: This World or the Next ===
On September 9, 2026, Baker announced via Instagram that they would be performing a show at The Blue Room in Nashville, Tennessee that evening. This was revealed on September 11 to be a part of a wider US tour, consisting of 18 shows across 6 states from October–November 2026. A portion of proceeds from the tour were donated to LGBTQ+ nonprofit The Ally Coalition. Baker performed a number of unreleased songs at these shows: one song, "Lathe", was sold in limited quantities on vinyl, and three other songs' titles were obscured from the shows' setlists.

On November 17, 2026, Baker released the single "Hound", with a video directed by Joshua Cannon, and announced that their fourth studio album, This World or the Next, would be released on February 12, 2027. The album is Baker's first to be recorded with Calvin Lauber and Matthew Gilliam (Baker's former Forrister bandmate)– an experience Baker described as "like discovering people who spoke your own personal language".

== Artistry ==
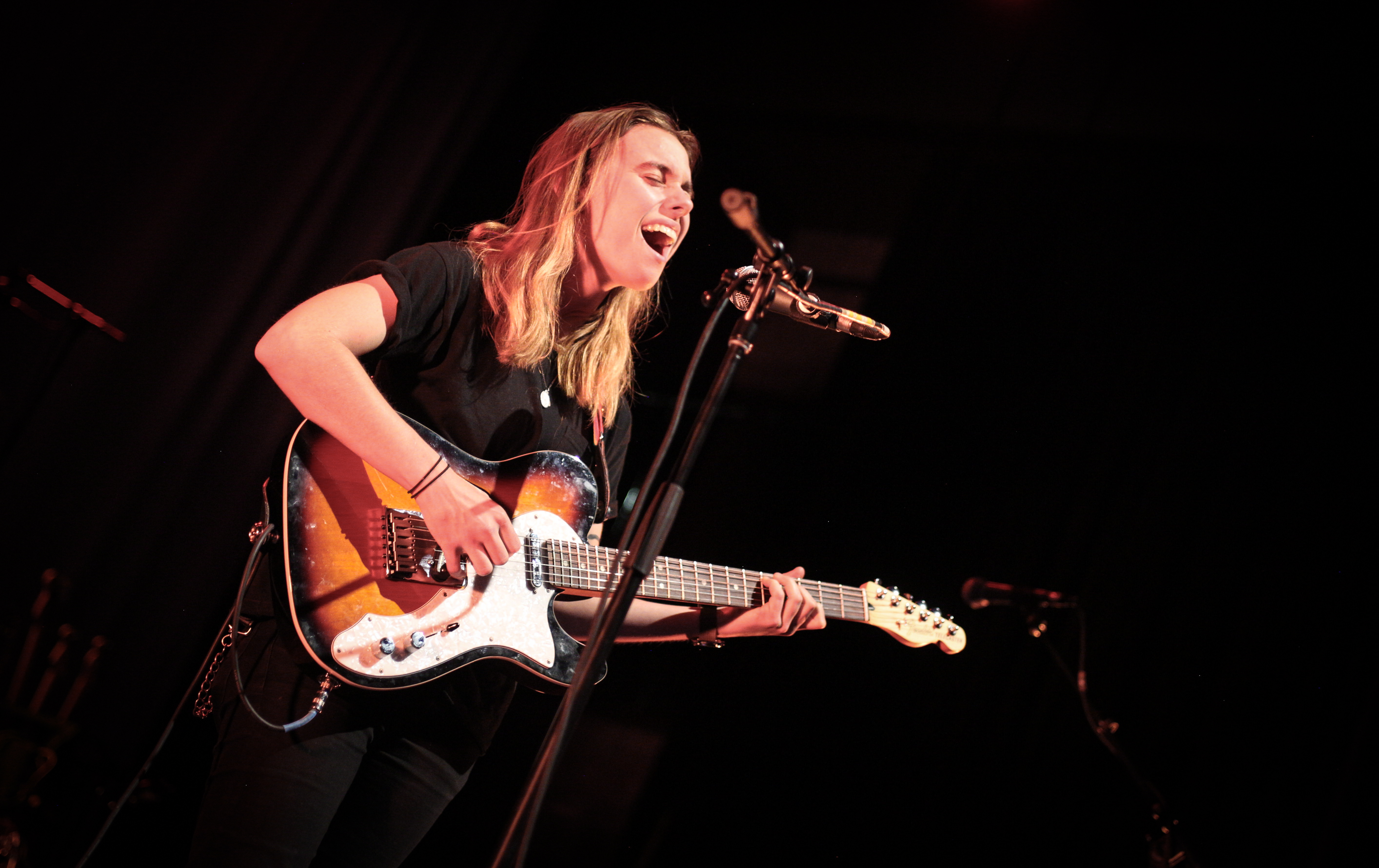
Baker performing at the Palace Theatre in Saint Paul, Minnesota, in 2017

Baker is known for their personal, confessional songwriting, and their music has been categorized as a mix of indie rock, indie folk, alternative, and emo. The sparse arrangements on their "fragile, gentle" 2015 debut, Sprained Ankle, feature only their voice, guitar, and occasional piano, and their stage performances for many years consisted of their alone, utilizing a loop pedal. Paste assessed, "Baker's skill lies in their narrative songwriting, which pierces their experiences to the bone." 2017's Turn Out the Lights saw the addition of occasional violin, as well as organs and "cavernous-sounding production." their performances from this period have been called "hushed, reverential events," with the audience often remaining quiet and emotional.

They sing in the soprano vocal range.

Baker experimented with a more full-band sound for their 2021 release Little Oblivions, and has commented on feeling limited by expectations to adhere to their established style. The album newly featured drums, bass, keyboards, mandolin, and banjo, all played by Baker on the recording. On tour following its release, they played with a full band and debuted new, multi-instrument arrangements of their previous work, describing the band's sound as "post-rock."

Baker's guitar playing style is known to employ effects such as reverb and overdrive. They use techniques such as arpeggiation.

"Baker's gentle touch [...] evok[es] an entire world — of suffering and healing, eagerness and fear, loneliness and companionship, distance and intimacy — in its search for a more human truth."

— Marissa Lorusso, "The 200 Greatest Songs By 21st Century Women", NPR

Baker's writing is infused with religious themes, and it often is noted for its occasionally violent imagery. Hope, redemption, love, addiction, shame, self-loathing, and direct appeals to God are all prominent motifs throughout their work. Their music often features frank explorations of addiction and sobriety, and they have been open in discussing their experiences with substance abuse and mental illness.

Poet Hanif Abdurraqib delineated Baker's body of work as follows:

The grand project of Julien Baker, as I have always projected it onto myself, is the central question of what someone does with the many calamities of a life they didn't ask for, but want to make the most out of. I have long been done with the idea of hope in such a brutal and unforgiving world, but I'd like to think that this music drags me closer to the old idea I once clung to. But these are songs of survival, and songs of reimagining a better self, and what is that if not hope? Hope that on the other side of our wreckage — self-fashioned or otherwise — there might be a door. And through the opening of that door, a tree spilling its shade over something we love. A bench and upon it, a jacket that once belonged to someone we'd buried. Birds who ask us to be an audience to their singing. A small and generous corner of the earth that has not yet burned down or disappeared. I can be convinced of this kind of hope, even as I fight against it. To hear someone wrestling with and still thankful for the circumstances of a life that might reveal some brilliance if any of us just stick around long enough.

== Personal life ==
Baker is a lesbian, and their fraught experiences with organized Christianity inform much of their work. They came out to their parents at age 17, after years of being closeted and watching friends get sent to conversion therapy or kicked out of their homes. However, they found their family was "radically accepting". They previously referred to themself as a Christian socialist, but has spoken on how being constantly labeled the "sober queer Christian" early in their career was damaging to their understanding of their identity, and led to their questioning and reevaluating many foundational aspects of their life. They have since discussed the ever-changing nature of their relationship to faith, saying they are no longer interested in labeling their beliefs so rigidly and that they are trying to adopt a less dichotomous worldview than the one they were raised with, calling the realization "freeing." Baker has been diagnosed with obsessive–compulsive disorder and depression.

In February 2024, Baker was named an Honorary Professor of Recording Industry at their alma mater, Middle Tennessee State University. Baker resided in Nashville, Tennessee until 2023, when they relocated to Los Angeles, California. They are currently in a relationship with fellow musician and Boygenius bandmate Lucy Dacus.

In September 2026, Baker and Dacus attended a protest ahead of a speech by Israeli prime minister Benjamin Netanyahu at the United Nations General Assembly in New York City.

== Discography ==
Julien Baker discography
- Studio albums: 3
- EPs: 5
- Singles: 16

=== Studio albums ===
Title	Album details	Peak chart positions									
Title	Album details	US	US Alt	US Folk	US Indie	US Rock	AUS	BEL (FL)	GER	IRE	UK
Sprained Ankle	Released: October 23, 2015; Label: 6131; Format: LP, CD, digital download, streaming	— (Note: Sprained Ankle did not enter the US Billboard 200 but did peak at number 23 on the Heatseekers Albums chart.)	―	―	―	―	―	―	―	―	―
Turn Out the Lights	Released: October 27, 2017; Label: Matador; Format: LP, CD, cassette, digital download, streaming	78	9	3	9	12	―	―	―	―	―
Little Oblivions	Released: February 26, 2021; Label: Matador; Format: LP, CD, digital download, streaming	39	5	1	6	4	21	71	37	74	51
This World or the Next	To be released: February 12, 2027; Label: Matador; Format: LP, CD, digital download, streaming	–	–	–	–	–	–	–	–	–	–

=== Extended plays ===
Title	EP details
Sprained Ankle	Released: 2014; Label: Self-released; Format: Digital download, CD
Spotify Sessions	Released: May 20, 2016; Label: 6131; Format: Digital download, streaming
Audiotree Live	Released: October 22, 2016; Label: Audiotree Music; Format: Digital download, streaming
Little Oblivions: The Remixes	Released: September 1, 2021; Label: Matador Records; Format: Digital download, streaming.
B-Sides	Released: July 21, 2022; Label: Matador Records; Format: Digital download, streaming.

=== Singles ===
Title	Year	Peak chart positions		Album
Title	Year	US AAA	US Sales	Album
"Funeral Pyre"	2017	—	11	Non-album singles
"Distant Solar Systems"	2017	—	—	Non-album singles
"Appointments"	2017	—	—	Turn Out the Lights
"Turn Out the Lights"	2017	—	—	Turn Out the Lights
"Bad Things to Such Good People" (with Manchester Orchestra)	2018	—	—	Non-album singles
"Red Door"	2019	—	—	Non-album singles
"Conversation Piece"	2019	—	—	Non-album singles
"The Modern Leper"	2019	—	—	Tiny Changes: A Celebration of Frightened; Rabbit's 'The Midnight Organ Fight'
"Tokyo"	2019	—	—	Non-album singles
"Sucker Punch"	2019	—	—	Non-album singles
"Faith Healer"	2020	14	—	Little Oblivions
"A Dreamer's Holiday" (Spotify Singles)	2020	—	—	Non-album single
"Hardline"	2021	—	—	Little Oblivions
"Favor"	2021	—	—	Little Oblivions
"Heatwave"	2021	27	—	Little Oblivions
"Guthrie"	2022	—	—	B-Sides
"Sugar in the Tank" (with TORRES)	2025	10	—	Send a Prayer My Way
"Hound"	2026	–	—	This World or the Next
"—" denotes single that did not chart or was not released in that territory.

=== Guest appearances ===
Title	Year	Primary artist(s)	Album
"Ballad of Big Nothing" (Elliott Smith cover)	2016	—N/a	Say Yes! A Tribute to Elliott Smith
"Skyscraper"	2016	Touché Amoré	Stage Four
"How It Gets In"	2017	Frightened Rabbit	Recorded Songs
"Bad Things To Such Good People" (Pedro the Lion cover)	2018	Manchester Orchestra	—N/a
"All I Want"	2018	Matt Berninger, Stephen Altman	7-Inches for Planned Parenthood, Vol. 2: Pt. 1
"The Modern Leper" (Frightened Rabbit cover)	2019	—N/a	Tiny Changes: A Celebration of Frightened Rabbit's The Midnight Organ Fight
"Everybody Lost Somebody" (Bleachers cover)	2019	—N/a	Terrible Thrills, Vol. 3
"Bless This Hell"	2019	Mary Lambert	Grief Creature
"Roses/Lotus/Violet/Iris"	2020	Hayley Williams	Petals For Armor
"First Time"	2020	Becca Mancari	The Greatest Part
"Graceland Too"	2020	Phoebe Bridgers	Punisher
"I Know the End"	2020	Phoebe Bridgers	Punisher
"Reminders"	2020	Touché Amoré	Lament
"Act Four"	2021	Fucked Up	Year of the Horse
"Neil Young On High"	2021	The Ophelias	Neil Young On High
"Going Going Gone"	2021	Lucy Dacus	Home Video
"Please Stay"	2021	Lucy Dacus	Home Video
"Triple Dog Dare"	2021	Lucy Dacus	Home Video
"Underwater Boi"	2021	Turnstile	Glow On
"Marionette"	2021	Keaton Henson	Fragments
"Kid Fears" (Indigo Girls cover)	2021	Jason Isbell and the 400 Unit	Georgia Blue
"Hold My Hand"	2022	Wild Pink	ILYSM
"Over and Over"	2023	Becca Mancari	Left Hand
"Sport of Form"	2023	The Armed	Perfect Saviours
"In Heaven"	2023	The Armed	Perfect Saviours
"Thick Skull" (Re: Julien Baker)	2023	—N/a	Re: This Is Why
"Empty Voices"	2024	Thomas Powers	A Tyrant Crying In Private
"Goodbye for Now"	2024	Touché Amoré	Spiral In A Straight Line
"Yoke"	2024	Medium Build	Marietta
"Get Me Away from Here, I'm Dying" (Belle and Sebastian cover)	2024	Calvin Lauber, Soak, Quinn Christopherson	Transa
"The Invisible Hurt"	2026	The Saddest Landscape	Alone With Heaven

=== As part of Julien Baker & Torres ===
- Send a Prayer My Way (2025)

=== As part of Boygenius ===
- Boygenius (2018)
- Boygenius Demos (2020)
- The Record (2023)
- The Rest (2023)

=== As part of Forrister ===
- American Blues (2013) (as The Star Killers)
- "Esau" and "Black Poppy Wine" for Little Moses/The Star Killers Split (2014) (as The Star Killers)
- "Choked Up" (2015)

== Awards and nominations ==
Year	Association	Category	Nominated work	Result	Ref
2016	Libera Award	Libera Award for Best Breakthrough Artist	Sprained Ankle	Nominated	
2021	AIM Awards	Best Independent Video	"Hardline"	Nominated	
2024	Grammy Awards (Note: Nominated as a member of boygenius.)	Album of the Year	the record	Nominated	
2024	Grammy Awards	Best Alternative Music Album	the record	Won	
2024	Grammy Awards	Record of the Year	"Not Strong Enough"	Nominated	
2024	Grammy Awards	Best Rock Song	"Not Strong Enough"	Won	
2024	Grammy Awards	Best Rock Performance	"Not Strong Enough"	Won	
2024	Grammy Awards	Best Alternative Music Performance	"Cool About It"	Nominated	
2024	Brit Awards	International Group	boygenius	Won	
