= Sprained Ankle (album) =

Studio album by Julien Baker
- Released: October 23, 2015
- Recorded: Spacebomb Studios, Richmond, Virginia
- Genre: Indie folk
- Length: 33:33
- Label: 6131 Records

Julien Baker chronology
Sprained Ankle (2015)	Turn Out the Lights (2017)

Sprained Ankle is the debut studio album by American singer-songwriter Julien Baker. Originally self-released on Bandcamp as an EP, the album was re-released in October 2015 on 6131 Records. The album received critical acclaim and was placed on several lists of the best albums of 2015 and the 2010s as a whole.

In 2020, Paste listed it as one of the best indie folk albums of all time. It is considered an influential work, with one retrospective review stating "In the half-decade since its initial release, Baker's name has become synonymous with the revitalization of ultra-personal singer-songwriters wearing their hearts on their sleeves."

== Background and recording ==
The songs on Sprained Ankle were written by Baker while a student at Middle Tennessee State University. She thought her songwriting at the time did not "fit the vibe" of Forrister, her previous band, and did not intend to release them as an album. Her friend, Michael Hegner, had free time at MTSU's studio and offered to record her songs. They made a demo, Hegner liked it, and they kept working together. In the summer of 2014, they decided to take a road trip to Spacebomb Studios in Richmond, Virginia, where Hegner was interning, to record it. In an interview with The Blue Indian, Baker said that "it was recorded really sparsely and efficiently to get the most out of the time there, which contributed to the way the songs come across." The songs "Vessels" and "Brittle Boned" were later recorded by her friend, Toby Landers and added to the album.

== Music and lyrics ==
Sprained Ankle is a folk and indie folk album with elements of emo, lo-fi, and country. It is "made of sparse guitar (and piano) tunes about breakups, substance abuse, loneliness, physical and emotional pain, and enduring". The album was written mostly in a soundproof booth in Middle Tennessee State University, where Baker was a student at the time. It was recorded "one-mic and one-take", with an intimacy that "feels like a violation of [Baker's] privacy". "Go Home" features suicidal imagery and incorporates the hymn "In Christ Alone" and "bits of 'church radio' that accidentally fed into her preamp during recording".

Roman Gokhman of Paste assessed, "These songs were more personal than her earlier efforts, and rather than take a poetic look at her misgivings, Baker is brutally honest about the ugliness she faced. Her lyrical battles are not only with herself, but also with God, like Jacob wrestling the angel." The album has been described as "a bolt of lightning from out of nowhere, zapped down from heaven directly into a bottle bobbing in a vast and lonely ocean."

== Release and promotion ==
The record was first released as an EP on Bandcamp in the winter of 2014. Its first cover art was designed by Baker and a friend. People started sharing the record, then Baker toured it and sold CDs. 6131 Records liked her work and decided to sign her. The record was taken down from Bandcamp on advice from Baker's label so that it could be mastered and formally released.

The mastered versions of the songs "Sprained Ankle", "Something", and "Brittle Boned" premiered in advance on NPR's All Songs Considered, Stereogum, and Nylon respectively. Sprained Ankle was re-released in October 2015 through 6131 Records. The Sabyn Mayfield-directed music video for "Sprained Ankle" was released on October 26. The album charted on Billboard's Heatseekers Albums at number 25 for the week of November 14.

== Critical reception ==
Professional ratings
Review scores
Source	Rating
AllMusic	4/5 stars
Arizona Daily Sun	A+
Clash	9/10
Consequence of Sound	B
Drowned in Sound	8/10
Exclaim!	9/10
Pitchfork	7.0/10

Sprained Ankle received positive reviews. Gabriela Tully Claymore from Stereogum wrote that the songs were "unabashedly explicit, and Sprained Ankle discusses depression, substance abuse, and general crises of faith in detail." On the guitar playing, Ian Cohen of Pitchfork wrote that "[Baker is] a minimalist, playing bassy clusters of melodic thirds, flicking silvery harmonics, [and] palm-muting chords." He gave the album a score of 7 of 10. It was recorded in a way that Adam Kevil from Consequence of Sound considers to be a simple format, "[Baker] alone, singing and playing acoustic guitar directly into the microphone, sometimes in a single take".

In 2018, NPR selected its title track as the #156 greatest songs by a woman artist in the 21st century, stating, "Baker's gentle touch [...] evok[es] an entire world — of suffering and healing, eagerness and fear, loneliness and companionship, distance and intimacy — in its search for a more human truth."

=== Year-end lists ===
Publication	Accolade	Rank	Ref.
AbsolutePunk	Top Albums of 2015	6	
The A.V. Club	The 15 Best albums of 2015	13	
BrooklynVegan	Top 50 Albums of 2015	—N/a	
The New York Times	Jon Caramanica’s Best Albums of 2015	8	
Paste	The 50 Best Albums of 2015	49	
Stereogum	The 50 Best Albums of 2015	40	

=== Decade-end and all-time lists ===
Publication	List	Rank	Ref.
BrooklynVegan	Best Albums of the 2010s	76	
BrooklynVegan	100 Best Punk & Emo Albums of the 2010s	46	
BrooklynVegan	50 Best Punk & Emo Albums: 2015-2019	10	
Chorus.fm	Top 50 Albums of the 2010s	24	
Paste	The 100 Best Indie Folk Albums of All Time	91	
Sputnikmusic	Top 100 Albums of the 2010s	30	
Uproxx	All The Best Albums Of The 2010s, Ranked	66	
Visions	The 100 Best Albums of the 2010s	27	

== Track listing ==
All tracks are written by Julien Baker.

No.	Title	Length
1.	"Blacktop"	4:43
2.	"Sprained Ankle"	2:22
3.	"Brittle Boned"	3:37
4.	"Everybody Does"	2:25
5.	"Good News"	3:31
6.	"Something"	3:52
7.	"Rejoice"	3:33
8.	"Vessels"	4:26
9.	"Go Home"	5:04
Total length:		33:33

== Personnel ==
Credits for Sprained Ankle adapted from Bandcamp and AllMusic.

- Julien Baker – composer, primary artist
- Michael Hegner – recording engineer (except for tracks 3 and 8)
- Cody Landers – recording engineer (for tracks 3 and 8)
- Josh Bonati – mastering engineer
- Jake Cunningham – cover photography

== Charts ==
Chart performance for Sprained Ankle
Chart (2016–2017)	Peak position
UK Americana Albums (Official Charts)	25
US Heatseekers Albums (Billboard)	23
