= Boygenius (EP) =

2018 EP by Boygenius

EP by Boygenius
- Released: October 26, 2018
- Studios: Sound City (Van Nuys, California)
- Genre: Rock, folk rock
- Length: 21:56
- Label: Matador
- Producers: Julien Baker; Lucy Dacus; Phoebe Bridgers

boygenius chronology
Boygenius (2018)	The Record (2023)

Julien Baker chronology
Turn Out the Lights (2017)	Boygenius (2018)	Little Oblivions (2021)

Phoebe Bridgers chronology
Stranger in the Alps (2017)	Boygenius (2018)	Better Oblivion Community Center (2019)

Lucy Dacus chronology
Historian (2018)	Boygenius (2018)	2019 (2019)

Singles from Boygenius
- 1. "Bite the Hand" Released: August 21, 2018; 2. "Me & My Dog" Released: August 21, 2018; 3. "Stay Down" Released: August 21, 2018

Boygenius is the debut EP by American indie supergroup Boygenius, composed of Julien Baker, Phoebe Bridgers, and Lucy Dacus. It was released on October 26, 2018, by Matador Records.

== Background and recording ==
Singer-songwriters Julien Baker, Phoebe Bridgers and Lucy Dacus self-produced and recorded the EP over four days in June 2018 at Sound City Studios in Los Angeles. The three made the decision to hire exclusively women for the process. Each member of the group brought one mostly-finished song to the studio that received further input from the other two; Baker contributed "Stay Down", Bridgers contributed "Me & My Dog", and Dacus contributed "Bite the Hand". Three additional songs emerged during the recording process from the trio's own demos.

Baker, Bridgers and Dacus formally announced the formation of Boygenius in August 2018. On the same day, three singles, "Bite The Hand", "Stay Down" and "Me & My Dog" were released, and their eponymous EP was scheduled for release on November 9. On October 26, the EP was released digitally, two weeks ahead of schedule.

The album's cover is a reference to Crosby, Stills & Nash, the self-titled 1969 debut album by the American folk rock supergroup consisting of David Crosby, Stephen Stills, and Graham Nash.

== Critical reception ==
Professional ratings
Aggregate scores
Source	Rating
AnyDecentMusic?	8.0/10
Metacritic	84/100
Review scores
Source	Rating
AllMusic	3.5/5 stars
American Songwriter	3.5/5 stars
Consequence of Sound	A
Drowned in Sound	7/10
Entertainment Weekly	B+
Exclaim!	8/10
NME	5/5 stars
Paste	8.8/10
Pitchfork	8.3/10
PopMatters	8/10

Boygenius has received acclaim from critics. At Metacritic, which assigns a normalized rating out of 100 to reviews from mainstream publications, the album received an average score of 84, based on 13 reviews. Rhian Daly of NME gave the EP a perfect score, stating "it serves as a reminder of each musician's particular powers – Bridgers' ability to spin haunting, poetic folk-pop out of beautiful simplicity; Dacus' sage and, often, wry indie-rock; and Baker's dramatic, emo-tinged exorcisms of emotion."

In a review for Pitchfork, Dayna Evans rated the album 8.3/10, writing that each member of Boygenius performs in "distinct musical styles": "For Bridgers, an intimate voice and shy guitar with a folkier bedroom softness; Baker, enormous emo minor tones and a voice that could blow down a building; Dacus, vocals that are clear and confrontational and a guitar shrouded in fuzz. When performed together, it yields an effective kind of magic."

=== Year-end lists ===
Year-end list rankings for Boygenius
Publication	List	Rank	Ref.
Consequence of Sound	Top 50 Albums of 2018	7	
Esquire	Top 20 Albums of 2018	11	
Flood Magazine	Top 25 Albums of 2018	13	
NPR Music	Top 50 Albums of 2018	12	
Under the Radar	Top 100 Albums of 2018	3	
The Wild Honey Pie	Top 30 Albums of 2018	3	

== Track listing ==
All tracks are written by Boygenius (Julien Baker, Phoebe Bridgers, Lucy Dacus), except "Ketchum, ID", written by Boygenius and Christian Lee Hutson.

Boygenius track listing
No.	Title	Length
1.	"Bite the Hand"	3:12
2.	"Me & My Dog"	3:26
3.	"Souvenir"	3:32
4.	"Stay Down"	4:00
5.	"Salt in the Wound"	4:11
6.	"Ketchum, ID"	3:35
Total length:		21:56

== Personnel ==
Credits adapted from liner notes.

Boygenius

- Julien Baker
- Phoebe Bridgers
- Lucy Dacus

Additional personnel

- Anna Butterss – bass
- Elizabeth Goodfellow – drums
- Joseph Lorge – engineering, mixing (on "Me & My Dog")
- Collin Pastore – mixing (except on "Me & My Dog")
- Heba Kadry – mastering
- Lera Pentelute – photo

== Charts ==
Chart performance for Boygenius
Chart (2018–2023)	Peak position
Scottish Albums (Official Charts)	26
UK Album Sales (OCC)	85
UK Independent Albums (Official Charts)	10
US Top Album Sales (Billboard)	33
US Top Alternative Albums (Billboard)	24
US Heatseekers Albums (Billboard)	3
US Independent Albums (Billboard)	9
US Americana/Folk Albums (Billboard)	15
US Indie Store Album Sales (Billboard)	8
