= Medium Build =

- Born: Nicholas Carpenter; May 10, 1991 (age 35)
- Origin: Atlanta, Georgia, U.S.
- Occupation: Singer-songwriter
- Instrument: Vocals
- Labels: Slowplay; Island
- Website: www.mediumbuildmusic.com

Nicholas Carpenter, known by his stage name Medium Build, is an American singer-songwriter. He has released five studio albums and is signed to Slowplay / Island Records.

== Early life ==
Carpenter grew up in Georgia and played music in church. He moved from Atlanta to Nashville at the age of 21 to study songwriting at Middle Tennessee State University. While in college, he interned at Disney Publishing and wrote songs for his indie rock band Little Moses. In 2016, he moved to Alaska and began performing as Medium Build.

== Career ==
Carpenter released his debut album Falling Apart in 2016. He followed up with Softboy and Roughboy, both in 2018. He released Wild, his fourth album, in 2019. In 2022, Carpenter performed with Briston Maroney during the All Aboard Tour. The same year he filmed the music video for "Comeonback" in Anchorage.

Carpenter first charted in 2023 with "Friend for Life", a collaboration with X Ambassadors. The song debuted at No. 17 on Billboard's Alternative Digital Song Sales. Carpenter played South by Southwest in 2023 and also toured with Tyler Childers on his Mule Pull '24 Tour in 2024. He has also toured with Lewis Capaldi and FINNEAS. In 2024, he released the album Country and Marietta EP, with the latter including a collaboration with former college classmate Julien Baker, "Yoke". Also in 2024, he appeared on Holly Humberstone’s single version of her song "Cocoon". He opened for Baker during her Los Angeles residency. He also played at several festivals in 2024, including Outside Lands, All Things Go, and Austin City Limits.

== Personal life ==
Carpenter is bisexual.

== Discography ==
=== Albums ===
List of studio albums
Year	Title	Ref.
2016	Falling Apart	
2018	Softboy	
2018	Roughboy	
2019	Wild	
2024	Country	
2026	King of Having Fun	

=== Extended plays ===
List of EPs
Title	EP details
Health	Released: 2023; Label: Slowplay / Island Records
Health – Live from RCA Studio A	Released: 2023; Label: Slowplay / Island Records
Marietta	Released: 2024; Label: Slowplay / Island Records

=== Singles ===
List of singles
Title	Year	Peak chart positions	
Title	Year	Alternative Digital	Adult Alternative Airplay
"Be Your Boy"	2019	—	—
"99 Corolla"	2020	—	—
"Rabbit"	2021	—	—
"Rage"	2022	—	—
"Never Learned to Dance"	2022	—	—
"Friend for Life" (with X Ambassadors)	2023	17	—
"Say Hi"	2023	—	—
"Cuz of U"	2023	—	—
"In My Room"	2023	—	—
"This Is Life" (with Winnetka Bowling League and Dawes)	2024	—	—
"Triple Marathon"	2024	—	—
"Yoke" (with Julien Baker)	2024	—	—
"Last Time"	2025	—	30
"Armor"	2026	—	—
"Home Depot"	2026	—	17
"In My Gut"	2026	—	—
