= Inheaven =

English four-piece alternative band (2014–2018)

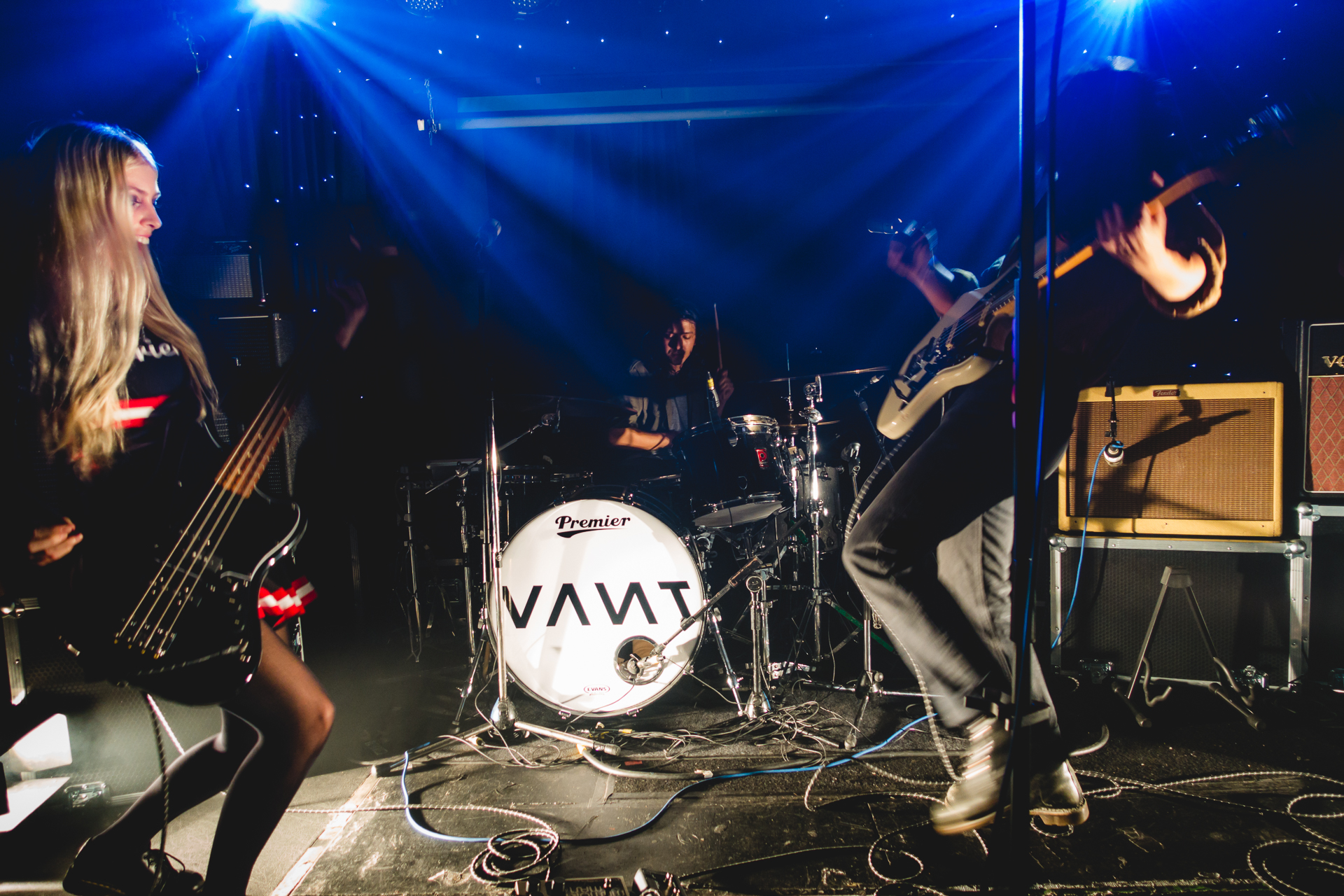
- INHEAVEN live at Dingwalls in 2015. From left to right: Chloe Little, Joe Lazarus and James Taylor. Jake Lucas is off the image, to the right of Taylor.

Background information
- Origin: London, England, UK
- Genres: Indie rock
- Years active: 2014–2018
- Labels: Sony, PIAS, Cult
- Past members: James Taylor(vocals, guitar); Chloe Little (bass, vocals); Joe Lazarus (drums); Jake Lucas (guitar)

Inheaven were an English four-piece alternative band from South London. Formed in 2014, the band released their first single "Regeneration" in 2015 via Julian Casablancas' label Cult Records. The single was supported by BBC Radio 1/BBC6 Music DJs Annie Mac, Phil Taggart, Steve Lamacq and Chris Hawkins. The band were featured in DIY and XFM's ones to watch for 2016 with NME heralding them "one of the UK’s most exciting new bands". The band also topped DIY's readers poll in 2016 coming in first place for Track of the Year, second for band of the year and fourth best live act of the year.

They spent the majority of 2016 and 2017 supporting acts such as Sundara Karma, Circa Waves, Jamie T, Blossoms, Yak and The Magic Gang and played a number of international festivals including Reading and Leeds, Glastonbury and Bilbao BBK live finishing the year with a sold out headline show at London Scala.

On 1 September 2017, they released their debut album to critical acclaim, with NME calling it "Indie’s most dangerously exciting debut-album". In 2018 the band released the stand alone single "Sweet Dreams Baby" in support of their 20 date tour of the United States with Pale Waves.

On Christmas Eve 2018, Inheaven announced they were splitting up. Members Chloe Little and James Taylor subsequently released singles under the name Wings of Desire.

In August 2023, James Taylor and Chloe Little married at Baskerville Hall Hotel, in Herefordshire.

== Discography ==
=== Albums ===
Title	Release date	Track listing
INHEAVEN	1 September 2017	1. "Baby's Alright"; 2. "Treats"; 3. "Stupid Things"; 4. "Vultures"; 5. "All There Is"; 6. "World on Fire"; 7. "Drift"; 8. "Do You Dream"; 9. "Real Love"; 10. "Bitter Town"; 11. "Regeneration"; 12. "Velvet"

=== Singles ===
Title	Release date	Track listing
"Regeneration"	27 August 2015	1. "Regeneration"; 2. "Slow"
"Bitter Town"	30 October 2015	1. "Bitter Town"; 2. "Tangerine"
"Baby's Alright"	1 July 2016	1. "Baby's Alright"; 2. "Meat Somebody"
"All There Is"	29 July 2016	1. "All There Is"
Drift	26 August 2016	1. "Drift"
Treats	9 December 2016	1. "Treats"; 2. "Wasted My Life on Rock n Roll"
Vultures	27 April 2017	1. "Vultures"
"World on Fire"	5 July 2017	1. "World on Fire"
"Stupid Things"	24 August 2017	1. "Stupid Things"

== Music videos ==
Title	Year
"Baby's Alright"	2016
"Meat Somebody"	2016
"All There Is"	2016
"Drift"	2016
"Treats"	2016
"Wasted My Life on Rock & Roll"	2016
Title	Year
"Vultures"	2017
"World on Fire"	2017
"Stupid Things"	2017
