= Mike Marlin =

Background information
- Born: Michael Adam; 17 February 1961 (age 65); Wimbledon, London, England
- Genres: Alternative rock
- Occupation: Singer-songwriter
- Instruments: Vocals, guitar
- Years active: 2009–present
- Label: AMP Music Production
- Website: Official website

Mike Marlin is an English singer-songwriter. He was born on 17 February 1961 in Wimbledon, London as Michael Adam. He went to the University of Oxford where he read physics at Magdalen College. He dropped out in his final year and never graduated. During this time he played bass in a number of student bands.

== History ==
=== Businesses ===
After leaving Oxford (where he was studying physics) in his final year, he dropped out of music. He worked in his father's commodity business. He automated his job by programming a computer, and became instead interested in technology. He was then a founder of a series of technology businesses. He was joined by David Harding and Martin Lueck, with whom he spun out to launch AHL, one of the most successful systematic trading firms ever.

=== Music career ===
Throughout the 1980s and 1990s he had continued to write and record songs, but these were never commercially released.

At the age of 48 he withdrew from business. He started a small record label, AMP Music Productions. He recorded his first album Nearly Man under the name Mike Marlin with producer James Durrant. The album was finished in December 2009. Marlin recruited a band in 2010 ("The Whethermen") and played a series of gigs in small venues throughout the UK. He recorded a session for Selector Radio that aired on 12 November 2010. In December 2010 he supported From The Jam on their UK tour.

Marlin's first single was a cover of the Bee Gees disco hit "Stayin' Alive" from the 1977 film Saturday Night Fever. It was released on 21 October 2010 to mixed reviews and is not on his debut album Nearly Man, which was released on 14 February 2011. Two singles were taken from this album: "Play That Game" (released 4 January 2011) and "No Place Like Home" (released 23 May 2011). These were critically well received and achieved significant airplay on independent radio, regional radio and BBC Radio 6 Music. The video for "Play That Game" attracted considerable attention and featured an office being destroyed.

In January 2011, he was chosen for HMV's Next Big Thing and as part of this event played at the Jazz Cafe in London on 9 February 2011. In March 2011, Marlin supported The Stranglers on their 17 date UK "Black & Blue" tour. In April 2011, Marlin supported Big Country on their 18 date UK tour.

In February 2012, he released his second album, Man on The Ground, and went on to support The Stranglers around the UK and Europe on their Spring tour. Marlin's voice is often compared to David Bowie. He sings in a baritone and plays a custom Babicz guitar. He writes traditional rock songs. He cites David Bowie, Johnny Cash, Elbow and The National as influences.

Marlin's third album, Grand Reveal, was released on 8 April 2013. Songs include "The Murderer" and "Skull Beneath the Skin".

Marlin's fourth album, The Secret of My Success, was released on 8 May 2016. The release was accompanied by a limited edition box set containing book of artwork by Colin Brown, the Scottish Collage artist and double LP. The latest incarnation of his band is a trio, The Melomaniacs, consisting of Marlin, Paul Silver on keys and Kim Murray on guitar.

In October 2018, Marlin released the album "Dust" which accompanied a film of the same time. With the release of the album, Marlin disbanded the Melomaniacs band.

After an absence of some years, Marlin released a new album "We Start with Silence" via streaming services on August 28 2025. The album includes new recordings of songs from Marlin's earlier albums. It was produced by Danton Supple and Danny Monk, recorded at RAK Studios, mastered by John Webber at AIR Studios.

== Discography ==
Albums

- Nearly Man (2009)
- Man on the Ground (2012)
- Grand Reveal (2013)
- The Secret of My Success (2016)
- Dust (2018)
- We Start with Silence (2025)

== Personal ==
He is married and has four children. He lives in Bedfordshire.
