= Re:SET Concert Series =

American outdoor concert series

The Re:SET Concert Series is an outdoor concert series in the United States, launched in 2023. The inaugural edition was headlined by LCD Soundsystem, boygenius, and Steve Lacy.

== History ==
On January 31, 2023, AEG (Anschutz Entertainment Group) Presents announced the inaugural Re:SET Concert Series. Along with the announcement, it was revealed that each headliner curated the lineup specific to their headlining days. Each weekend, the acts rotated between three cities in a surrounding area before moving to the next group of cities. The acts shared one stage, receiving headlining set times, and no sets conflicted.

== 2023 lineup ==
LCD Soundsystem

- Jamie xx
- Idles
- L'Rain (partial dates)
- Big Freedia (partial dates)

Boygenius

- Clairo
- Dijon
- Bartees Strange

Steve Lacy

- James Blake
- Toro Y Moi
- Fousheé

== Tour dates ==
=== 2023 ===
LCD Soundsystem

List of concerts, showing date, city, country, venue, and opening acts
Date	City	Country	Venue	Opening acts
June 2	Stanford (Note: Promoted as Bay Area)	United States	Frost Amphitheater	Jamie xx Idles; Big Freedia
June 3	San Diego	United States	Thrive Park at Snapdragon Stadium	Jamie xx Idles; Big Freedia
June 4	Pasadena (Note: Promoted as Los Angeles)	United States	Brookside at the Rose Bowl	Jamie xx Idles; Big Freedia
June 9	New Orleans	United States	Festival Grounds at City Park	Jamie xx Idles; Big Freedia
June 10	Atlanta	United States	Central Park	Jamie xx Idles; Big Freedia
June 11	Grand Prairie (Note: Promoted as Dallas)	United States	Texas Trust CU Theatre at Grand Prairie	Jamie xx Idles; Big Freedia
June 16	New York	United States	Forest Hills Stadium	Jamie xx Idles; L'Rain
June 17	Boston	United States	The Stage at Suffolk Downs	Jamie xx Idles; L'Rain
June 18	Columbia (Note: Promoted as DMV)	United States	Merriweather Post Pavilion	Jamie xx Idles; L'Rain
June 23	Nashville	United States	The Great Lawn in Centennial Park	Jamie xx Idles; L'Rain
June 24	Columbus	United States	KEMBA Live!	Jamie xx Idles; L'Rain
June 25	Chicago	United States	Riis Park	Jamie xx Idles; L'Rain

Boygenius

List of concerts, showing date, city, country, venue, and opening acts
Date	City	Country	Venue	Opening acts
June 2	San Diego	United States	Thrive Park at Snapdragon Stadium	Clairo; Dijon; Bartees Strange
June 3	Pasadena	United States	Brookside at the Rose Bowl	Clairo; Dijon; Bartees Strange
June 4	Stanford	United States	Frost Amphitheatre	Clairo; Dijon; Bartees Strange
June 9	Grand Prairie	United States	Texas Trust CU Theatre Grounds	Clairo; Dijon; Bartees Strange
June 10	New Orleans	United States	Festival Grounds at City Park	Clairo; Dijon; Bartees Strange
June 11	Atlanta	United States	Central Park	Clairo; Dijon; Bartees Strange
June 16	Columbia	United States	Merriweather Post Pavilion	Clairo; Dijon; Bartees Strange
June 17	New York	United States	Forest Hills Stadium	Clairo; Dijon; Bartees Strange
June 18	Boston	United States	The Stage at Suffolk Down	Clairo; Dijon; Bartees Strange
June 23	Columbus	United States	KEMBA Live!	Clairo; Dijon; Bartees Strange
June 24	Chicago	United States	Riis Park	Clairo; Dijon; Bartees Strange
June 25	Nashville	United States	The Great Lawn in Centennial Park	Clairo; Dijon; Bartees Strange

Steve Lacy

List of concerts, showing date, city, country, venue, and opening acts
Date	City	Country	Venue	Opening acts
June 2	Pasadena	United States	Brookside at the Rose Bowl	James Blake; Toro Y Moi; Fousheé
June 3	Stanford	United States	Frost Amphitheatre	James Blake; Toro Y Moi; Fousheé
June 4	San Diego	United States	Thrive Park at Snapdragon Stadium	James Blake; Toro Y Moi; Fousheé
June 9	Atlanta	United States	Central Park	James Blake; Toro Y Moi; Fousheé
June 10	Grand Prairie	United States	Texas Trust CU Theatre Grounds	James Blake; Toro Y Moi; Fousheé
June 11	New Orleans	United States	Festival Grounds at City Park	James Blake; Toro Y Moi; Fousheé
June 16	Boston	United States	The Stage at Suffolk Down	James Blake; Toro Y Moi; Fousheé
June 17	Columbia	United States	Merriweather Post Pavilion	James Blake; Toro Y Moi; Fousheé
June 18	New York	United States	Forest Hills Stadium	James Blake; Toro Y Moi; Fousheé
June 23	Chicago	United States	Riis Park	James Blake; Toro Y Moi; Fousheé
June 24	Nashville	United States	The Great Lawn in Centennial Park	James Blake; Toro Y Moi; Fousheé
June 25	Columbus	United States	KEMBA Live!	James Blake; Toro Y Moi; Fousheé
