= Indie folk =

Alternative genre of folk music

- Other names: Alternative folk, stomp and holler, stomp clap hey
- Stylistic origins: Alternative rock; contemporary folk; indie rock
- Cultural origins: 1990s

Regional scenes
- Senja (genre)

Other topics
- Folk pop; folk punk; folk rock; neofolk; progressive folk; psychedelic folk

Indie folk (also called alternative folk) is an alternative genre of music that emerged in the 1990s among musicians from indie rock scenes who were influenced by folk music. The genre blends indie rock elements with traditional folk instrumentation and lyrical techniques.

== Characteristics ==
The staff of Paste Magazine said in 2020: "No music genre is particularly easy to define, but “indie folk” is about as nebulous as they come." Indie folk hybridizes the acoustic foundation of traditional folk music with contemporary instrumentation and characteristics of indie rock. The lyrical style commonly includes reflections of raw emotional experience and social commentary through an introspective lens. ‘… This little ukulele tells the truth’: indie pop and kitsch authenticity" from Cambridge University Press, describes indie music as “adept at generating personal authenticity” and creating personal attachment in an age of “impersonal mass culture.” By embracing individuality and the rise of counterculture, indie folk blends the ethos and experimental nature of indie music with the emotional exploration of folk music to produce something unifying and authentic. In combination with soft, contemplative vocals, the instruments most frequently used in the genre include guitar, banjo, mandolin, and ukulele.

== Influences ==
=== 1960s–1970s ===
John Lennon and Bob Dylan have been cited as influences for indie folk, with Phoebe Bridgers, a pioneer of the modern indie folk scene, stating "I love John Lennon... He’s been such an icon for so many people who are my heroes, like Elliott Smith and Daniel Johnston". Another artist who defined the indie folk sound is Nick Drake. NPR article "Remembering Nick Drake” describes Drake's music as both "self effacing and intimate." While artists such as John Lennon and Bob Dylan existed within the mainstream music scene, artists like Nick Drake and Elliott Smith are known for their rejection of mass culture and inauthenticity in music. Additionally, The Velvet Underground was another major influence for the genre as they experienced heavily with their sound, leading to a profound impact on all alternative and indie genres. Some other influences include Elvis Costello, Leonard Cohen, Neil Young, Simon and Garfunkel, The Byrds, Nico, and Joni Mitchell.

== History ==
The genre has its earliest origins in 1990s folk artists who displayed alternative rock influences in their music, such as Ani DiFranco and Dan Bern, and acoustic artists such as Elliott Smith and Will Oldham. As the 1990s came to an end, artists such as Bright Eyes and Ryan Adams entered the scene. Bright Eyes’ 2005 album “I’m Wide Awake, It’s Morning” was critically acclaimed and frontman Conor Oberst received much praise for the depth of his songwriting. The album quickly became an indie folk staple. Some labels, Saddle Creek, Barsuk, Ramseur, and Sub Pop, helped to provide support to indie folk, with artists such as Fleet Foxes breaking into the pop charts with albums such as Helplessness Blues.

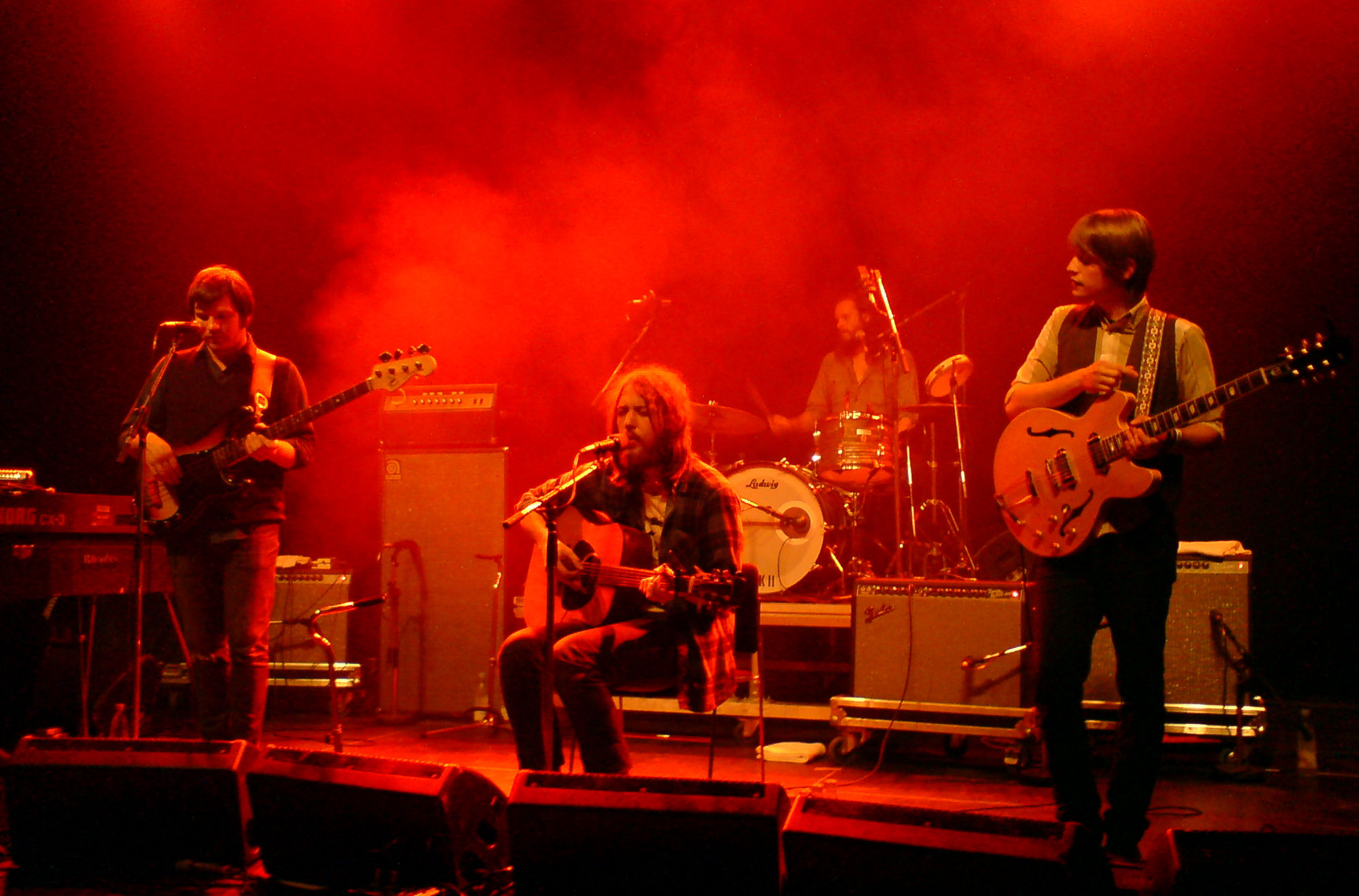
Fleet Foxes

In the United Kingdom, artists such as Ben Howard and Mumford & Sons emerged, with the latter band promoting the music style through their Gentlemen of the Road touring festivals. The success of acts like Mumford & Sons led some music journalists like Popjustice's Peter Robinson labelling this new British music scene as The New Boring or Beige Pop. A decade later, the terms "stomp and holler," "stomp clap hey," and "hoedown pop" were coined to refer retrospectively, sometimes with endearment, to such bands.

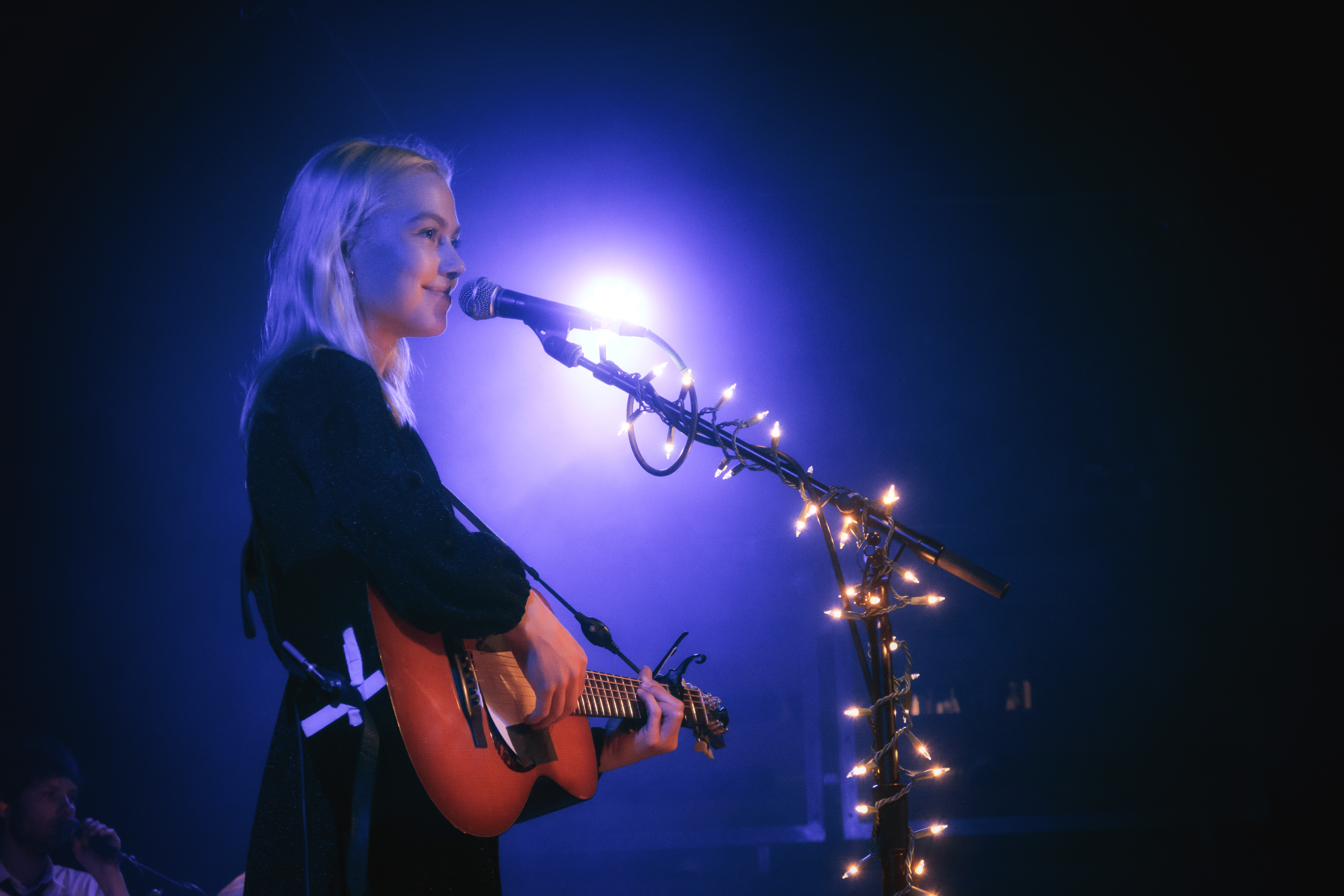
Phoebe Bridgers

In the late 2010s and in the 2020s, artists such as Phoebe Bridgers, Adrianne Lenker, and Julien Baker revived interest in the genre with Bridgers' Punisher and Stranger in the Alps, Lenkers’ songs and instrumentation, and Baker's Sprained Ankle, Turn Out the Lights, and Little Oblivions. Bridgers cites Elliott Smith as a foundational influence on her sound and Lenker with folk icons such as Joni Mitchell and Neil Young.The genre is continuing to gain momentum with emerging artists such as Emma Ogier and Searows continuing the tradition of strong songwriting, folk instrumentation, and authenticity in their music.

== Social context ==
For centuries, folk music has been preserved through oral tradition. Folk music functions as a unifying force that brings individuals together through song. "Folk Singers, Social Reform, and the Red Scare." The Library of Congress Celebrates the Songs of America, Library of Congress article attributes folk music revivals to times of social unrest, with some examples being the years following the Great Depression and all throughout the 1960s- a transformative decade of social reform. Bob Dylan and Joni Mitchell, as mentioned above, were key artists in the 1960s and 1970s folk music scene; acclaimed for their authenticity and breakaway from mainstream mass culture, these artists are recognized today as voices of a generation. Michael Strand's "Authenticity as a Form of Worth," Journal for Cultural Research, piece argues that indie musicians and songs “embody an inspirational worth achieved through demonstrations of autonomy." Both indie and folk music possess similar ideals of freedom and expression- which explains the hybridization of indie folk that emerged in the 1990s. While the 1960s experienced that of a social revolution, the 1990s experienced one that was both social and digital. The emergence of the internet and increased media consumption was a playing factor in the birth of indie folk- a genre that blended the folk tradition of storytelling and authenticity with contemporary indie counterculture, described as “counter-hegemonic”, or anti-establishment, by David Hesmondhalgh in "Indie: The Institutional Politics and Aesthetics of a Popular Music Genre." Cultural Studies.
