= Forever Is a Feeling =

- Current album cover on streaming services; original cover featured the portrait of Dacus in full view

Studio album by Lucy Dacus
- Released: March 28, 2025
- Genres: Indie rock; folk-pop
- Length: 43:32
- Label: Geffen
- Producers: Lucy Dacus; Melina Duterte; Jake Finch; Andrew Lappin; Blake Mills; Collin Pastore; Bartees Strange

Lucy Dacus chronology
The Rest (2023)	Forever Is a Feeling (2025)

Singles from Forever Is a Feeling
- 1. "Ankles / Limerence" Released: January 15, 2025; 2. "Best Guess" Released: February 10, 2025; 3. "Talk" Released: March 12, 2025

Forever Is a Feeling is the fourth studio album by American musician Lucy Dacus, released on March 28, 2025, via Geffen Records. To promote the album, Dacus embarked on the Forever Is a Feeling Tour.

Forever Is a Feeling is Dacus' major label debut as a solo artist. Her previous three studio albums No Burden, Historian, and Home Video were released on indie label Matador Records.

== Background and promotion ==
In 2024, Lucy Dacus appeared as a special guest at two of her Boygenius bandmate Julien Baker's shows, where she performed two unreleased tracks. In late 2024 she announced a series of shows in small venues, claiming she would be playing mostly new music.

On January 15, 2025, Dacus performed the song "Ankles" on The Tonight Show Starring Jimmy Fallon. The album was announced the following morning alongside the premiere of the studio version and a music video for the song, starring actress Havana Rose Liu. "Ankles" was released as a double single along with the B-side "Limerence". Dacus also announced a tour the same day, with Katie Gavin and Jasmine.4.T as openers.

The second single from the album, "Best Guess", was released on February 10, 2025, alongside a music video starring Towa Bird, Naomi McPherson, E.R. Fightmaster, and Cara Delevingne, which was first teased via an open casting call.

Forever is a Feeling includes contributions from Hozier, Phoebe Bridgers, Julien Baker, Blake Mills, Bartees Strange, Madison Cunningham, and Melina Duterte.

In October 2025, an expanded version of Lucy's album was released, named Forever Is A Feeling: The Archives. Bonus materials on this edition include live tracks, demo recordings, several new songs, as well as a cover of the Jim Croce hit ‘Time In A Bottle’ from the 1970s.

== Composition and lyrics ==
The material on Forever Is a Feeling is said to be a progression in maturity compared to Home Video. Marcy Donelson of AllMusic described the content as "examining 'it's complicated' relationships through an adult lens." She also assessed, "The album as a whole is tender and affectionate, seeming to accept and appreciate even the awkward and unrequited as part of her embrace of complexity and queerness." In a profile interview with The New Yorker, Dacus said the album is about coming to terms with her feelings for her Boygenius bandmate Julien Baker. The production and instrumentation on the album are said to be "more expansive" than on previous releases. Additionally, the album incorporates violin, programmed drums, synthesizers, 12-string guitar, and keyboards. The fourth track, "Limerence", has been described as "cabaret-like."

== Critical reception ==
Professional ratings
Aggregate scores
Source	Rating
AnyDecentMusic?	7.1/10
Metacritic	75/100
Review scores
Source	Rating
AllMusic	4/5 stars
Clash	6/10
DIY	4/5 stars
The Guardian	3/5 stars
NME	4/5 stars
Paste	8.0/10
Pitchfork	6.1/10
Rolling Stone	4/5 stars
The Skinny	3/5 stars
Slant Magazine	3.5/5 stars

On the review aggregator site Metacritic, which assigns a normalized score out of 100 to ratings from publications, Forever Is a Feeling holds a weighted mean of 75 based on 17 critics' reviews, indicating "generally favorable" reception. The site AnyDecentMusic? gave it a score of 7.1 out of 10, based on their assessment of the critical consensus from 12 reviews.

AllMusic gave the album four stars out of five, with critic Marcy Donelson describing the album as "examining 'it's complicated' relationships through an adult lens on songs that are no less personal, vulnerable, or touching" than those on Home Video.

== Track listing ==
All tracks are written by Lucy Dacus.

Forever Is a Feeling track listing
No.	Title	Producer(s)	Length
1.	"Calliope Prelude"	Lucy Dacus	1:16
2.	"Big Deal"	Dacus; Blake Mills; Collin Pastore; Jake Finch; Bartees Strange^{[a]}	4:19
3.	"Ankles"	Dacus; Mills; Pastore; Finch	3:11
4.	"Limerence"	Dacus	3:12
5.	"Modigliani"	Dacus; Mills; Pastore; Finch; Andrew Lappin	3:06
6.	"Talk"	Dacus; Mills; Pastore; Finch	3:17
7.	"For Keeps"	Dacus; Mills	2:11
8.	"Forever Is a Feeling"	Dacus; Mills; Pastore; Finch; Lappin; Strange; Melina Duterte	3:12
9.	"Come Out"	Dacus; Mills; Lappin	3:48
10.	"Best Guess"	Dacus; Lappin; Strange	4:00
11.	"Bullseye" (with Hozier)	Dacus; Mills	3:23
12.	"Most Wanted Man"	Dacus; Mills; Pastore; Finch	3:54
13.	"Lost Time"	Dacus; Mills; Pastore; Finch; Lappin; Strange	4:43
Total length:			43:32

Note

- ^{^[a]} signifies an additional producer.

== Personnel ==
=== Musicians ===
- Lucy Dacus – lead vocals (all tracks), acoustic guitar (tracks 2, 6, 9, 11), synthesizer (8, 10), percussion (8), celesta (10)
- Phoenix Rousiamanis – violin (tracks 1–4, 6), piano (4, 8); celesta, toy piano (9); pump organ (12)
- Blake Mills – acoustic guitar (tracks 2, 3, 6, 7, 9, 13), fretless bass guitar (2, 5, 6, 11), piano (2, 5), gamelan (2), electric guitar (3, 5, 6, 12), synthesizer (5, 6, 11–13), bass guitar (5, 8, 9, 12), synth bass (6, 12, 13), tenor guitar (6); drums, Moog bass (11, 13); harmonica, keyboards, programming (11)
- Jake Finch – drums (tracks 2, 3, 5, 6, 8, 12, 13), bass guitar (2, 3, 12, 13), acoustic guitar (2, 3, 13), synth bass (2), cello (3), synthesizer (6, 8, 13), strings (6), Moog bass (8, 13), percussion (9, 13); electric guitar, mandolin, piano (13)
- Abe Rounds – drums (tracks 3, 5, 6, 11, 12), percussion (9, 12)
- Karl McComas-Reichl – cello (tracks 3, 6)
- Phoebe Bridgers – vocals (tracks 5, 8)
- Julien Baker – background vocals (track 6), vocals (8, 12)
- Collin Pastore – pedal steel guitar (tracks 6, 13), piano (6)
- Ted Poor – gamelan (track 8), drums (9, 11, 12), percussion (12)
- Hannah Kim (Luna Li)– harp (tracks 8, 9)
- Madison Cunningham – acoustic guitar (tracks 8, 10), electric guitar (10)
- Bartees Strange – drums, piano, synthesizer (track 8); triangle (10)
- Andrew Lappin – drum programming (track 8); shaker, tambourine (10)
- Melina Duterte – drum programming, synthesizer (track 8); bass guitar (10)
- Chloe Saavedra – drums (track 10)
- Benny Bock – Mellotron, synthesizer (track 10)
- Andrew Hozier-Byrne – vocals (track 11)

=== Technical ===
- Ruairi O'Flaherty – mastering
- Lars Stalfors – mixing
- Will Maclellan – engineering (tracks 1, 2, 4–6, 8, 9, 12, 13)
- Collin Pastore – engineering (tracks 2, 3, 5, 6, 8, 9, 12, 13)
- Preston Cochran – engineering (tracks 2, 3, 5, 6, 8, 12, 13)
- Jake Finch – engineering (tracks 2, 3, 5, 6, 13)
- Andrew Lappin – engineering (tracks 2, 3, 5, 8–10, 13)
- Joseph Lorge – engineering (tracks 2, 3)
- David Boucher – engineering (tracks 3, 5, 6–9, 11–13)
- Bartees Strange – engineering (tracks 3, 10)
- Michael O'Brien – engineering (track 11)
- Lucy Dacus – engineering (track 13)
- Hamish Patrick – additional mixing
- Pat McCaul – additional engineering (track 11)

== Charts ==
Chart performance for Forever Is a Feeling
Chart (2025)	Peak position
Australian Albums (ARIA)	49
Austrian Albums (Ö3 Austria)	23
Belgian Albums (Ultratop Flanders)	22
Canadian Albums (Billboard)	84
Croatian International Albums (HDU)	20
Dutch Albums (Album Top 100)	15
German Albums (Offizielle Top 100)	21
Irish Albums (Official Charts)	20
New Zealand Albums (RMNZ)	14
Scottish Albums (Official Charts)	4
Spanish Albums (PROMUSICAE)	92
Swiss Albums (Schweizer Hitparade)	90
UK Albums (Official Charts)	5
UK Americana Albums (Official Charts)	2
US Billboard 200	16
US Americana/Folk Albums (Billboard)	1
US Top Rock & Alternative Albums (Billboard)	2
