= Forever Is a Feeling Tour =

2025 concert tour by Lucy Dacus

- Tour by Lucy Dacus
- Location: Europe; North America
- Associated album: Forever Is a Feeling
- Start date: February 18, 2025
- End date: May 19, 2026
- Legs: 4
- No. of shows: 81
- Supporting acts: Jasmine.4.T; Jay Som; Julia Jacklin; Katie Gavin; Slow Pulp

Lucy Dacus concert chronology
- Home Video Tour (2022); Forever Is a Feeling Tour (2025–2026)

The Forever Is a Feeling tour is the fourth concert tour by American indie rock musician Lucy Dacus in support of her fourth studio album Forever Is a Feeling (2025).

== Background ==
In October 2024, Dacus was a special guest at Julien Baker's Brooklyn Steel concert, where she debuted new music. In December 2024, Dacus announced a small amount of tour dates in small venues for early 2025. At the shows, even more new music was debuted. In January, Dacus announced her fourth full-length album alongside the "Forever is a Feeling Tour". Alongside the tour announcement, Dacus announced that Katie Gavin and Jasmine.4.T would be opening up the North American portion of the tour. In April 2025, Dacus announced more North American tour dates for the fall, with Jay Som and Julia Jacklin opening select dates.

== Tour dates ==
List of concerts, showing date, city, country, venue, and opening acts
Date	City	Country	Venue	Opening acts
February 18, 2025	New York City (Note: Labelled as "Brooklyn" in promotional material)	United States	St. Ann & the Holy Trinity Church	—N/a
February 20, 2025	Chicago	United States	The Murphy Auditorium at the Driehaus Museum	—N/a
February 22, 2025	San Francisco	United States	Legion of Honor	—N/a
February 24, 2025	Los Angeles	United States	Secret location	—N/a
April 16, 2025	Philadelphia	United States	Metropolitan Opera House	Katie Gavin, Jasmine.4.T
April 18, 2025	Washington, D.C.	United States	The Anthem	Katie Gavin, Jasmine.4.T
April 19, 2025	Washington, D.C.	United States	The Anthem	Katie Gavin, Jasmine.4.T
April 20, 2025	Boston	United States	MGM Music Hall at Fenway	Katie Gavin, Jasmine.4.T
April 21, 2025	Boston	United States	MGM Music Hall at Fenway	Katie Gavin, Jasmine.4.T
April 23, 2025	New York City	United States	Radio City Music Hall	Katie Gavin, Jasmine.4.T
April 24, 2025	New York City	United States	Radio City Music Hall	Katie Gavin, Jasmine.4.T
April 25, 2025	Toronto	Canada	Massey Hall	Katie Gavin, Jasmine.4.T
April 26, 2025	Toronto	Canada	Massey Hall	Katie Gavin, Jasmine.4.T
April 29, 2025	Nashville	United States	Ryman Auditorium	Katie Gavin, Jasmine.4.T
April 30, 2025	Nashville	United States	Ryman Auditorium	Katie Gavin, Jasmine.4.T
May 1, 2025	Chicago	United States	Chicago Theatre	Katie Gavin, Jasmine.4.T
May 2, 2025	Chicago	United States	Chicago Theatre	Katie Gavin, Jasmine.4.T
May 5, 2025	St. Paul	United States	Palace Theatre	Katie Gavin, Jasmine.4.T
May 6, 2025	St. Paul	United States	Palace Theatre	Katie Gavin, Jasmine.4.T
May 7, 2025	Kansas City	United States	Midland Theatre	Katie Gavin, Jasmine.4.T
May 9, 2025	Dallas	United States	Margot and Bill Winspear Opera House	Katie Gavin, Jasmine.4.T
May 10, 2025	Austin	United States	Moody Amphitheater	Katie Gavin, Jasmine.4.T
May 12, 2025	Morrison	United States	Red Rocks Amphitheatre	Katie Gavin, Jasmine.4.T
May 14, 2025	Los Angeles	United States	Greek Theatre	Katie Gavin, Jasmine.4.T
May 15, 2025	Los Angeles	United States	Greek Theatre	Katie Gavin, Jasmine.4.T
June 8, 2025 (Note: There will be an early show and a late show performed in Bristol)	Bristol	England	Trinity Centre	—N/a
June 9, 2025 (Note: There will be an early show and a late show performed in Kingston upon Thames)	Kingston upon Thames (Note: Labelled as "Kingston" in promotional material)	England	Pryzm	—N/a
June 11, 2025 (Note: The concert on June 11th is part of Bergenfest)	Bergen	Norway	Bergenhus Fortress	—N/a
June 12, 2025	Oslo	Norway	Rockefeller Oslo	—N/a
June 14, 2025 (Note: The concert on June 14th is part of Best Kept Secret)	Hilvarenbeek	Netherlands	Speelland Beekse Bergen	—N/a
June 16, 2025	Amsterdam	Netherlands	Paradiso	—N/a
June 17, 2025	Amsterdam	Netherlands	Paradiso	—N/a
June 18, 2025	Berlin	Germany	Astra Kulturhaus	—N/a
June 19, 2025	Berlin	Germany	Astra Kulturhaus	—N/a
June 21, 2025 (Note: The concert on June 21st is part of Southside Festival)	Neuhausen ob Eck (Note: Labelled as Tuttlingen in promotional material)	Germany	Neuhausen ob Eck Airfield	—N/a
June 22, 2025 (Note: The concert on June 22nd is part of Hurricane Festival)	Scheeßel	Germany	Eichenring	—N/a
June 24, 2025	Brussels	Belgium	Ancienne Belgique	—N/a
June 25, 2025	Paris	France	Trianon	—N/a
June 26, 2025	London	England	Brixton Academy	—N/a
June 28, 2025 (Note: The concert on June 28th is part of Glastonbury Festival)	Pilton (Note: Labelled as "Somerset" in promotional materials)	England	Worthy Farm	—N/a
June 30, 2025	Edinburgh	Scotland	Usher Hall	—N/a
July 1, 2025	Glasgow	Scotland	Barrowland Ballroom	—N/a
July 2, 2025	Manchester	England	Manchester Academy	—N/a
July 3, 2025	Dublin	Ireland	Iveagh Gardens	—N/a
July 5, 2025 (Note: The concert on July 5th is part of Roskilde Festival)	Roskilde	Denmark	Roskilde Festivalpladsen	—N/a
July 25, 2025	Philadelphia	United States	Franklin Delano Roosevelt Park	Hop Along, Jay Som
July 26, 2025	Columbus	United States	KEMBA Live!	Jay Som
July 27, 2025	Milwaukee	United States	Riverside Theater	Jay Som
July 29, 2025	Detroit	United States	Detroit Masonic Temple	Jay Som
July 30, 2025	Lewiston	United States	Earl W. Brydges Artpark State Park	Jay Som
August 1, 2025 (Note: The concert on August 1st is part of Osheaga Festival)	Montreal	Canada	Jean-Drapeau Park	—N/a
August 2, 2025	Shelburne	United States	The Green at Shelburne Museum	—N/a
August 3, 2025 (Note: The concert on August 3rd is part of Back Cove Music & Arts Festival)	Portland	United States	Payson Park	—N/a
August 8, 2025	Portland	United States	Multnomah County Poor Farm	Julia Jacklin
August 9, 2025	Boise	United States	Morrison Center	Julia Jacklin
August 10, 2025	Carnation	United States	Remlinger Farms	Julia Jacklin
August 12, 2025	Vancouver	Canada	Queen Elizabeth Theatre	Julia Jacklin
August 16, 2025	Berkeley	United States	Greek Theatre	Julia Jacklin
September 9, 2025	San Diego	United States	CalCoast Credit Union Open Air Theatre	Slow Pulp
September 11, 2025	Phoenix	United States	Arizona Financial Theatre	Slow Pulp
September 13, 2025	Oklahoma City	United States	Criterion Theatre	Slow Pulp
September 15, 2025	St. Louis	United States	Stiefel Theatre	Slow Pulp
September 16, 2025	Indianapolis	United States	Murat Theater	Slow Pulp
September 17, 2025	Louisville	United States	Louisville Palace Theatre	Slow Pulp
September 19, 2025	Richmond	United States	Altria Theater	Slow Pulp
September 20, 2025	Durham	United States	Durham Performing Arts Center	Slow Pulp
September 21, 2025 (Note: The concert on September 21st is part of Shaky Knees Music Festival)	Atlanta	United States	Central Park	—N/a
September 23, 2025	Asheville	United States	Asheville Yards	Slow Pulp
September 24, 2025	Pittsburgh	United States	Benedum Center	Slow Pulp
September 26, 2025 (Note: The concerts on September 26 and September 27, 2025, are part of the All Things Go Music Festival.)	Forest Hills	United States	Forest Hills Stadium	—N/a
September 27, 2025	Columbia	United States	Merriweather Post Pavilion	—N/a
November 14, 2025 (Note: This concert is part of the Corona Capital.)	Mexico City	Mexico	Autódromo Hermanos Rodríguez	—N/a
February 5, 2026	Auckland	New Zealand	Laneway Festival	—N/a
February 7, 2026	Gold Coast, Queensland	Australia	Laneway Festival	—N/a
February 8, 2026	Sydney	Australia	Laneway Festival	—N/a
February 10, 2026	Sydney	Australia	Sydney Opera House	—N/a
February 12, 2026	Melbourne	Australia	Forum Theatre	—N/a
February 13, 2026	Melbourne	Australia	Laneway Festival	—N/a
February 14, 2026	Adelaide	Australia	Laneway Festival	—N/a
February 15, 2026	Perth	Australia	Laneway Festival	—N/a
February 18, 2026	Tokyo	Japan	Zepp Shinjuku	—N/a
May 10, 2026	Bellingham	United States	Mount Baker Theater	—N/a
May 12, 2026	Vancouver	Canada	Queen Elizabeth Theatre	—N/a
May 13, 2026	Eugene	United States	McDonald Theater	—N/a
May 14, 2026	Sacramento	United States	Channel 24	—N/a
May 16, 2026 (Note: The concert on May 16 is part of Kilby Block Party)	Salt Lake City	United States	Utah State Fairpark	—N/a
May 18, 2026	San Francisco	United States	Castro Theatre	—N/a
May 19, 2026	San Francisco	United States	Castro Theatre	—N/a
