= Crooks & Nannies =

American indie rock duo

Crooks & Nannies is an American indie rock duo from Philadelphia, Pennsylvania. The duo consists of Sam Huntington and Max Rafter.

== History ==
The duo released their first album in 2015 titled Soup For My Girlfriend. The group's second album, Ugly Laugh, was released in 2016. In January 2023, the group released an EP titled No Fun. The group released their third full-length album and first through Grand Jury on August 25, 2023, titled Real Life.

In 2022, the group opened for Lucy Dacus on tour.
