= Hot & Heavy (Lucy Dacus song) =

Single by Lucy Dacus

from the album Home Video
- Released: 2021
- Genre: Indie rock
- Songwriter: Lucy Dacus

"Hot and Heavy" is a song by American indie rock singer-songwriter Lucy Dacus, serving as a single for her 2021 album Home Video.

== Release and promotion ==
The song was released simultaeously with the album's announcement and the release of its self-directed music video. On April 13, 2021 Dacus performed the song on The Late Show with Stephen Colbert.

== Composition and lyrics ==
Dacus said the song was about "outgrowing past versions of [her]self." In a public statement, she said: "So much of life is submitting to change and saying goodbye even if you don't want to. Now whenever I go to places that used to be significant to me, it feels like trespassing the past. I know that the teen version of me wouldn't approve of me now, and that's embarrassing and a little bit heartbreaking, even if I know intellectually that I like my life and who I am."

Guitar World said the track "sees the singer-songwriter meld rich layers of rhythm guitar textures with a yearning, nostalgic vocal."

== Music video ==
The track's music video was self directed by Dacus, and was filmed at the historic Byrd Theatre in Richmond, Virginia. The video contains a montage of home video footage from Dacus' childhood. Marin Leong co-directed the video.
