= 2019 (disambiguation) =

2019 was a common year starting on Tuesday of the Gregorian calendar. It may also refer to:

- 2019 (number), a number that can be represented with a sum of 3 prime numbers
- 2019, After the Fall of New York, a 1983 Italian film
- 2019 (EP), by Lucy Dacus, 2019
- 2019, an album by Inoran
- "2019", a single by Pomme

== See also ==
- Coronavirus disease 2019 (COVID-19), a disease caused by SARS-CoV-2
