= Night Shift (Lucy Dacus song) =

2017 indie rock song

Single by Lucy Dacus

from the album Historian
- Released: December 12, 2017
- Genre: Indie rock
- Length: 6:31
- Label: Matador
- Songwriter: Lucy Dacus
- Producers: Lucy Dacus; Jacob Blizard; Collin Pastore

Lucy Dacus singles chronology
"Strange Torpedo" (2016)	"Night Shift" (2017)	"Addictions" (2018)

Music video
- "Night Shift" on YouTube

"Night Shift" is a song by American indie rock musician Lucy Dacus. It was released as the lead single from her album Historian on December 12, 2017.

== Background ==
Dacus described the song as, "The only breakup song I've ever written." It was inspired by her relationship with her former bassist, with whom she broke up after finishing the tour for her previous album No Burden. She said that her decision to include it as the opening track on the album was:

Very deliberate! A breakup song is so immediately relatable. A first genuine heartbreak is a look into reimagining what your life is going to look like. If you accommodate somebody else and you think they’re going to be part of your life and then they’re not, you have to reform. The rest of the album has that reforming quality — having the rug pulled out from underneath you, and coming back.

== Reception ==
"Night Shift" was released to critical acclaim. Andrew Marantz of The New Yorker described it as "a cathartic, bridge-burning, no-fucks-given breakup song." Julien Luebbers of The Spokesman-Review wrote that the song was "a vibrant example of linear construction, the song building from soft guitar and vocals to headbanging passion and some seriously impressive singing," and Layla Halabian of The Fader named it, "One of the great breakup songs of all time." James Rettig of Stereogum called it "A six-and-a-half-minute sprawl that earns every one of those seconds," and, "A marvel of songwriting," while Bob Boilen of NPR Music's program All Songs Considered declared it "One of 2018's great songs." The song has been praised for its pacing, lyricism, and instrumentation that lies between confessional songwriting and punk. Gabbie Nirenburg of independent music magazine No Ripcord was more mixed in her assessment, saying it "has a memorable chorus and bridge, but it is entirely too predictable to stand up to Dacus’s earlier work."

In 2019, NPR Music listeners picked "Night Shift" as one of the top 25 songs of the decade.

=== Year-end lists ===
"Night Shift" on year-end lists
Publication	List	Rank	Ref.
Spin	101 Best Songs of 2018	96	
Pitchfork	The 100 Best Songs of 2018	50	
Rolling Stone	50 Best Songs of 2018	30	
Paste	The 50 Best Songs of 2018	3	
NPR Music	The 100 Best Songs of 2018	2	

=== Decade-end lists ===
"Night Shift" on decade-end lists
Publication	List	Rank	Ref.
Stereogum	The 200 Best Songs of the 2010s	176	
Rolling Stone	100 Best Songs of the 2010s	35	
NPR Music	The 2010s: NPR Listeners Pick Their Top Songs of the Decade	14	
Paste	100 Best Songs of the 2010s	11	

== Music video ==
At the time of the song's release, Dacus and her label did not have the time or funding available to produce a music video. In 2023, five years from Historian's release, Dacus worked with Jane Schoenbrun, Jasmin Savoy Brown, Phoebe Bridgers, and others to release a video featuring Dacus as a hotel employee who stumbles across a fantastical party.

== Certifications ==
Region	Certification	Certified units/sales
United States (RIAA)	Gold	500,000^{‡}
^{‡} Sales+streaming figures based on certification alone.
