= Slow Pulp =

American indie rock band

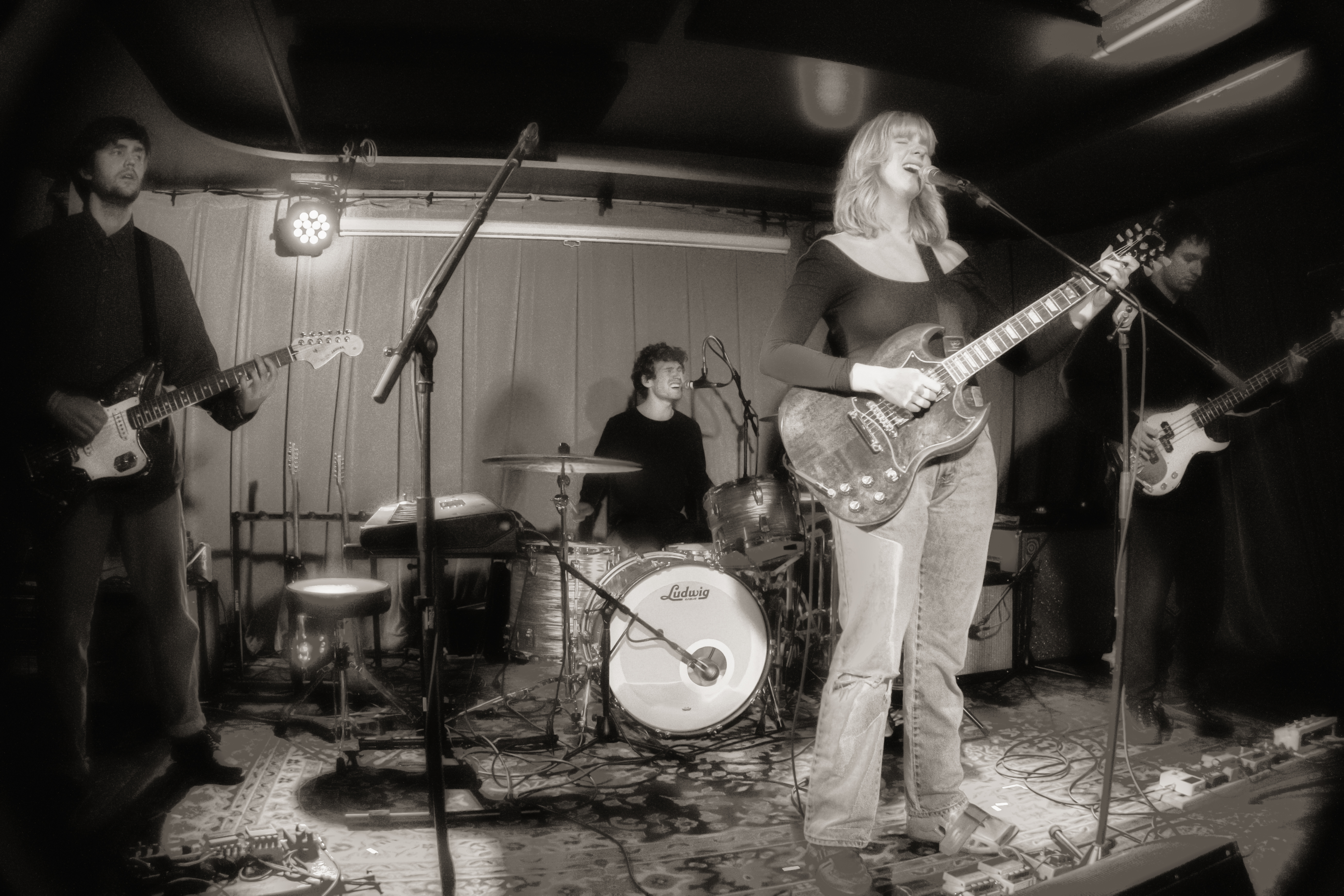
- Slow Pulp performing in 2021

Background information
- Origin: Madison, Wisconsin, U.S.
- Genres: Indie rock; indie pop; bedroom pop; indie folk; alt-country
- Years active: 2015–present
- Labels: Anti-; Winspear
- Members: Emily Massey; Alex Leeds; Teddy Mathews; Henry Stoehr
- Website: slowpulp.com

Slow Pulp is an American indie rock band from Madison, Wisconsin, currently based in Chicago, Illinois. Formed in 2015, the band has held the same line-up since 2017: Emily Massey on lead vocals and rhythm guitar, Alex Leeds on bass and backing vocals, Teddy Matthews on drums and percussion, and Henry Stoehr on lead guitar. The band have released three studio albums to date: Moveys (2020), Yard (2023), and Melodie (2026).

== History ==
Slow Pulp began in 2015 after childhood friends Teddy Mathews, Alex Leeds, and Henry Stoehr decided to start a band. This resulted in their first release, an extended play titled EP1, that same year. In this early formation, Leeds served as the band's lead vocalist. In early 2017, the band were joined by a second guitarist, Emily Massey. Originally also providing backing vocals to Leeds, the decision was soon made for the pair to swap roles. Massey's debut with the band came with the release of EP2 that March, although it was largely written and recorded prior to her joining. EP1 was later removed from the band's Bandcamp page. In 2019, the group released their third EP, Big Day.

The group was midway through recording its debut studio album, Moveys, when the COVID-19 pandemic hit; it was recorded remotely and released on October 9, 2020. The album received positive reviews. In support of the album, the band embarked on their first headlining tour, and also supported Death Cab for Cutie, Pixies, and Alvvays.

In February 2023, the band signed to Anti-, with whom they released their second studio album, Yard, in September of that year. Four singles were released from the album throughout the year in the lead-up to its release: "Cramps" in February, "Slugs" in June, "Doubt" in July, and "Broadview" in August. Following the album's release, Slow Pulp embarked on a tour through North America and Europe in late 2023.

In April and May 2024, the band joined on the North American leg of The Postal Service and Death Cab for Cutie's co-headlining tour, marking the 20th anniversaries of their albums Give Up and Transatlanticism respectively. Also in April, the band released a cover of Lifehouse's "Hanging by a Moment" through Anti-, a recording originally made for a charity compilation organized by The Fader. In August 2024, Slow Pulp performed at Lollapalooza in Chicago's Grant Park, while also opening for Ethel Cain at a festival aftershow at Thalia Hall.

On January 31, 2025, the band marked the fifth anniversary of Moveys with a deluxe edition reissue through Winspear, which presented the album on vinyl for the first time with added live recordings from the band's KEXP session along, with alternate versions of tracks from the Deleted Scenes EP. In September, the band opened for Lucy Dacus on several North American dates of her Forever Is a Feeling Tour.

In May 2026, Slow Pulp announced a headlining North American tour scheduled for the fall of 2026. On June 10, 2026, the band announced their third studio album, Melodie, which was released on September 18, 2026, through Anti-. The band released the album's lead single, "Better Man", on the same day, accompanied by a music video directed by Ben Turok. Melodie marked the band's first album made with an outside producer, Elliott Kozel, who shared production duties with Stoehr and Massey. Stoehr, who had produced the band's previous records on his own, also took on a larger songwriting role, writing five of the album's eleven songs. The supporting tour is set to include the band's largest hometown show to date at Chicago's Salt Shed, taking place on November 19, 2026. A second single, "Not for Nothing", a piano ballad written by Stoehr, followed on July 7, 2026, alongside the announcement of United Kingdom and European tour dates for 2027. In October 2026, the band performed an acoustic SiriusXM session in which they covered Pearl Jam's "Better Man" – an allusion to releasing their own song with the same title earlier that year.

== Band members ==
- Alex Leeds – bass (2015–present), backing vocals (2017–present), lead vocals (2015–2017)
- Teddy Mathews – drums, percussion (2015–present)
- Henry Stoehr – lead guitar (2015–present)
- Emily Massey – lead vocals, rhythm guitar (2017–present), backing vocals (2017)

== Discography ==
=== Studio albums ===
- Moveys (2020, Winspear)
- Yard (2023, Anti-)
- Melodie (2026, Anti-)

=== EPs ===
- EP1 (2015, self-released)
- EP2 (2017, self-released)
- Big Day (2019, self-released)
- Deleted Scenes (2021, Winspear)

=== Reissues ===
- Moveys (Deluxe Edition) (2025, Winspear)
