= Jasmine.4.T =

British indie singer-songwriter

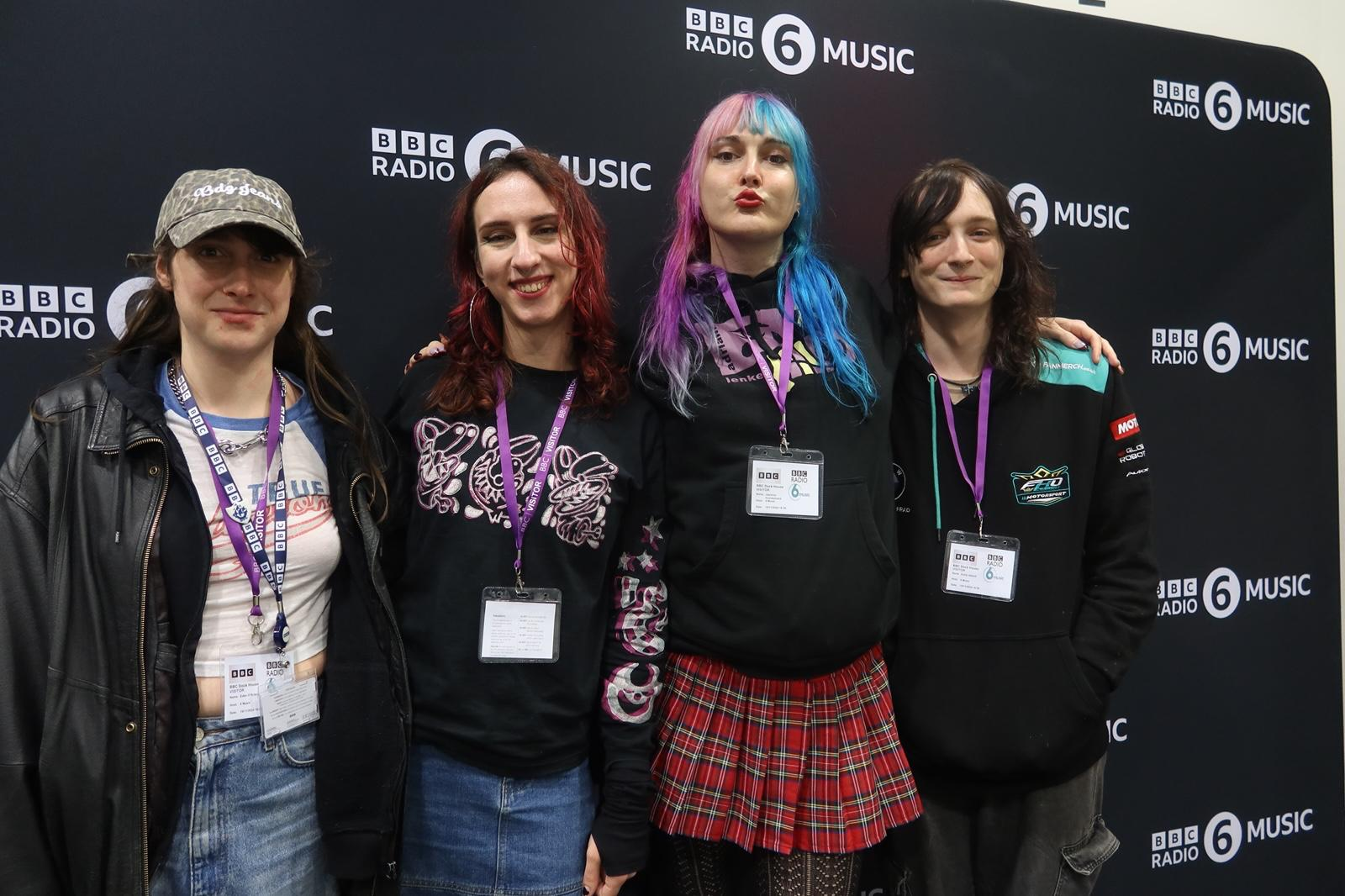
- Jasmine.4.T and backing band after performing on BBC Radio 6 Music; left to right: Eden, Phoenix, Jasmine, Emily

Background information
- Origin: United Kingdom
- Genres: Indie rock; indie folk
- Years active: 2019–present
- Labels: Saddest Factory Records; Interscope
- Website: www.jasmine4t.com

Jasmine.4.T is the stage name of British indie rock singer-songwriter Jasmine Cruickshank, who plays as part of a four-piece based in Manchester, England and is currently signed to Saddest Factory Records. Jasmine is the first British musician to be signed to the label.

== Early life ==
Cruickshank is from Bristol.

== Career ==
In 2019, Jasmine.4.T released her debut EP titled Worn Through through Bristol-based label Breakfast Records which she co-founded.

After having opened for Lucy Dacus on tour, Jasmine decided to submit some demos to Lucy's Boygenius bandmate Phoebe Bridgers' record label, Saddest Factory Records. After submitting the demos, Cruickshank was told by Dacus, "Okay, I just played your demos for Phoebe [Bridgers] in the car; She's on the phone to her manager, trying to work out how she can sign you". After signing to the label, being the first UK artist to do so, she released a new single titled "Skin On Skin", a song about her falling in love with a trans person for the first time, featuring Julien Baker and produced by Boygenius.

== Personal life ==
In 2020, Cruickshank underwent heart surgery, having been living with ME and long COVID.

Jasmine is a trans woman and describes herself as queer. After coming out and her marriage ending, she moved to Manchester.

== Discography ==
=== EPs ===
- Worn Through (2019)

=== Singles ===
- "Skin On Skin" (2024)
- "You Are The Morning" (2024)
- "Elephant" (2024)

=== Albums ===
- You Are The Morning (2025)
