= Julien Baker and Phoebe Bridgers with Lucy Dacus Tour =

2018 concert tour by Boygenius

- Tour by Boygenius
- Location: North America
- Associated album: Boygenius
- Start date: November 4, 2018
- End date: November 30, 2018
- Legs: 1
- No. of shows: 19

Boygenius concert chronology
- Julien Baker and Phoebe Bridgers with Lucy Dacus; Re:SET Concert Series, The Tour

The Julien Baker and Phoebe Bridgers with Lucy Dacus Tour was a co-headlining concert tour with indie rock musicians Julien Baker, Phoebe Bridgers, and Lucy Dacus, collectively known as Boygenius.

== Background ==
In 2016, Phoebe Bridgers opened for Julien Baker on some of her tour. Lucy Dacus also opened for Baker on a handful of tour dates that same year. Being friends with both individuals, this ultimately led to Baker introducing Dacus to Bridgers, and meeting for the first time in 2018. The trio had booked the tour before recording any music. After it had been booked, they originally planned to record one 7", to promote the tour. However, once together in the studio together they ended up recording six songs, which became their self-titled EP. For the tour, each artist performed a solo set of material before all three joined each other at the end to perform the full Boygenius EP.

== Set lists ==
These set lists are representative of the show in Chicago, Illinois on November 13, 2018. They are not representative of all concerts for the duration of the tour.

Boygenius

1. Souvenir
2. Bite the Hand
3. Stay Down
4. Me & My Dog
5. Salt in the Wound
6. Ketchum, ID

Julien Baker

7. Sour Breath
8. Shadowboxing
9. Sprained Ankle
10. Everybody Does
11. Rejoice
12. Televangelist
13. Hurt Less
14. Go Home
15. Something
16. Turn Out the Lights
17. Appointments

Phoebe Bridgers

18. Smoke Signals
19. Funeral
20. Georgia
21. Demi Moore
22. Killer
23. Scott Street
24. Motion Sickness
25. You Missed My Heart

Lucy Dacus

26. Fool's Gold
27. Addictions
28. Nonbeliever
29. Yours & Mine
30. Pillar of Truth
31. I Don't Wanna Be Funny Anymore
32. Night Shift

== Tour dates ==
Date	City	Country	Venue
North America
November 4, 2018	Nashville	United States	Ryman Auditorium
November 6, 2018	Brooklyn	United States	Brooklyn Steel
November 7, 2018	Brooklyn	United States	Brooklyn Steel
November 8, 2018	Boston	United States	Orpheum Theatre
November 10, 2018	Toronto	Canada	Danforth Music Hall
November 11, 2018	Detroit	United States	Majestic Theatre
November 12, 2018	Chicago	United States	Thalia Hall
November 13, 2018	Chicago	United States	Thalia Hall
November 15, 2018	St. Louis	United States	The Pageant
November 16, 2018	Madison	United States	The Sylvee
November 17, 2018	Minneapolis	United States	First Avenue
November 19, 2018	Denver	United States	Ogden Theatre
November 20, 2018	Salt Lake City	United States	The Depot
November 23, 2018	Vancouver	Canada	Commodore Ballroom
November 24, 2018	Seattle	United States	Moore Theatre
November 25, 2018	Portland	United States	Crystal Ballroom
November 27, 2018	Oakland	United States	Fox Theatre
November 29, 2018	San Diego	United States	Observatory North Park
November 30, 2018	Los Angeles	United States	Wiltern Theatre
