= 2019 (EP) =

EP by Lucy Dacus

EP / Compilation album by Lucy Dacus
- Released: November 8, 2019
- Length: 26:22
- Label: Matador
- Producers: Collin Pastore; Jacob Blizard; Lucy Dacus

Lucy Dacus chronology
Historian (2018)	2019 (2019)	Home Video (2021)

Singles from 2019
- 1. "La vie en rose" Released: February 2, 2019; 2. "My Mother & I" Released: April 24, 2019; 3. "Forever Half Mast" Released: June 25, 2019; 4. "Dancing in the Dark" Released: September 12, 2019; 5. "In the Air Tonight" Released: October 8, 2019; 6. "Last Christmas" Released: November 1, 2019; 7. "Fool's Gold" Released: November 9, 2019

2019 is a compilation extended play by American singer-songwriter Lucy Dacus. It was released on November 8, 2019 through Matador Records. The EP is a concept album that compiles seven singles released throughout the year to honor various holidays. 2019 went on to peak at number 22 on the US Billboard Heatseekers Albums chart, making it her first charting album in the country.

== Songs ==
"La vie en rose", originally by Édith Piaf, was released as the EP's first single on February 2, 2019 to celebrate Valentine's Day. "My Mother & I" was released on April 24, 2019 for Mother's Day, and is about Dacus's relationship to her own mother and their similarities as Taurus women. The country-influenced "Forever Half Mast" was released on June 25, 2019 for the Fourth of July and seeks to condemn American exceptionalism and asks listeners "to consider their own complicity in American atrocities" A cover of Bruce Springsteen's "Dancing in the Dark" was released on September 12, 2019 for the artist's birthday, which is also Dacus's father's birthday. "In the Air Tonight", originally by Phil Collins, was released on October 8, 2019 for Halloween, with Dacus calling the song "the best eerie bop of all time". The same day, the album was made available for pre-order and the full tracklist was announced. A punk pop cover of "Last Christmas" by Wham! was released on November 1, 2019 to celebrate Christmas. "Fool's Gold" was released on November 9, 2019 for New Year's Eve, and sees Dacus "alone and anxious in the ruins of the party she threw."

== Critical reception ==
Professional ratings
Aggregate scores
Source	Rating
Metacritic	76/100
Review scores
Source	Rating
AllMusic	3.5/5 stars
DIY	3/5 stars
Paste	8.5/10
Pitchfork	7.6/10

2019 received a score of 76 out of 100 on review aggregate site Metacritic, based on reviews from four critics, indicating "generally favorable reviews". In a review for DIY, Tom Sloman called "My Mother & I" one of the strongest songs of Dacus's career thus far and praised the original songs as a whole, but said that some of the covers miss the mark, specifically "Dancing in the Dark". Marcy Donelson of AllMusic similarly commended "My Mother & I", calling it "spare and both comforting and yearning" and said that the covers "are bound to provide a lasting preferred version (or two) for fans." Peyton Thomas of Pitchfork applauded Dacus's songwriting, saying "She treats her weighty subjects with careful concision: short lines, simple phrasing. These are among the best songs she’s ever written." Thomas also named "Dancing in the Dark" the EP's best cover, and praised it for recontextualizing the original as celebration of lesbian love. Paste writer Clare Martin named "La vie en rose" the best cover, saying "Dacus dives headfirst into romanticism—a rare occasion on an album that tends to regard most special occasions with a winking knowingness—with a persistently plucked guitar that will make your heart race."

== Track listing ==
No.	Title	Writer(s)	Length
1.	"Fool's Gold"	Lucy Dacus	3:18
2.	"La vie en rose"	Édith Piaf; Louiguy; Marguerite Monnot	2:51
3.	"My Mother & I"	Dacus	4:39
4.	"Forever Half Mast"	Dacus	4:02
5.	"Dancing in the Dark"	Bruce Springsteen	3:21
6.	"In the Air Tonight"	Phil Collins	5:29
7.	"Last Christmas"	George Michael	2:42
Total length:			26:22

== Charts ==
Chart (2019)	Peak position
US Heatseekers Albums (Billboard)	22
