= Moveys =

Studio album by Slow Pulp
- Released: October 9, 2020
- Genre: Bubblegrunge
- Length: 26:19
- Language: English
- Label: Winspear
- Producer: Henry Stoehr

Slow Pulp chronology
| Big Day (2019) | Moveys (2020) | Yard (2023) |

Singles from Moveys
- 1. "Idaho" Released: July 8, 2020; 2. "Falling Apart" Released: August 11, 2020; 3. "At It Again" Released: September 10, 2020; 4. "Montana" Released: September 29, 2020

Moveys is the debut studio album by American indie rock band Slow Pulp. It was released by Winspear on October 9, 2020. The album was produced by Henry Stoehr, the band's lead guitarist.

== Background ==
After releasing their third extended play, Big Day (2019), Slow Pulp signed a record deal with Winspear and began touring with Alex G. During the tour, the Chicago-based quartet started working on Moveys. The band created a completed album, but scrapped it and began rewriting it after lead vocalist Emily Massey was diagnosed with Lyme disease and chronic mononucleosis. In March 2020, Massey returned to her hometown, Madison, Wisconsin, after her parents were injured in an automobile crash. Shortly after, the COVID-19 pandemic forced people to go into lockdown; the band was only approximately halfway through completing the album. Although it caused guitarist and producer Henry Stoehr to lose his day job, the pandemic provided the band members more time to work on the album, albeit remotely.

== Touring ==
Because of the COVID-19 pandemic, the band was unable to go on tour around the time of the album's release. Instead, the band's first headliner tour after the release of Moveys was their North America tour, which started on November 4, 2021, in Madison, Wisconsin.

== Critical reception ==
Professional ratings
Aggregate scores
| Source | Rating |
|---|---|
| Metacritic | 74/100 |
Review scores
| Source | Rating |
| AllMusic | 3.5/5 stars |
| Beats Per Minute | 73% |
| God Is in the TV | 9/10 |
| The Line of Best Fit | 8/10 |
| MusicOMH | 3.5/5 stars |
| Paste | 8.1/10 |
| Pitchfork | 6.8/10 |

Moveys received positive reviews from critics. At Metacritic, which assigns a normalized rating out of 100 to reviews from professional publications, the album received an average score of 74, based on six reviews, indicating "generally favorable reviews".

Writing for Paste, Scott Russell praised the band's songwriting and noted that the album has "the confidence of a band who have leaned on each other through trouble and grown stronger for it". Hayley Milross of The Line of Best Fit similarly praised the songwriting and described the album as "weightless – in a sense that the tracks all fall into their natural place".

== Track listing ==
All tracks were written by Alexander Leeds, Emily Massey, Henry Stoehr, and Theodore Mathews.

1. New Horse – 2:00
2. Trade It – 2:52
3. Idaho – 4:05
4. Track – 3:34
5. At It Again – 2:03
6. Channel 2 – 2:25
7. Whispers (In The Outfield) – 1:49
8. Falling Apart – 2:46
9. Montana – 3:20
10. Movey – 1:21
