= I Don't Wanna Be Funny Anymore =

2015 song by Lucy Dacus

Single by Lucy Dacus

from the album No Burden
- Released: 18 November 2015
- Genre: Indie rock
- Songwriter: Lucy Dacus

"I Don't Wanna Be Funny Anymore" is a song by American indie rock singer-songwriter Lucy Dacus, serving as the lead single from her debut album No Burden.

Vice called the song "an exceptionally apt calling card for her songwriting personality, winking yet grounded by some small, sad and unspecified weight she’s carrying." Pittsburgh City Paper called the track "transitional and whip-smart."

== Music video ==
The music video was directed by Hunter Brumfield, and according to Pitchfork, depicts Dacus playing the song in a room with scientists and sculptors from Richmond, Virginia as audience members. They lip sync the track's lyrics in the video. Filming the music video involved 40 cast extras. According to RVA Magazine, the video appears to be inspired by the talk shows of the 1960s. According to Brumfield: "I tried to go for something that was heartfelt, cheerful, and a little campy. Something I’m trying to do as an artist is avoid irony because I’m kind of over that. Ultimately I tried to create something that makes you feel an honest emotion. Lucy is very earnest as a performer and I wanted to capture that.”

== Live performances ==
While performing at the Met Philly in 2025, Dacus played a "midtempo" version of the song.

== Critical reception ==
Rolling Stone named the track the 17th-best song of 2015. The song is considered to be a fan favorite in Dacus' catalogue by WXPN.
