= Yard (album) =

Studio album by Slow Pulp
- Released: September 29, 2023
- Recorded: 2020–2022
- Length: 30:45
- Label: Anti-
- Producer: Henry Stoehr

Slow Pulp chronology
Moveys (2020)	Yard (2023)

Singles from Yard
- 1. "Cramps" Released: February 27, 2023; 2. "Slugs" Released: June 28, 2023; 3. "Doubt" Released: July 25, 2023; 4. "Broadview" Released: August 22, 2023

Yard is the second studio album by American indie rock band Slow Pulp. It was released on September 29, 2023, through Anti-.

== Background ==
Following the release of their 2020 debut Moveys, the band released a B-side-project titled Deleted Scenes and went on to tour as supporting acts for Alvvays. Similar to its predecessor, Yard was recorded at the home studio of band member Emily Massey's father. While still in isolation, Massey described the experience as "very honest" as the exchange would not be the same with a stranger or producer that is not family. About her father, Massey revealed that he already a lot of "context" ready for the songs, as he knows her life "intimately". Working with him was necessarily "direct", leading to the "best things" out of her. The band then came together in February 2022 when Massey was staying with a friend in northern Wisconsin. Bassist Alex Leeds added that "intentionally isolated" time was needed as they "learned a lot about balancing". As a result, the record tackles themes of isolation and the learning process of becoming "comfortable with yourself" as well as learning to love and trust. The sound of the album was labeled as "weepy Americana" with "a raw-to-the-bone piano ballad, and belt-along worthy pop-punk". Following the album's release, Slow Pulp embarked on a tour through North America and Europe in late 2023.

== Singles ==
On February 27, 2023, it was announced that they signed with Anti- and released their first single "Cramps" under the new label. On June 28, Slow Pulp announced the album and released the second single "Slugs". Guitarist and producer Henry Stoehr wrote the song for a crush in sixth grade and talks about falling in love in the summertime. The third single "Doubt" came out on July 25 and reflects on Massey's feelings of self-doubt. "Broadview" was released as the final single on August 22. It was seen as an approach of genres like alt-country and indie folk and deals with the feeling of falling in love "for the first time in a long time".

== Critical reception ==
Professional ratings
Aggregate scores
Source	Rating
Metacritic	77/100
Review scores
Source	Rating
AllMusic	3.5/5 stars
Beats Per Minute	70%
Clash	7/10
Exclaim!	8/10
Mojo	4/5 stars
Pitchfork	7.5/10

Yard was met with "generally favorable" reviews from critics. At Metacritic, which assigns a weighted average rating out of 100 to reviews from mainstream publications, this release received an average score of 77, based on 13 reviews. Editors at Stereogum chose this release for Album of the Week, with critic James Rettig writing that it "embraces the moodier, more muted side of Moveys and is all the more successful because of it" and has "great songs". Rettig stated that while it is "not necessarily a showy album", it has a "gauze and sticky sweetness". Mojo felt that "songs like the Breeders-worthy single 'Doubt' reveal serious song-writing smarts". Recordspin described the album as "reflective, bold, and utterly mesmerizing". Margaret Farrell of Pitchfork wrote that Slow Pulp "solidify their laid-back sound", calling the album "a fine balance of '90s alt-rock grit and melody, with the introspective, detail-driven storytelling of folk music".

== Track listing ==
All tracks are written by Slow Pulp.

Yard track listing
No.	Title	Length
1.	"Gone 2"	2:54
2.	"Doubt"	2:35
3.	"Cramps"	2:53
4.	"Slugs"	3:06
5.	"Yard"	2:48
6.	"Carina Phone 1000"	2:55
7.	"Worm"	2:28
8.	"MUD"	4:06
9.	"Broadview"	4:05
10.	"Fishes"	2:55
Total length:		30:45

== Personnel ==
Slow Pulp

- Alex Leeds – vocals, bass guitar, guitar
- Emily Massey – vocals, bass guitar, guitar
- Teddy Mathews – drums, bass guitar, guitar, percussion
- Henry Stoehr – bass guitar, guitar, keyboards, percussion, piano, production, mixing, engineering

Additional musicians

- Tyler Bussey – banjo (track 1)
- Molly Germer – violin (6)
- William Christianson – banjo, harmonica (9)
- Peter Briggs – pedal steel guitar (9)

Technical

- Greg Obis – mastering
- Michael Massey – engineering
- Sachi DiSerafino – production assistance (4)
