= Boygenius =

American indie rock supergroup

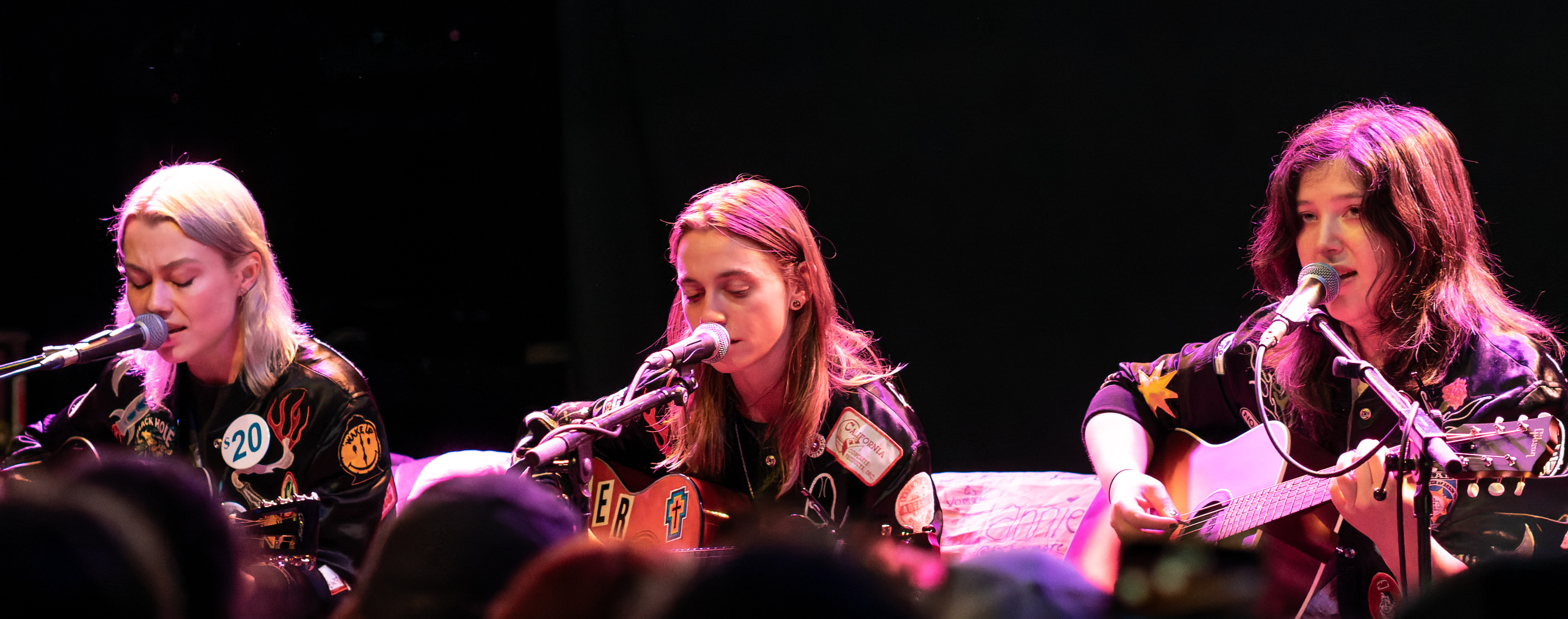
- Boygenius performing in 2023. Left to right: Phoebe Bridgers, Julien Baker, and Lucy Dacus

Background information
- Origin: United States
- Genres: Indie rock; folk rock; indie folk
- Years active: 2018–2024 (Note: The group is on indefinite hiatus.)
- Labels: Matador; Interscope
- Members: Julien Baker; Phoebe Bridgers; Lucy Dacus
- Website: xboygeniusx.com

Boygenius (stylized in all lowercase) is an American indie rock supergroup consisting of American singer-songwriters Julien Baker, Phoebe Bridgers, and Lucy Dacus. They debuted with their self-titled EP in 2018, and then returned after a hiatus with their debut studio album, The Record (2023), which was both a critical and commercial success, winning the members three Grammy Awards and one Brit Award. Labeled an "instant classic" by New Musical Express, it topped the charts in the UK, Ireland and the Netherlands, and peaked at number four on the U.S. Billboard 200. Their second EP, The Rest, was released on October 13, 2023. The group is currently on hiatus.

== History ==
=== 2018: Formation, EP, and tour ===
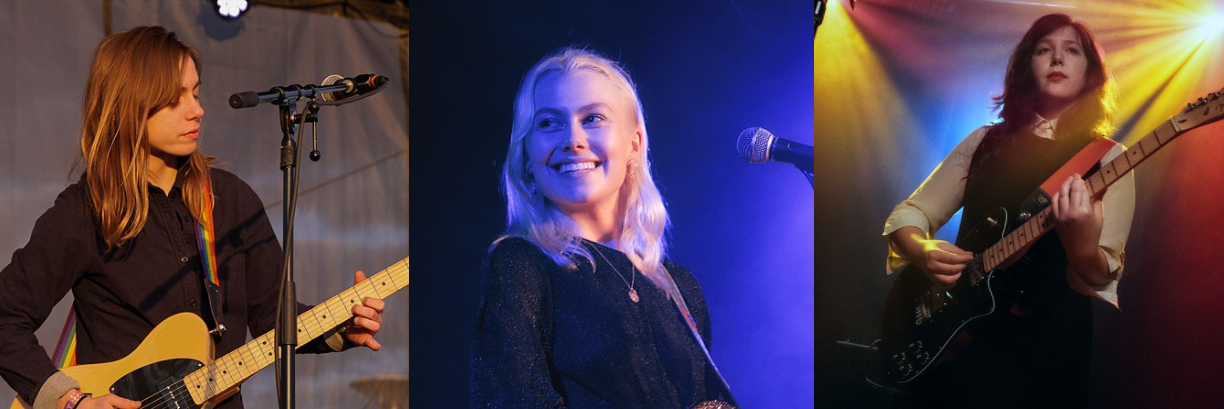
Julien Baker (left, April 2018), Phoebe Bridgers (center, July 2018), and Lucy Dacus (right, October 2019)

Bridgers called the formation of the group "kind of an accident," wherein each of the members were simply fans of each other's work and then became friends. Both Dacus and Bridgers had opened for Baker on separate tours in 2016, and they all ran in similar circles as young up-and-coming performers navigating the indie scene.

The three became close and shared frustrations of constantly being compared to each other as "women in rock" despite their considerably different musical styles. Dacus has commented that the idea of women in music "should not be remarkable whatsoever," with Bridgers adding, "it's not a genre." Each has spoken on the tendency of the music industry to pit women against each other, and the group was formed in part to reject this. "I hope people see the three of us and know there isn't competition," Dacus has said. "You don't have to compete with your contemporaries. You can make something good with people you admire."

Baker had joked to Dacus years before about a "pipe dream" that they could one day all form a band. The three decided to book a co-headlining tour in early 2018, and they originally planned to record a single or cover so that they could perform something together on stage. Upon meeting up that summer, they found themselves overwhelmed with ideas, and they ended up forming the band, writing, recording, and self-producing the Boygenius EP in four days, with the process involving almost exclusively women.

Each brought one full song and one incomplete idea with them to the group. They sought to create an environment free of the competitiveness and "bravado" they had often encountered in previous experiences, and they have remarked that the absence of men in the process proved significant, allowing them to relate to each other openly without constantly having to explain themselves. The record was met with universal acclaim from critics and audiences alike; it was named the 12th best album of 2018 by NPR Music, despite being only an EP. Their subsequent tour that November saw them performing all across the U.S., as well as on Late Night with Seth Meyers and the Tiny Desk.

=== 2019–2021: Continuing collaborations ===
The group was slated to perform in summer 2019 at Woodstock 50, before its cancellation due to a series of production issues. In 2020, they were featured on Hayley Williams' "Roses/Lotus/Violet/Iris" from her EP Petals for Armor II, and also reunited on backing vocals for numerous songs from each other's solo projects: "Graceland Too" and "I Know the End" from Bridgers' Grammy-nominated Punisher, Baker's Little Oblivions single "Favor", and Dacus's "Please Stay" and "Going Going Gone" on Home Video. With the releases scattered throughout the year, all of these were actually recorded on the same day, a process Dacus said "had the same atmosphere as when we recorded the boygenius EP[...] a natural result of being together, easy as can be."

In July 2020, the trio released a handful of demos from their Boygenius recording sessions on Bandcamp to raise money for charitable organizations in their respective hometowns, raising over $23,000 for the Downtown Women's Center of Los Angeles, OUTMemphis, and Mutual Aid Distribution Richmond. After reuniting on stage for occasional surprise appearances at one another's solo tours throughout 2021, the group performed their first full show together since 2018 as the headliner of Bread and Roses Presents' annual benefit concert in San Francisco on November 19, 2021.

=== 2022–2024: Record release, activities, and hiatus ===
In January 2022, Boygenius recorded their debut studio album, The Record, at Shangri-La in Malibu, California. In January 2023, the band announced the album, with a release date of March 31, 2023. The album artwork and three singles from the album, "$20," "Emily I'm Sorry," and "True Blue" were released alongside the album's initial announcement. The three videos from the singles were all directed by Kristen Stewart, and were combined into a single promotional short film called The Film. On January 31, 2023, AEG (Anschutz Entertainment Group) Presents announced that the band would be one of three headline acts at the inaugural Re:SET Concert Series. In April 2023, the group played at the Coachella Music Festival.

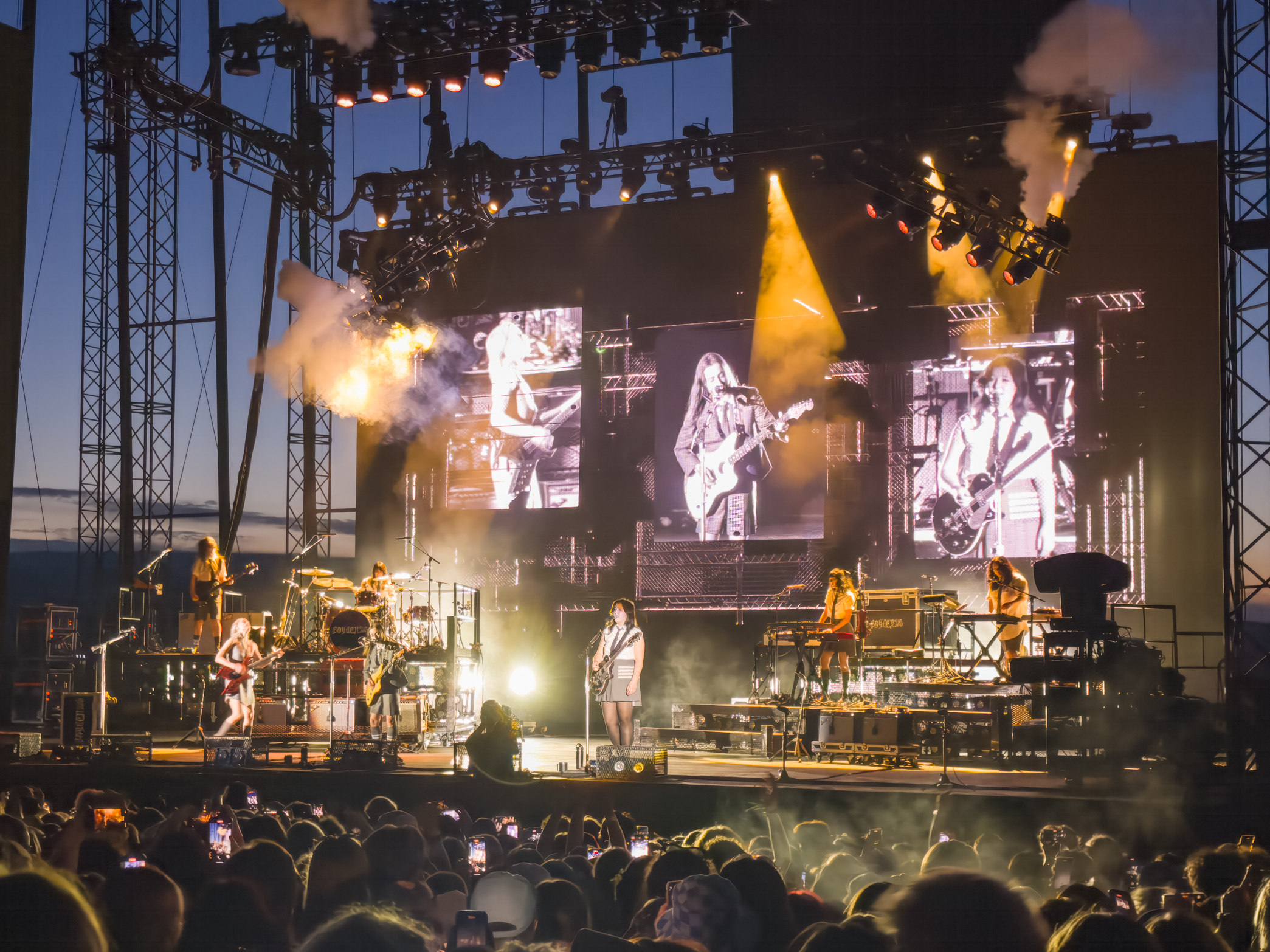
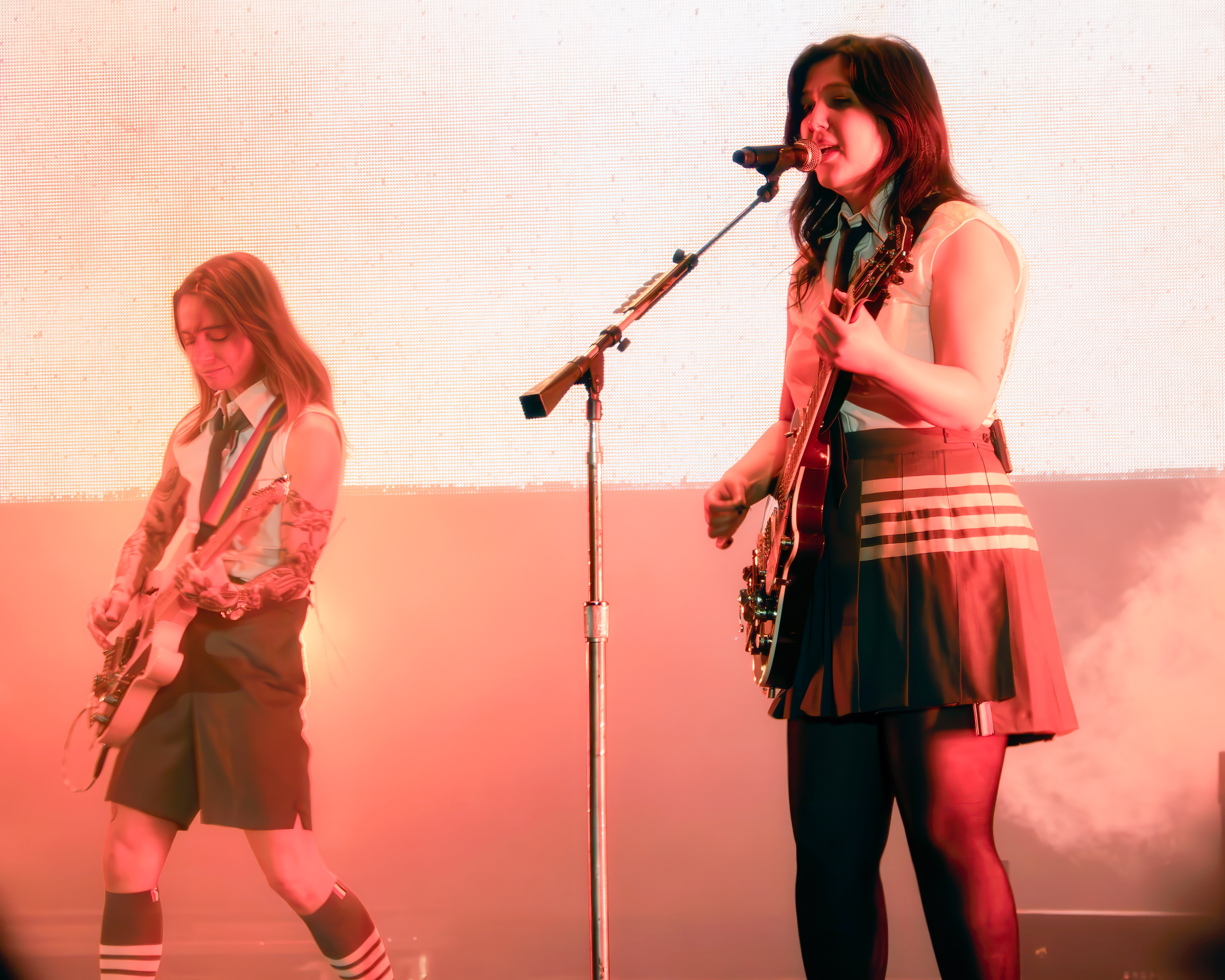
Boygenius performing in July 2023

The band then embarked on an international tour, dubbed The Tour. The tour dates started as early as April 12, and ending on August 27 featuring special guests Carly Rae Jepsen, Bartees Strange, Claud, Broken Social Scene and Illuminati Hotties. The band then later announced an additional 5 tour dates in the fall of 2023. These dates were joined with special guests Palehound, Samia, and Muna. When asked if this tour was the greatest tour the band members have ever been on, Bridgers replied "Yeah... yeah 100 percent" immediately, stating the band only had one bad day on tour.

On September 20, 2023, a music video was released for their song "Cool About It" directed by Lauren Tsai. On October 13, the band released their second EP The Rest, which includes four new songs. On November 11, 2023, the band was the musical guest on Saturday Night Live, performing two songs and appearing in a sketch with Timothée Chalamet. On November 17, 2023, the band collaborated with Ye Vagabonds to release a cover of "The Parting Glass", paying tribute to Sinéad O'Connor, who died on July 26 of that year. All proceeds were donated to the Aisling Project, Sinéad O'Connor Estate's charity of choice. The group received seven nominations at the 66th Annual Grammy Awards, including Album of the Year and Record of the Year, ultimately winning three, including Best Alternative Music Album.

On February 2, 2024, the band announced an indefinite hiatus during a secret show in Los Angeles. They said the hiatus would last "for the foreseeable future." Before the final song of their set, Dacus said, "This is the last song," prompting Baker to reply, "Not ever," clarifying that Dacus was referring to the final song of the concert rather than the band's final performance. At the 66th Annual Grammy Awards, the band was asked what the hiatus meant for their future, with Dacus stating that she was "not convinced" it would be permanent.

== Band name ==
The group has been vocal about the origins of their name, which began as a joke and a way to encourage each other in the studio. All three had shared negative experiences with overconfident male collaborators—as Baker put it, "the archetype of the tortured genius, [a] specifically male artist who has been told since birth that their every thought is not only worthwhile but brilliant." Dacus described the "boy genius" trope as "boys and men we know who've been told that they are geniuses since they could hear, basically," and has detailed how they attempted to channel that energy while making the EP. "If one person was having a thought—'I don't know if this is good, it's probably terrible'—it was like, 'No! Be the boy genius! Your every thought is worthwhile, just spit it out.'"

The group occasionally writes their name as "xboygeniusx", such as on social media and their website. This is a tongue-in-cheek reference to the X symbol of the straight-edge punk subculture, which Baker was somewhat involved in as a teen. She noted that they had all joked about boygenius being a hardcore band, and when creating their social media they thought it would be funny to stylize themselves as extremely punk when it wasn't characteristic of any of their music at the time.

== Influences ==
The band shared a Spotify playlist paying tribute to an assortment of artists that influenced the music on The Record, which included bands and singer-songwriters such as Hop Along, Waxahatchee, Mineral, Fugazi, Joyce Manor, Nada Surf, Wilco, Iron and Wine, Wednesday, Broken Social Scene and Brian Eno.

== Discography ==
Boygenius discography
- Studio albums: 1
- EPs: 2
- Singles: 6
- Music videos: 5

=== Studio albums ===
List of studio albums, with selected details and peak chart positions
Title	Details	Peak chart positions										Certifications
Title	Details	US	AUS	CAN	GER	IRE	NLD	NZ	SWE	SWI	UK	Certifications
The Record	Released: March 31, 2023; Label: Interscope; Format: LP, CD, digital download, streaming	4	3	11	8	1	1	2	36	22	1	BPI: Gold; MC: Gold; RMNZ: Gold

=== Extended plays ===
List of EPs, with selected details and peak chart positions
Title	EP details	Peak chart positions									
Title	EP details	US	US Alt.	US Folk	US Indie	US Rock	GER	NLD Vinyl	SCO	UK Sales	UK Indie
Boygenius	Released: October 26, 2018; Label: Matador; Format: LP, CD, digital download, streaming	— (Note: Boygenius did not enter the US Billboard 200 chart, but peaked at number 3 on the US Heatseekers chart.)	24	—	9	—	—	10	26	85	10
The Rest	Released: October 13, 2023; Label: Interscope; Format: LP, CD, digital download, streaming	50	6	4	—	8	67	—	—	—	—
"—" denotes a recording that did not chart.

=== Singles ===
List of singles, with selected chart positions
Title	Year	Peak chart positions						Certifications	Album
Title	Year	US AAA	US Alt	US Rock	IRE	JPN Over.	NZ Hot	Certifications	Album
"$20"	2023	30	—	44	—	—	—		The Record
"Emily I'm Sorry"	2023	—	25	44	—	—	31		The Record
"True Blue"	2023	—	—	—	—	—	—		The Record
"Not Strong Enough"	2023	1	20	26	78	9	—	BPI: Silver; RMNZ: Gold	The Record
"Cool About It"	2023	2	— (Note: "Cool About It" did not enter the Hot Alternative Songs chart but peaked at number 34 on the Alternative Airplay Chart.)	34	97	–	21	BPI: Silver; MC: Gold; RMNZ: Gold	The Record
"The Parting Glass" (with Ye Vagabonds)	2023	—	— (Note: "The Parting Glass" did not enter the Hot Alternative Songs chart but peaked at number ten on the Alternative Digital Song Sales Chart.)	—	44	—	—		Non-album single
"—" denotes a recording that did not chart.

=== Other charted songs ===
List of other charted songs, with selected chart positions
Title	Year	Peak chart positions		Album
Title	Year	NZ Hot	UK	Album
"Without You Without Them"	2023	39	—	The Record
"Revolution 0"	2023	40	—	The Record
"Letter to an Old Poet"	2023	35	—	The Record
"Black Hole"	2023	18	56	The Rest
"Afraid of Heights"	2023	25	—	The Rest
"Voyager"	2023	28	—	The Rest
"Powers"	2023	34	—	The Rest
"—" denotes a recording that did not chart.

=== Music videos ===
List of music videos
Title	Year	Director(s)
"Not Strong Enough"	2023	Julien Baker, Phoebe Bridgers, and Lucy Dacus
"Emily I'm Sorry" (from The Film)	2023	Kristen Stewart
"$20" (from The Film)	2023	Kristen Stewart
"True Blue" (from The Film)	2023	Kristen Stewart
"Cool About It"	2023	Lauren Tsai

== Accolades ==
Accolades for Boygenius
Year	Association	Nominated Work	Category	Result	Ref.
2023	MTV Video Music Awards	The Film	Best Alternative	Nominated	
2023	MTV Video Music Awards	The Film	Best Art Direction	Nominated	
2024	Grammy Awards	The Record	Album of the Year	Nominated	
2024	Grammy Awards	The Record	Best Alternative Music Album	Won	
2024	Grammy Awards	The Record	Best Engineered Album, Non-Classical	Nominated	
2024	Grammy Awards	"Not Strong Enough"	Record of the Year	Nominated	
2024	Grammy Awards	"Not Strong Enough"	Best Rock Song	Won	
2024	Grammy Awards	"Not Strong Enough"	Best Rock Performance	Won	
2024	Grammy Awards	"Cool About It"	Best Alternative Music Performance	Nominated	
2024	Brit Awards	boygenius	International Group	Won	
2024	iHeartRadio Music Awards	The Record	Alternative Album of the Year	Won	
