= No Burden =

Studio album by Lucy Dacus
- Released: February 26, 2016
- Recorded: January 2015
- Studios: Starstruck (Nashville); The Record Shop (Nashville)
- Genres: Indie rock; indie folk; power pop
- Length: 35:53
- Labels: EggHunt; Matador; Lucky Duck (reissue)
- Producers: Lucy Dacus; Jacob Blizard; Collin Pastore

Lucy Dacus chronology
Girls Back Home (2012)	No Burden (2016)	Historian (2018)

Singles from No Burden
- 1. "I Don't Wanna Be Funny Anymore" Released: November 18, 2015; 2. "Strange Torpedo" Released: January 16, 2016; 3. "No Thank You, I Love You, Goodbye" Released: September 9, 2026

No Burden is the debut studio album by American singer-songwriter Lucy Dacus, released February 26, 2016 by EggHunt Records, then subsequently re-released September 9, 2016 by Matador Records. After the master recording rights reverted to Dacus for the album's 10th anniversary, it was reissued by Lucky Duck Recordings, adding a unreleased song Dacus used to perform live.

== Background and promotion ==
The album's recording was supported by a Kickstarter campaign, which fulfilled its fundraising goal two weeks ahead of the deadline. The album was recorded in one day in Nashville, with a band that had barely learned the songs. It was promoted by the singles “I Don’t Wanna Be Funny Anymore” and “Strange Torpedo”.

== Music and lyrics ==
The fulcrum of the instrumentation on No Burden is Dacus' rhythm guitar playing, which consists of downpicking comparable to that of The Strokes. Corey Henderson of Exclaim! said that Dacus' "smooth, rich voice dances gracefully over the rougher guitar riffs and drums found all over [the album]." The album's music has also drawn comparisons to Sharon Van Etten and Angel Olsen. Jeff Terich of American Songwriter opined that Dacus' voice is "closer to the jazzy pop of someone like Feist than the stream-of-consciousness sing-speak of Courtney Barnett." The album also contains some elements of blues music.

Christopher Laird of PopMatters compared the album to Julien Baker's Sprained Ankle despite their stylistic dissimilarities, likening the listening experience of the two albums to "reading an engulfing book." He described the album's lyrical content: "Dacus essentially takes two approaches here: first, she writes based in reality, often commenting on her and others’ messy journey through life. [...] Second, she writes moody allegories laced with heady imagery. These often start out like the rest, but slowly detour into reveries." Terich said: "Even when the subject matter is fraught with sadness or uncertainty, it’s never delivered in such a way as to set the listener on edge. She’s letting us in on a private conversation, one in which we’re not eavesdropping but a welcome ear." The album' lyrics explore themes such as social roles. Ryan J. Prado of Paste said: "Dacus challenges the little boxes everyone seems forced into at one time or another, exposing them for the weak material they’re built from." According to Taylor Ysteboe of Paste, Dacus occasionally "drops the 'g's' from '-ing' verbs" in the album's lyrics.

== Critical reception ==
Professional ratings
Aggregate scores
Source	Rating
Metacritic	79/100
Review scores
Source	Rating
AllMusic	3.5/5 stars
American Songwriter	3.5/5 stars
Exclaim!	9/10
Paste	8.6/10
Pitchfork	7.8/10
PopMatters	6/10
Spin	8/10

‘No Burden’’ received a score of 79 out of 100 based on 11 reviews from media aggregate site Metacritic, indicating “generally favorable reviews”.

Christopher Laird of PopMatters gave the album a score of 6 out of 10, and wrote: "Lucy Dacus’s new album, No Burden, is exactly the opposite of its namesake. For her, it is a life-changer and an obstruction." Corey Henderson of Exclaim! awarded the album a score of 9 out of 10, and named the opener "I Don't Wanna Be Funny Anymore" as the album's highlight. He closed his review saying: "If Lucy Dacus and peers such as Courtney Barnett and the War On Drugs are the future of rock'n'roll, then it's in good hands." Ryan J. Prado of Paste gave the album a score of 8.6 out of 10, saying: "Motivation to evolve, to shift and to shed old skin ought not to be relegated to the woe-is-me realms of youthful idealism. With No Burden, Lucy Dacus challenges the little boxes everyone seems forced into at one time or another, exposing them for the weak material they’re built from. In the process, she’s created a debut record with an abundance of heart that should speak to anyone with a pulse of their own."

No Burden appeared on several "best of" lists for the year 2016. The album was Magnet’s choice for the best album of 2016, comparing it to the likes of Laura Marling and Erika Wennerstrom. Paste named it the eighth best album of the year. Staff writer Taylor Ysteboe said: "Virginia singer-songwriter Lucy Dacus’s No Burden is astounding for two reasons. First off, this is the young artist’s debut album, but it is surprisingly genuine and mature. Second, she reimagines the indie folk and rock scene because she does not fall victim to the one-dimensional melancholic trope and rather opts for a frank and beautiful style. [...] All the while, No Burden has a tinge of optimism and hope, making it a gorgeous and insightful work." Additionally, Under the Radar named it the 48th best album of 2016.

== Track listing ==
All tracks are written by Lucy Dacus.

No.	Title	Length
1.	"I Don't Wanna Be Funny Anymore"	2:43
2.	"Troublemaker Doppelgänger"	4:22
3.	"Green Eyes, Red Face"	3:39
4.	"Strange Torpedo"	4:24
5.	"Dream State…"	3:31
6.	"Trust"	3:30
7.	"Map On A Wall"	7:28
8.	"Direct Address"	3:20
9.	"... Familiar Place"	2:56
Total length:		35:53

2026 reissue
No.	Title	Length
10.	"No Thank You, I Love You, Goodbye"	3:00
Total length:		36:53

== Personnel ==
- Lucy Dacus – vocals, guitar, production
- Jacob Blizard – guitar, production (all tracks); keyboards (tracks 3, 5)
- Hayden Cotcher – drums
- Christine Moad – bass guitar
- Collin Pastore – production, mixing, recording (all tracks); guitar (track 5), keyboards (7)
- Alan Douches – mastering
