= EggHunt Records =

Egghunt Records
- Founded: 2014
- Founder: Adam Henceroth, Gregory Gendron
- Distributors: Redeye, Clandestine Distribution
- Country of origin: U.S.
- Location: Richmond, Virginia Brooklyn, NY
- Official website: egghunt.music

Egghunt Records is an independent record label based in Richmond, Virginia and Brooklyn, New York. The label was founded by Adam Henceroth and Gregory Gendron in spring of 2014. Egghunt Records focuses on independent artists. It releases material on vinyl, CD & cassette physical formats, as well as digital download and streaming online. Egghunt Records maintains an active roster of artists who have toured with notable acts such as The War on Drugs and Houndmouth. Egghunt Records alumni include Lucy Dacus, whose debut album, No Burden, was released on Egghunt Records in 2016. In 2017, Egghunt Records signed Eric Slick of Dr. Dog to release his solo debut album, Palisades. Other notable releases have included Pearla's Quilting & Other Activities (2019) and Camp Howard's Juice EP (2017). In 2021, Egghunt Records joined the Northern Spy Label Group. In early 2024, Egghunt signed the popular Brooklyn indie pop-art band, Rubblebucket, for their 7th full-length LP release. Egghunt Records has released 64 releases and continues to support up-and-coming indie artists.

== Artists ==
=== Current ===
- TŌTH
- V.V.Lightbody
- Hannah Mohan
- Rubblebucket
- Cuddle Magic
- Banditos
- Primer
- Alyssa Gengos
- Abby Huston
- Lizzie Loveless
- Sara Bug
- Clever Girls
- Suburban Living
- Thin Lear
- Deau Eyes
- Pearla

=== Former ===
- Lucy Dacus
- Eric Slick
- Daddy Issues
- Camp Howard
- Clair Morgan
- Gold Connections
- Grace Vonderkuhn
- Minor Poet
- Molly Drag
- Manatree
- Majjin Boo
- White Laces
- OPIN
- Sun Machines
- Feral Conservatives
- Sun Machines
- Big Baby
- Mekong Xpress
- Dazeases
- Red States
- Doll Baby
- The Diamond Center
- Teagan Johnston
- DIET
- OKO TYGRA
