= Historian (album) =

Studio album by Lucy Dacus
- Released: March 2, 2018
- Studios: Trace Horse Studio (Nashville, Tennessee); The Smoakstack (Nashville, Tennessee); Montrose Studios (Richmond, Virginia)
- Genres: Indie rock; alternative country; rock and roll
- Length: 47:35
- Label: Matador
- Producers: Jacob Blizard; Lucy Dacus; Collin Pastore

Lucy Dacus chronology
| No Burden (2016) | Historian (2018) | Boygenius (2018) |

Singles from Historian
- 1. "Night Shift" Released: December 12, 2017; 2. "Addictions" Released: January 16, 2018; 3. "Next of Kin" Released: February 13, 2018

Historian is the second studio album by American singer-songwriter Lucy Dacus, released on March 2, 2018, through Matador Records.

== Background and recording ==
Historian was produced by Dacus, Jacob Blizard and Collin Pastore, the same team that produced her debut album, No Burden. Dacus and her band recorded the album over the course of a week in March 2017 in Nashville. She described the album as a song cycle about "living through loss and the inevitable darkness of life, and doing so hopefully and joyfully." Of the title of the album, Dacus explained, "It's me having this impulse to document and capture and create a history of my life and the people that I know ... Because as I'm making this history and capturing these things that I hold dear, those things won't stay."

On December 12, 2017, Dacus formally announced the album, alongside the first single from the album "Night Shift". The second single "Addictions" was released on January 16, 2018.

== Music and lyrics ==
The album's music has drawn comparisons to Wilco, specifically the Yankee Hotel Foxtrot era. Lyrical themes explored on the album include death and hope.

== Critical reception ==
Professional ratings
Aggregate scores
| Source | Rating |
|---|---|
| AnyDecentMusic? | 7.8/10 |
| Metacritic | 82/100 |
Review scores
| Source | Rating |
| AllMusic | 3.5/5 stars |
| The A.V. Club | B |
| Chicago Tribune | 4/4 stars |
| DIY | 4/5 stars |
| Mojo | 4/5 stars |
| NME | 4/5 stars |
| Pitchfork | 8.1/10 |
| Q | 3/5 stars |
| Rolling Stone | 4/5 stars |
| Uncut | 8/10 |

Historian was met with "universal acclaim" reviews from critics, many of whom considered it to be an improvement over No Burden. At Metacritic, which assigns a weighted average rating out of 100 to reviews from mainstream publications, this release received an average score of 82 based on 20 reviews. Marcy Donelson of AllMusic said of the release: "Ultimately, the forte passages don't encroach on the songwriting, as they underline emotion, but they do, at times, step on Dacus' voice, when she's clouded by high-volume accompaniment or even vocal processing. Thankfully, those moments are brief and rare, allowing her lyrics and expressive sense of melody to shine." Sasha Geffen of Pitchfork gave the album a score of 8.1 of 10, saying: "Th[e] gradual unfolding is one of Historian’s many delights. It’s not an easy album to wear out. It lasts, and it should, given that so many of its lyrics pick at time, and the way time condenses around deep emotional attachments to other people."

DIY gave the album a score of 8 of 10, and said: "Even as Lucy deals with massive topics including death, hope, and major life transitions, she offers listeners entry points back into their own worlds, all while strengthening her already taut grip on rustling, soul-blemished rock." NME also gave the album this score, and wrote: "The 10-track Historian is far bigger, meatier beast than its predecessor. Recorded in Nashville, this is a rock’n’roll album with deep understanding of pop melody but layered up with bold lyrics which disarm you as much as they connect with you." Rolling Stone also gave the album a score of 8 of 10, saying: "Dacus and her band sound emboldened, confident, like kids who are thrilled they still have something to prove." Paste awarded the album 8.7 out of 10, saying: "At 23, Dacus has already made a career album with Historian, and she’s really only just getting started."

The Chicago Tribune gave the album a perfect score, saying: "As good as No Burden was, Historian is better: songs like short stories; sneakily hard-hitting arrangements; dreaminess and catharsis, often in the space of a few verses." The 405 gave the album a score of 9 out of 10, saying: "Historian is a complete album, cavernous in its emotional depths and regally sophisticated in its songwriting, yet palatably relatable at the point of contact. It’s a work of perfectly realised ambition in which anyone who’s ever waded the swamp of heartache can recognise themselves." Uncut gave the album a score of 8 out of 10, saying Historian "fulfills all the promises" of its predecessor. Mojo also gave the album this score, saying: "Even the less bristling episodes feel luminous and ecstatic, but mostly the magnificent Historian thrives on tension." The A.V. Club gave the album a score of 7.5 out of 10 and wrote: "Historian stumbles occasionally, with some songs taking a while to get up the hill, but it’s rewarding because it carries such weight and commands such attention."

The Line of Best Fit gave the album a score of 9 out of 10, and wrote: "Toning down her wry wit and wrapping her songs around the common theme of reckoning with and rebuilding from loss, Historian offers a more cohesive testament to Dacus’s exceptional songwriting." Drowned in Sound also gave the album a score of 9 of 10, saying: "Historian feels like a universe that exists before time, somewhere to reach up to when you need to express something greater than yourself. And Dacus shows us the way, with grace and patience and the quiet confidence of writers twice her age."

Not all reviews were positive. No Ripcord gave the album a score of 5 out of 10, and wrote: "It’s as though Dacus’s best parts have been filtered through a focus group--just imagine what it could have been with the patina scraped off." Q gave the album a score of 6 of 10, and said: "The only gripe here is that the odd longueur makes Historian solid rather than spectacular." Record Collector also gave the album this score.

=== Accolades ===
Accolades for Historian
| Publication | Accolade | Rank |
|---|---|---|
| Billboard | Top 50 Albums of 2018 – Mid-Year | N/A |
| Consequence of Sound | Top 50 Albums of 2018 | 17 |
| Consequence of Sound | Top 100 Albums of the Decade (2010s) | 55 |
| Noisey | Top 100 Albums of 2018 | 60 |
| NPR Music | Top 50 Albums of 2018 | 4 |
| Paste | Top 50 Albums of 2018 | 1 |
| Paste | Top 100 Albums of the Decade (2010s) | 20 |
| Pitchfork | Top Rock Albums of 2018 | N/A |
| PopMatters | Top 70 Albums of 2018 | 54 |
| Rolling Stone | Top 50 Albums of 2018 | 17 |
| Slate | Best Albums of 2018 | N/A |
| Under the Radar | Top 100 Albums of 2018 | 43 |
| Uproxx | Top 50 Albums of 2018 | 41 |

== Track listing ==
| No. | Title | Length |
|---|---|---|
| 1. | "Night Shift" | 6:31 |
| 2. | "Addictions" | 3:24 |
| 3. | "The Shell" | 4:37 |
| 4. | "Nonbeliever" | 3:40 |
| 5. | "Yours & Mine" | 5:14 |
| 6. | "Body to Flame" | 3:05 |
| 7. | "Timefighter" | 5:48 |
| 8. | "Next of Kin" | 4:06 |
| 9. | "Pillar of Truth" | 7:14 |
| 10. | "Historians" | 3:56 |
| Total length: | | 47:35 |

== Personnel ==
Musicians

- Lucy Dacus – primary artist, vocals, producer
- Jake Finch – drums
- Miles Huffman – drums
- John Hulley – trombone
- Reggie Pace – trombone
- Sam Koff – trumpet
- Steve Cunningham – trumpet
- Ben Plotnick – viola
- John Mailander – violin

Production

- Jacob Blizard – producer
- Collin Pastore – engineer, producer
- Heba Kadry – mastering
- Scottie Prudhoe – engineer
- John Congleton – mixing
- Preston Cochran – engineer
- Adrian Olsen – engineer

== Charts ==
2018 weekly chart performance for Historian
| Chart (2018) | Peak position |
|---|---|
| UK Americana Albums (Official Charts) | 9 |
| UK Independent Albums (Official Charts) | 39 |

2023 weekly chart performance for Historian
| Chart (2023) | Peak position |
|---|---|
| Scottish Albums (Official Charts) | 14 |
| UK Album Sales (OCC) | 45 |
| UK Independent Albums (Official Charts) | 10 |
| US Folk Albums (Billboard) | 12 |
| US Top Album Sales (Billboard) | 20 |
| US Top Tastemaker Albums (Billboard) | 8 |
