= Home Video (album) =

Studio album by Lucy Dacus
- Released: June 25, 2021
- Genres: Indie rock; pop; lo-fi
- Length: 45:36
- Label: Matador
- Producers: Colin Pastore; Jacob Blizard; Jake Finch; Lucy Dacus

Lucy Dacus chronology
2019 (2019)	Home Video (2021)	The Record (2023)

Singles from Home Video
- 1. "Thumbs" Released: March 9, 2021; 2. "Hot & Heavy" Released: April 13, 2021; 3. "VBS" Released: May 19, 2021; 4. "Brando" Released: June 8, 2021; 5. "Going Going Gone" Released: August 7, 2021

Home Video is the third studio album by American singer-songwriter Lucy Dacus. It was released on June 25, 2021, via Matador. It was promoted by the singles "Thumbs", "Hot & Heavy", "VBS", "Brando", and "Going Going Gone". The album received critical acclaim and placed on many critics' year-end lists.

== Background and writing ==
In late February 2021, certain fans of Dacus received a VHS tape of a new song in the mail. On March 9, 2021, the song was released using the title "Thumbs". It had long been a staple of Dacus' live performances prior to its release. Dacus explained the way the song came about in a press release, saying, "Like most songs I write, I wasn't expecting it and it made me feel weird, almost sick." Home video footage is used in the album's music videos, as Dacus "wanted to visualize the moment when you first reflect on your childhood, which I think can also be the moment that childhood is over."

== Promotion ==
Prior to the album's announcement, "Thumbs" was released as the lead single on March 9, 2021. On April 13, 2021, Dacus released the lead single for the album, "Hot & Heavy". The release of "Hot & Heavy" was accompanied by the album's official announcement. Dacus performed the song on The Late Show with Stephen Colbert. On May 19, 2021, Dacus released the album's third single, "VBS". "Brando" was released as the fourth single on June 8, 2021. The song was sent to adult alternative radio on June 14, 2021. Dacus promoted the album with a 28-city tour across North America in 2021. A shortened version of "Going Going Gone" was released as a single on August 7, 2021.

== Music and lyrics ==
Home Video has been described as "very personal" and "more tender and more autobiographical" than some of Dacus' previous releases. Marcy Donelson of AllMusic described the album's material as "vulnerable, touching, and occasionally tinged with regret." The album explores coming of age-related themes. The fourth song "VBS" deals with the topics of faith and attending religious summer camps. In the sixth song "Thumbs", Dacus recounts an instance where she fantasized about murdering her friend's abusive father. Bob Bolien of NPR called the track "a tune I often find too disturbing to listen to." The ninth track "Brando" deals with becoming and being a young adult, "and for Lucy, understanding how others perceive her," according to Bolien.

== Critical reception ==
Professional ratings
Aggregate scores
Source	Rating
Metacritic	85/100
Review scores
Source	Rating
AllMusic	4/5 stars
Clash	8/10
Exclaim!	9/10
Tom Hull – on the Web	B+
NME	4/5 stars
Pitchfork	7.7/10
Rolling Stone	4.5/5 stars
Slant	4.5/5 stars

Home Video was met with widespread critical acclaim. At Metacritic, which assigns a normalized rating out of 100 to reviews from professional publications, the album received an average score of 85, based on 18 reviews.

Reviewing for AllMusic, Marcy Donelson wrote that, "With Dacus' warm vocals and melodies leading the way throughout, Home Video is an engrossing set steeped in life lessons and nostalgia." In Clash, Rebecca Sibley declared it "a powerful album" and "another exquisite offering from Lucy Dacus", while Pitchfork's Peyton Thomas appraised it as "a bold statement, a powerful post-adolescent text in its own right". Exclaim! reviewer Dylan Barnabe claimed that, "Dacus has long been heralded for her ability as a raconteur, and Home Video further cements this reputation. It is a deeply personal album filled with raw vignettes of young adulthood that claw at our collective consciousness." Writing for NME, Rhian Daly believed that, "for the most part, Dacus proves that looking back at your past might make you cringe, but there is beauty and value in those faltering, gawky days." Rolling Stone magazine's Angie Martoccio hailed the album as "her greatest work yet — a cohesive and poignant collection of tales from her teenage years in Richmond, Virginia", with stories "woven like a quilt, with several dark patches reminiscent of her hero Bruce Springsteen's The River". Jeremy Winograd shared similar praise in his review for Slant Magazine, saying that, "Ultimately, it's less the nuances of Dacus's writing than her willingness to expose herself and her past so freely—even the most difficult parts—that make the strongest impression on Home Video."

In June 2021, Home Video was listed as the 15th best album of the year so far by Stereogum and was included on a similar list by Slant.

=== Accolades ===
Critics' rankings for Home Video
Publication	Accolade	Rank	Ref.
Associated Press	AP's Top Albums of 2021	—N/a	
The Guardian	The 50 Best Albums of 2021	48	
The New York Times	Lindsay Zoladz's Best Albums of 2021	9	
NPR	The 50 Best Albums of 2021	3	
Paste	The 50 Best Albums of 2021	28	
Rolling Stone	50 Best Albums of 2021	5	
Uproxx	The Best Albums of 2021	—N/a	

== Track listing ==
All tracks are written by Lucy Dacus.

Home Video track listing
No.	Title	Length
1.	"Hot & Heavy"	4:10
2.	"Christine"	2:33
3.	"First Time"	4:14
4.	"VBS"	3:56
5.	"Cartwheel"	3:24
6.	"Thumbs"	4:25
7.	"Going Going Gone"	3:13
8.	"Partner in Crime"	4:38
9.	"Brando"	3:00
10.	"Please Stay"	4:19
11.	"Triple Dog Dare"	7:44
Total length:		45:36

Japanese edition (bonus track)
No.	Title	Length
12.	"No Scholar" (2014)

== Personnel ==
=== Performers ===
- Lucy Dacus – vocals (all tracks), piano (track 1), electric guitar (3, 9, 11), synthesizer modulation (6); left hand guitar solo, synthesizer (8); Infinite Jets pedal (11)
- Jacob Blizard – bass guitar (tracks 1, 3–5, 8, 9, 11), electric guitar (1, 3, 4, 8, 9, 11), piano (1, 5, 11), synthesizer (1, 6, 8, 9), six-string acoustic guitar (1), acoustic guitar (2, 4, 7, 9), left hand piano (2), bass synthesizer (3, 6, 8), Dream Sequence pedal (3), baritone guitar (4), Mellotron (5, 6); autoharp, classical guitar (5); right hand guitar solo, sequencer, programming (8); synth hi-hats (9); Infinite Jets pedal, pocket piano (11)
- Jake Finch – synthesizer (tracks 1–3, 8–11), piano (1, 2, 10), drums (1, 3, 4, 8–11), high-strung acoustic guitar (1, 9), pitch shifted reverb (2), organ (4), group vocals (7, 11), additional percussion (8, 11); bass synthesizer, Casio drums, iPhone (9); acoustic guitar (10); additional vocals, reverb programming (11)
- Camille Faulkner – violin (tracks 1–3)
- Collin Pastore – pedal steel, pitch shifted reverb (track 2); hi-hat delay (3), "control room assurances" (7), group vocals (11)
- Scottie Prudhoe – synthesizer programming (track 6), "control room assurances" (7), group vocals (11)
- Keilan Creech – acoustic guitar (tracks 7, 10), additional vocals (11)
- Julien Baker – group vocals (track 7), additional vocals (10, 11)
- Phoebe Bridgers – group vocals (track 7), additional vocals (10)
- Dominic Angelella – group vocals (tracks 7, 11); additional vocals, scream (11)
- Harrison Whitford – lead guitar (track 7)
- Liza Anne – group vocals (track 7)
- Drew Baker – group vocals (track 7)
- Beans – group vocals (track 7)
- Patrick Hyland – group vocals (track 7)
- Hadley Kennary – group vocals (track 7)
- Marin Leong – group vocals (track 7)
- Mitski – group vocals (track 7)
- Ali Thibodeau – group vocals (track 7)
- Preston Cochran – group vocals (track 11)
- Mackenzie Werner – group vocals (track 11)

=== Technical ===
- Collin Pastore – production
- Jacob Blizard – production
- Jake Finch – production
- Lucy Dacus – production
- Shawn Everett – mixing
- Bob Ludwig – mastering
- Scottie Prudhoe – engineering
- Preston Cochran – engineering

=== Visuals ===
- Marin Leong – creative direction, art
- Lucy Dacus – creative direction

== Charts ==
Chart performance for Home Video
Chart (2021)	Peak position
Scottish Albums (Official Charts)	6
UK Albums (Official Charts)	85
UK Americana Albums (Official Charts)	2
UK Independent Albums (Official Charts)	8
US Billboard 200	104
US Top Alternative Albums (Billboard)	9
US Americana/Folk Albums (Billboard)	3
US Top Rock Albums (Billboard)	16
US Independent Albums (Billboard)	10
