= Lucy Dacus =

American singer-songwriter (born 1995)

- Dacus performing in 2026
- Born: Lucy Elizabeth Dacus; May 2, 1995 (age 31); Mechanicsville, Virginia, U.S.
- Musical career
- Genres: Indie rock; indie folk; folk rock
- Occupations: Singer-songwriter; musician; record producer
- Instruments: Vocals; guitar; tambourine; synthesizers
- Years active: 2015–present
- Labels: Matador; Geffen
- Member of: Boygenius
- Website: lucydacus.com

Lucy Elizabeth Dacus (/ˈdeɪkəs/ DAY-kəss; born May 2, 1995) is an American singer-songwriter, guitarist, and record producer. Originally from Richmond, Virginia, Dacus first gained fame following the release of her debut album, No Burden (2016), which led to a deal with Matador Records. Historian, her second album, was released in 2018 to critical acclaim. Home Video, her third studio album, was released in 2021. Forever Is a Feeling, her fourth album, was released in 2025.

In addition to her solo work, Dacus is also a member of the indie supergroup Boygenius, with Julien Baker and Phoebe Bridgers. The band has released one studio album and two EPs to critical acclaim and widespread touring. The band won three Grammy Awards in 2024, including Best Alternative Music Album. They also became the first all-female band to win Best Rock Song and Best Rock Performance.

In October 2023, Rolling Stone named Dacus the 213th-greatest guitarist of all time.

== Early life ==
Lucy Elizabeth Dacus was born on May 2, 1995. She was adopted as an infant and grew up in Mechanicsville, Virginia, a suburb of Richmond. She is of Uzbek and Irish descent. Her adoptive mother is a professional pianist and music teacher, and her adoptive father is a graphic designer. Dacus had an early interest in music, and bought her first guitar, a 3/4 scale Ibanez, from Craigslist when she was in middle school. After graduating from Maggie L. Walker Governor's School in 2013, she began studying film at Virginia Commonwealth University, but left to avoid student debt and the "feeling of being misunderstood" in her university program. Prior to becoming a full-time musician, she was employed by Richmond Camera as an editor for children's school photos. During this time, she wrote approximately 30 songs, nine of which would make up the tracklist of No Burden.

== Career ==
=== 2015–2018: No Burden and Historian ===
Dacus first performed in New York City in March 2015. Her first single, "I Don't Wanna Be Funny Anymore", premiered in November 2015. Her debut album No Burden was produced in Nashville by her hometown friends, Berklee College of Music graduate Collin Pastore and Oberlin Conservatory of Music graduate Jacob Blizard; it was recorded at the request of Blizard for a school project. The album was originally released digitally on CD, and on vinyl via Richmond's EggHunt Records on February 26, 2016. Dacus was then signed to Matador Records, who re-released the album on September 9, 2016. In the same year, she performed at Lollapalooza, in Chicago's Grant Park and made her national television debut on CBS This Morning. She recorded a Tiny Desk Concert for NPR the same weekend. In October 2016 she played the London Calling festival in Amsterdam, as a replacement for The Duke Spirit, who had been forced to cancel.

Dacus's second album, titled Historian, was released on March 2, 2018. Like its predecessor, it was met with widespread critical acclaim. Writing for Pitchfork, Sasha Geffen praised its nuance and sensitivity: "It's not an easy album to wear out. It lasts, and it should, given that so many of its lyrics pick at time, and the way time condenses around deep emotional attachments to other people." Rolling Stone rated the album 4/5 stars, as did NME. Historian, like No Burden, was recorded in Nashville, at Trace Horse Studio, in a similar collaborative effort by Lucy Dacus, Jacob Blizard, and Collin Pastore.

=== 2018–2025: Boygenius, 2019 EP, and Home Video ===
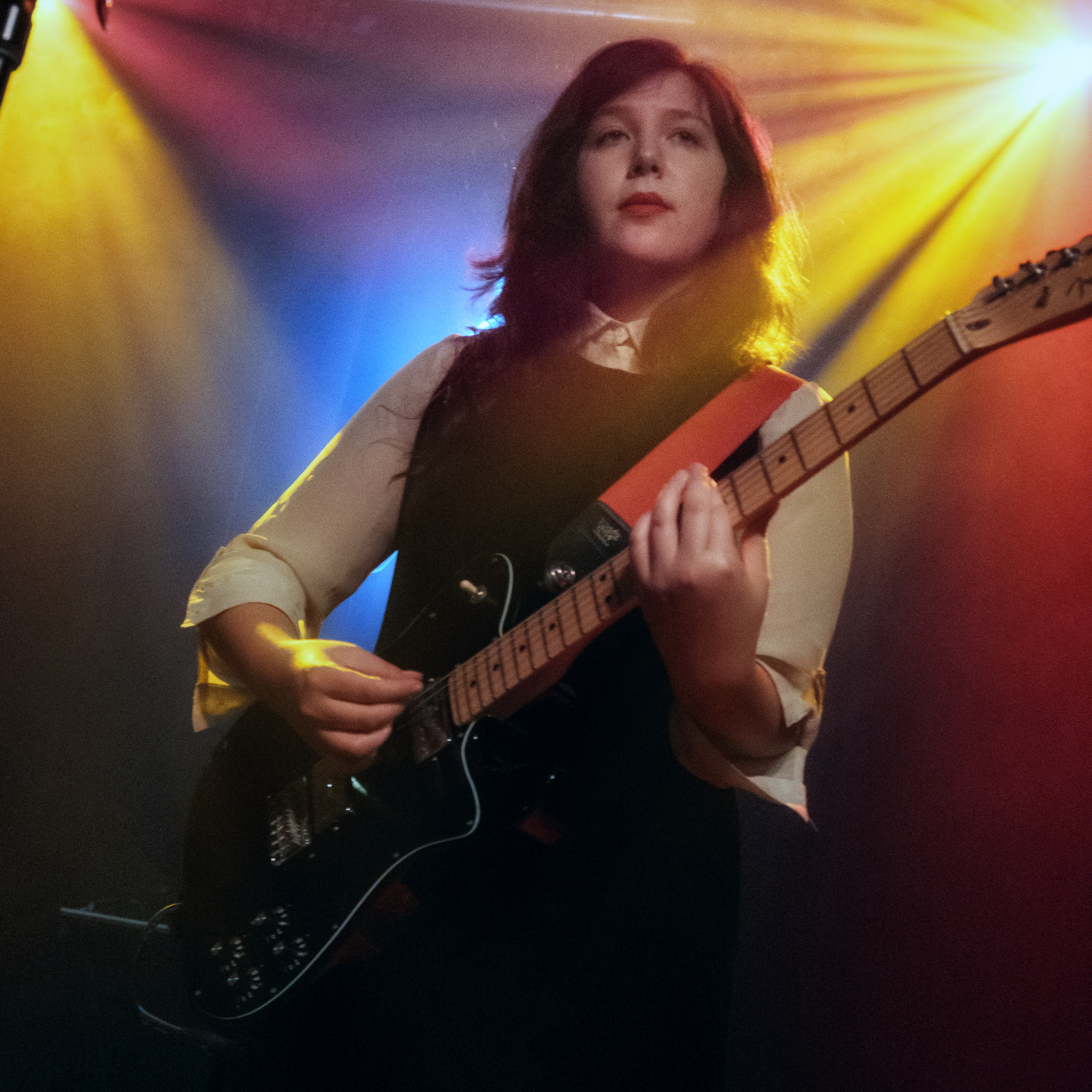
Dacus performing at Neumos in Seattle in 2019

In 2018, Dacus, Phoebe Bridgers, and Julien Baker, formed the supergroup Boygenius. In August, they released three songs from their self-titled debut EP, which was fully released on October 26, 2018.

To coincide with Valentine's Day 2019, Dacus released a cover of Édith Piaf's "La Vie en rose", the first in a planned series of songs commemorating major holidays.

Dacus released her third studio album, Home Video, on June 25, 2021. She performed one of its singles, "Hot & Heavy", on The Late Show with Stephen Colbert on April 13. On November 10, Dacus released her single "Thumbs Again", a re-release of her song "Thumbs" with additional instrumentation, alongside the announcement of 2022 US tour dates.

On February 2, 2022, Dacus released a single "Kissing Lessons", accompanied by a music video. On March 8, 2023, Dacus released a music video for the song "Night Shift", directed by Jane Schoenbrun, for the fifth anniversary of Historian. Boygenius' debut studio album The Record was released on March 31, 2023, and Dacus spent much of the year touring the album with the group, including an appearance at Coachella and on Saturday Night Live. On February 1, 2024, Boygenius announced a hiatus.

On October 8, 2024, Dacus was a surprise opener for a makeup Julien Baker show at New York City's Brooklyn Steel, where she performed an untitled new song, now known as "Best Guess", on International Lesbian Day.

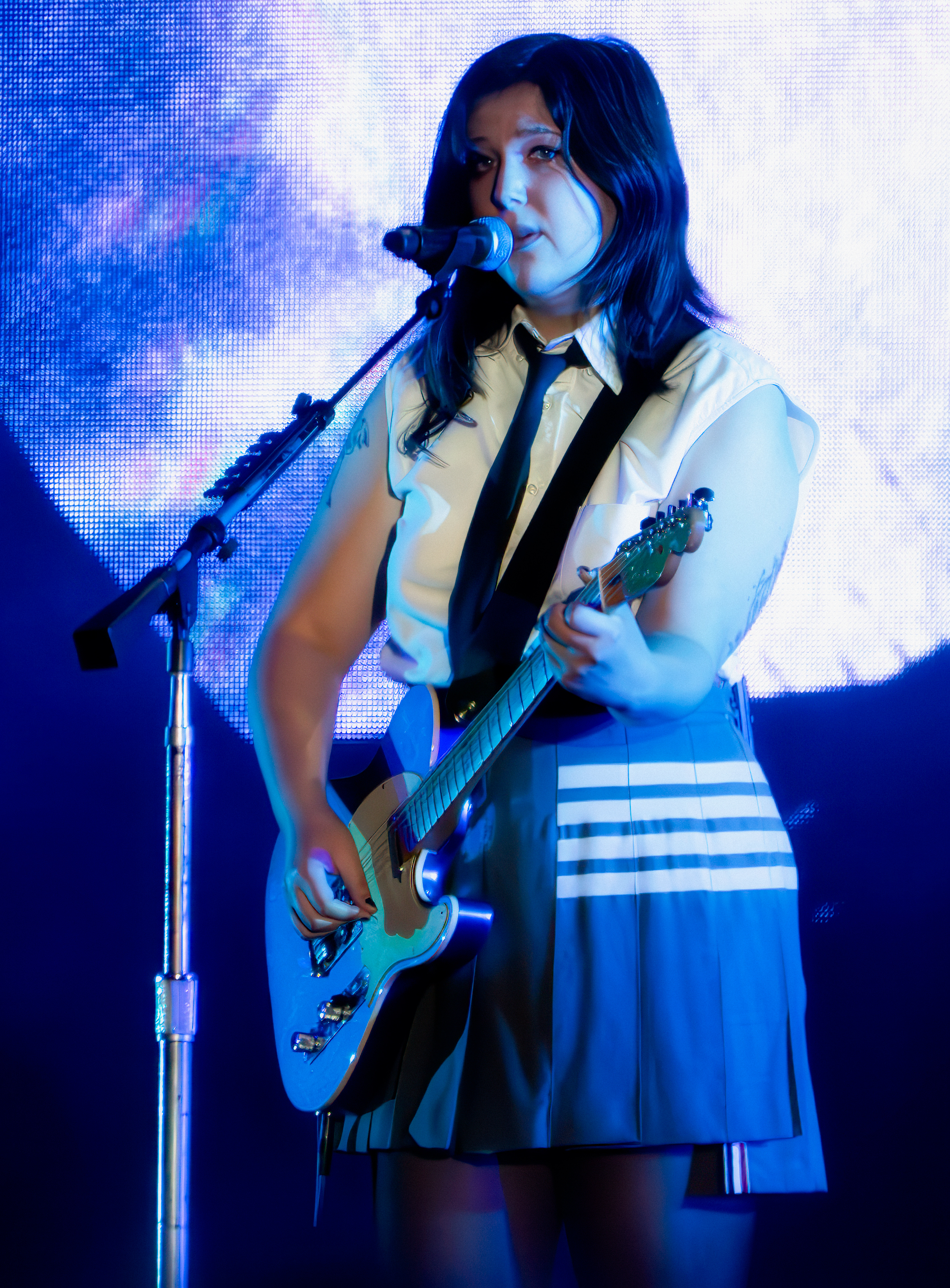
Dacus performing with Boygenius in 2023

=== 2025–present: Forever Is a Feeling ===
On January 15, 2025, Dacus announced her fourth studio album, Forever Is a Feeling. The same day, she released the single "Ankles".

Forever Is a Feeling was released on March 28, 2025. The Guardian's Alexis Petridis gave the album three stars, writing that Dacus "gets lost in understatement on a loved-up album about her relationship with bandmate Julien Baker, shrouding sharp lyrics in shy melodies". Pitchfork's Laura Snapes gave the album a 6.1, writing "Forever Is a Feeling is Dacus' sweetest and most sentimental-sounding album, all but extinguishing the bonfire crackle of her previous records."

On August 8, 2025, she released dual singles "Bus Back to Richmond" and "More Than Friends".

On October 8, 2025, Dacus announced a Forever is a Feeling companion album featuring alternate versions, live recordings, and bonus tracks set to release on October 10. The companion album will have a digital release and a vinyl with two exclusive tracks.

== Artistry ==
=== Musical style and influences ===
Dacus' musical style has been classified as indie rock, indie folk, and folk rock. Although she attempts to avoid being influenced by other singers, she has cited Nina Simone, Barbra Streisand, and Tom Waits as prime sources of inspiration. She has listed Big Thief as among her favorite modern bands.

=== Lyrical themes ===
Themes explored by Dacus in her songs include puppy love and lovesickness. AllMusic said Dacus' lyrics were "playful and also heartrendingly candid." According to Ivy Nelson of Pitchfork, "the people in her songs seem to naturally settle into realms of instability and ambiguity."

Dacus uses her electronic devices to compose and organize lyrical ideas. Regarding her lyrical process and her methodology for drawing inspiration, she told international arts magazine Vice: "Usually I'll just be walking from my house to somewhere else, and melodies and words will start coming up, and I'll have to run home to write it all down. I have a huge note on my phone where things just start popping up. It doesn't make that much sense to me at the time, but once a song is finished, I can read into it and figure out who the characters are in my life. Hopefully when you listen to a song, you can say, 'That's me,' or 'That's someone I know' — you relate to it in a way that's cathartic."

Many of Dacus' songs do not feature refrains, which Dacus attributes to the fact that much of her material is written while "walking around." She has stated she believes her backing band "gets annoyed" with her due to her songs being "pretty through-written."

=== Singing style ===
Dacus is widely recognized for her smooth vocal performances and dark tone, which have been described as "rich [and] buttery" by AllMusic. British culture website NME said her vocals were "steady, expansive and filled with warmth." Paste said her voice was "dark [and] honeyed". According to music website Pitchfork, her vocal style "has a snuggly allure, its tone warm, deep, and decadent."

Rolling Stone described her vocals on her early releases as sounding like a "Southern indie kid with a shy voice." In a review of her debut album No Burden, Pitchfork said her "voice itself is a comforting blur." The New Yorker called her singing voice "calm and limpid," saying that "it makes you wonder whether every other singer has been overdoing it."

She sings in the alto vocal range.

=== Guitar playing style ===
Rolling Stone argued that Dacus' guitar work "is as essential an instrument as her voice". She plays guitar solos. NME described her lead guitar lines as "moody," and noted that some of the material on Historian contains elements of progressive rock and British folk rock. Her attack frequently employs the downstroke technique and eighth notes. She self-compared her style to that of the Ramones. When contrasting her own style with the styles of her Boygenius bandmates, she said: "Julien's just a ripper. [...] Just really beautiful, clean, high-end sounds. And then Phoebe [...] plays really delicately and quietly. And I feel like I'm just kinda clanging along."

Dacus uses open guitar tunings. She told Guitar World that she does this to create "less work" for herself when she plays due to pain she claims to experience in between her knuckles, and because it allows her to maintain chord shapes and move them around the fingerboard more easily. She said: "At first I felt this pressure to get really good at guitar because I was like, 'Oh, I have all this time, and I've been meaning to...' But in truth, like, I don't feel physically good when I play guitar. I don't know what's wrong. [...] But I did a little exploring on the guitar and I feel I've come to really appreciate just how I play. It feels very personal, like, playing in open tunings, figuring out voicings, not really knowing for sure what chords I'm playing, helps me write. I feel like no-one's telling me to get better at guitar, and I don't want to get better at guitar, so I need to drop this weird pressure!"

== Activism ==
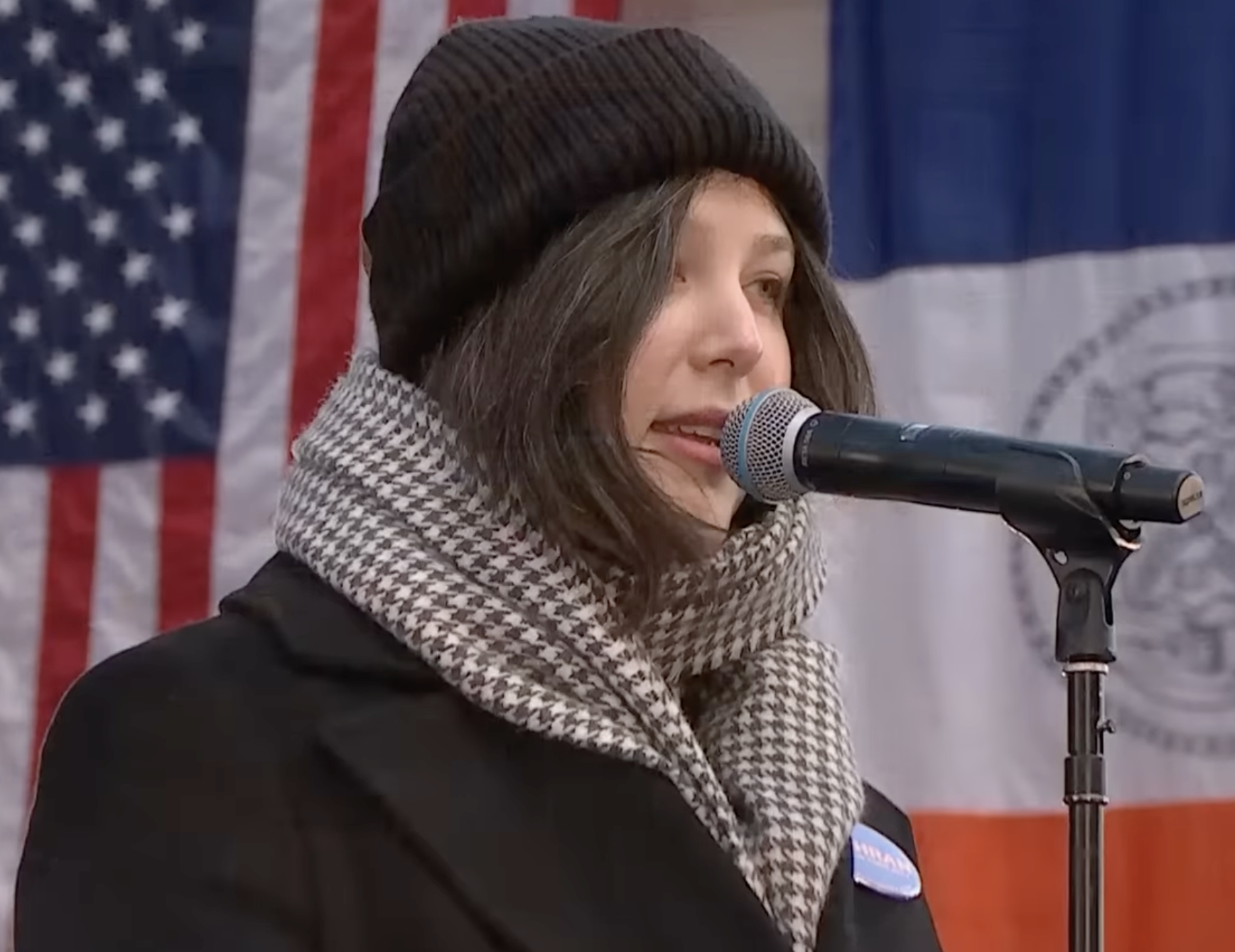
Lucy Dacus singing Bread and Roses at Zohran Mamdani's inauguration

After Texas's new abortion law went into effect on September 1, 2021, Dacus announced on Twitter that all the money she makes at her upcoming shows in Texas "will be going towards abortion funds." She also informed her fans to bring extra money to her Houston and San Antonio shows for the donation to the abortion funds. During her Home Video Tour in July 2022, Dacus announced that she and her supporting act Camp Cope would be donating tips from the merchandise stand to the organization Fund Abortion Not Police.

While performing with Boygenius at Coachella in April 2023, the band spoke in support of trans rights following bills proposed in states like Florida and Missouri. At a later tour date in June 2023 in Tennessee, Dacus and her fellow band members performed in drag in protest of anti-drag legislation that state governor Bill Lee signed into law that was blocked in federal court.

After former President Barack Obama included "Not Strong Enough" by Boygenius on his 2023 annual summer playlist, Dacus quote tweeted him, saying "war criminal :(".

Dacus joined the No Music For Genocide movement, geo-blocking her music from Israel in protest against the Gaza genocide.

At Mayor of New York City Zohran Mamdani's inauguration in 2026, Dacus performed "Bread and Roses".

In September 2026, Dacus attended a protest ahead of a speech by Israeli prime minister Benjamin Netanyahu at the United Nations General Assembly.

== Personal life and views ==
Dacus is queer. Dacus lived in Richmond, Virginia, until late 2019, and Philadelphia until 2023. She currently resides in Los Angeles with her partner, fellow Boygenius bandmate Julien Baker.

Dacus was raised Christian but is no longer religious. She attended a nondenominational Baptist church in her youth. Although she has stated that she still routinely "thinks about God", she has expressed disgust towards religion in politics, and towards what she perceives as religion being used as an excuse to mistreat people. She has stated that she partakes in tarot card reading, which she said "you can take as seriously or as lightly as you want. It's kind of choose your own adventure. It's been a really good way to get to know people too. Being able to know the cards and read for people, I think you get to a level of depth that is hard to come by naturally. It feels religious in a way. I think anything that feels deep feels like it's touching on the core of something that religions are also trying to touch on."

Dacus does not drive automobiles or hold a license due to a nearly-fatal near miss she experienced while en route to Virginia from Tennessee immediately following the No Burden recording sessions. She told Apple Music in 2025 that she lost control of her vehicle on a four-lane highway near a cliff after she slammed on the brakes to avoid being hit by another driver who had botched a merge, which caused the vehicle to spin three times before finally stopping. Dacus said she voluntarily took her hands off the steering wheel "Jesus, Take the Wheel-style" during the spinout. Neither Dacus nor her passenger were injured, and the car did not sustain any damage. Dacus recounted that she immediately called the person she was dating at the time to inform them that she had just "almost died", to which she could hear another girl laughing in the background of the call, leading her to realize she was being cheated on.

Dacus has been openly critical of capitalism. Speaking to Guitar World in 2021 about the effects of the stay-at-home orders during the COVID-19 lockdowns on working people, she said: "I think it's very healthy to rebel against the churning wheel of productivity. I think that's a sickness, that we have to always be productive. I feel like capitalism just enters every part of our lives without us noticing. Just this feeling like you don't have worth unless you're being a worker. It's just such a lie. So I hope that, you know, some people really got to realize that, not working, they were still a person."

== Discography ==
Lucy Dacus discography
- Studio albums: 4
- EPs: 3
- Singles: 21
- Music videos: 8

=== Studio albums ===
Title	Album details	Peak chart positions									
Title	Album details	US	AUT	AUS	CAN	GER	IRE	NLD	NZ	SCO	UK
No Burden	Released: February 26, 2016; Label: EggHunt, Matador; Format: LP, CD, digital download, streaming media	—	—	—	—	—	―	―	―	―	―
Historian	Released: March 2, 2018; Label: Matador; Format: LP, CD, digital download, streaming	— (Note: Historian did not enter the Billboard 200 but did peak at number 20 on the Top Album Sales chart.)	—	―	—	—	―	―	―	14	― (Note: Historian did not enter the UK Albums Chart but peaked at number 45 on the UK Album Sales chart.)
Home Video	Released: June 25, 2021; Label: Matador; Format: LP, CD, digital download, streaming	104	―	―	―	―	—	―	―	6	85
Forever Is a Feeling	Released: March 28, 2025; Label: Geffen; Format: LP, CD, digital download, streaming	16	23	49	84	21	20	15	14	4	5
"—" denotes a recording that did not chart or was not released in that territory.

=== Extended plays ===
Title	EP details	Peak chart positions
Title	EP details	US Heat
Girls Back Home	Released: August 31, 2012; Label: Independent; Format: Digital download	―
Lucy Dacus on Audiotree Live	Released: April 20, 2016; Label: Audiotree Music; Format: Digital download, streaming	―
2019	Released: November 8, 2019; Label: Matador; Format: Vinyl, digital download, streaming	22
Spotify Singles	Released: July 20, 2022; Label: Matador; Format: streaming	—

=== Singles ===
Title	Year	Peak chart positions						Certifications	Album
Title	Year	US AAA	US Rock	US Rock Air.	MEX Air.	NZ Hot	UK Sales	Certifications	Album
"I Don't Wanna Be Funny Anymore"	2015	—	—	—	—	—	—		No Burden
"Strange Torpedo"	2016	—	—	—	—	—	—		No Burden
"Night Shift"	2017	—	—	—	—	—	—	RIAA: Gold	Historian
"Addictions"	2018	—	—	—	48	—	—		Historian
"Next of Kin"	2018	—	—	—	—	—	—		Historian
"La Vie en rose"	2019	—	—	—	—	—	—		2019
"My Mother & I"	2019	—	—	—	—	—	—		2019
"Forever Half Mast"	2019	—	—	—	—	—	—		2019
"Dancing in the Dark"	2019	—	—	—	—	—	—		2019
"In the Air Tonight"	2019	—	—	—	—	—	—		2019
"Last Christmas"	2019	—	—	—	—	—	—		2019
"Fool's Gold"	2019	—	—	—	—	—	—		2019
"Isabella" (with Hamilton Leithauser)	2020	—	—	—	—	—	—		Non-album single
"Thumbs"	2021	—	—	—	—	—	— (Note: "Thumbs" did not enter the UK Singles Chart but peaked at number eight on the UK Physical Singles chart.)		Home Video
"Hot & Heavy"	2021	24	—	—	—	—	—		Home Video
"VBS"	2021	—	—	—	—	—	—		Home Video
"Brando"	2021	13	—	—	—	—	—		Home Video
"Going Going Gone"	2021	—	—	—	—	—	—		Home Video
"Thumbs Again"	2021	—	—	—	—	—	—		Non-album singles
"Kissing Lessons"	2022	20	—	50	—	—	—		Non-album singles
"Home Again" / "It's Too Late"	2022	—	—	—	—	—	—		Non-album singles
"Ankles" / "Limerence"	2025	4	47	37	—	34	—		Forever Is a Feeling
"Ankles" / "Limerence"	2025	—	—	—	—	—	—		Forever Is a Feeling
"Best Guess"	2025	18	—	—	—	—	—		Forever Is a Feeling
"Talk"	2025	—	—	—	—	—	—		Forever Is a Feeling
"Bus Back to Richmond" / "More Than Friends"	2025	—	—	—	—	—	— (Note: "Bus Back to Richmond" did not enter the UK Singles Chart but peaked at number 22 on the UK Physical Singles chart.)		Forever Is a Feeling: The Archives
"Bus Back to Richmond" / "More Than Friends"	2025	—	—	—	—	—	—		Forever Is a Feeling: The Archives
"Planting Tomatoes"	2026	6	—	40	—	—	25		TBA
"—" denotes a recording that did not chart or was not released in that territory.

=== Other charted songs ===
Title	Year	Peak chart positions		Album
Title	Year	US Rock	NZ Hot	Album
"Bullseye" (with Hozier)	2025	35	14	Forever Is a Feeling

=== Other appearances ===
Year	Song	Album	Notes
2020	"Lips of an Angel"	Save Stereogum: An '00s Covers Comp	Hinder cover

=== Music videos ===
Title	Year	Director
"I Don't Wanna Be Funny Anymore"	2016	Joseph McCormick & Henry Sho Kellam
"Addictions"	2018	Lucy Dacus
"Hot & Heavy"	2021	Lucy Dacus & Marin Leong
"VBS"	2021	Marin Leong
"Going Going Gone" (Live at Spang)	2021	Jordan Rodericks
"Brando"	2021	Unknown
"Kissing Lessons"	2022	Mara Palena
"Night Shift"	2023	Jane Schoenbrun
"Ankles"	2025	M. Amberson
"Best Guess"	2025	Lucy Dacus
"Planting Tomatoes"	2026	Lucy Dacus

=== Guest appearances ===
Title	Year	Other artists	Album
"Isabella"	2020	Hamilton Leithauser	The Loves of Your Life
"Roses/Lotus/Violet/Iris"	2020	Hayley Williams	Petals for Armor
"Graceland Too"	2020	Phoebe Bridgers	Punisher
"I Know the End"	2020	Phoebe Bridgers	Punisher
"Lose This Number"	2020	Christian Lee Hutson	Beginners
"Unforgivable"	2020	Christian Lee Hutson	Beginners
"Get the Old Band Back Together"	2020	Christian Lee Hutson	Beginners
"Single for the Summer"	2020	Christian Lee Hutson	Beginners
"Favor"	2021	Julien Baker	Little Oblivions
"Broken Chair	2026	Rachel Chinouriri	I Think I Spoke Too Soon

=== As part of Boygenius ===
- Boygenius (2018)
- Boygenius (Demos) (2020)
- The Record (2023)
- The Rest (2023)

== Tours ==
- 2016 Tour (2016)
- 2017 Tour (with Hamilton Leithauser) (2017)
- Historian Tour (2018)
- North American Summer 2018 Tour (2018)
- Julien Baker and Phoebe Bridgers with Lucy Dacus Tour (2018)
- 2019 Tour (2019)
- Fall Tour 2019 (2019)
- Spring UK/EU Tour (2020; suspended after 2 dates)
- 2021 North American Tour (2021)
- Winter Tour 2022 (2022)
- UK/EU 2022 (2022)
- Summer Tour 2022 (2022)
- Home Video Tour (2022)
- Re:SET Concert Series (2023)
- The Tour (2023)
- Forever is a Feeling Tour North America (2025)
- Forever is a Feeling Tour UK/EU (2025)

=== Supporting ===
- Billie Eilish - Hit Me Hard and Soft: The Tour (2025)

== Accolades ==
Year	Association	Category	Nominated work	Result	Ref
2019	Libera Awards	Best Breakthrough Artist/Release	Historian	Nominated	
2022	GLAAD Media Award	Outstanding Breakthrough Music Artist	Home Video	Nominated	
2024	Grammy Awards (Note: Nominated as a member of boygenius.)	Album of the Year	the record	Nominated	
2024	Grammy Awards	Best Alternative Music Album	the record	Won	
2024	Grammy Awards	Record of the Year	"Not Strong Enough"	Nominated	
2024	Grammy Awards	Best Rock Song	"Not Strong Enough"	Won	
2024	Grammy Awards	Best Rock Performance	"Not Strong Enough"	Won	
2024	Grammy Awards	Best Alternative Music Performance	"Cool About It"	Nominated	
2024	Brit Awards	International Group	boygenius	Won	
