= Adrian Utley =

British guitarist

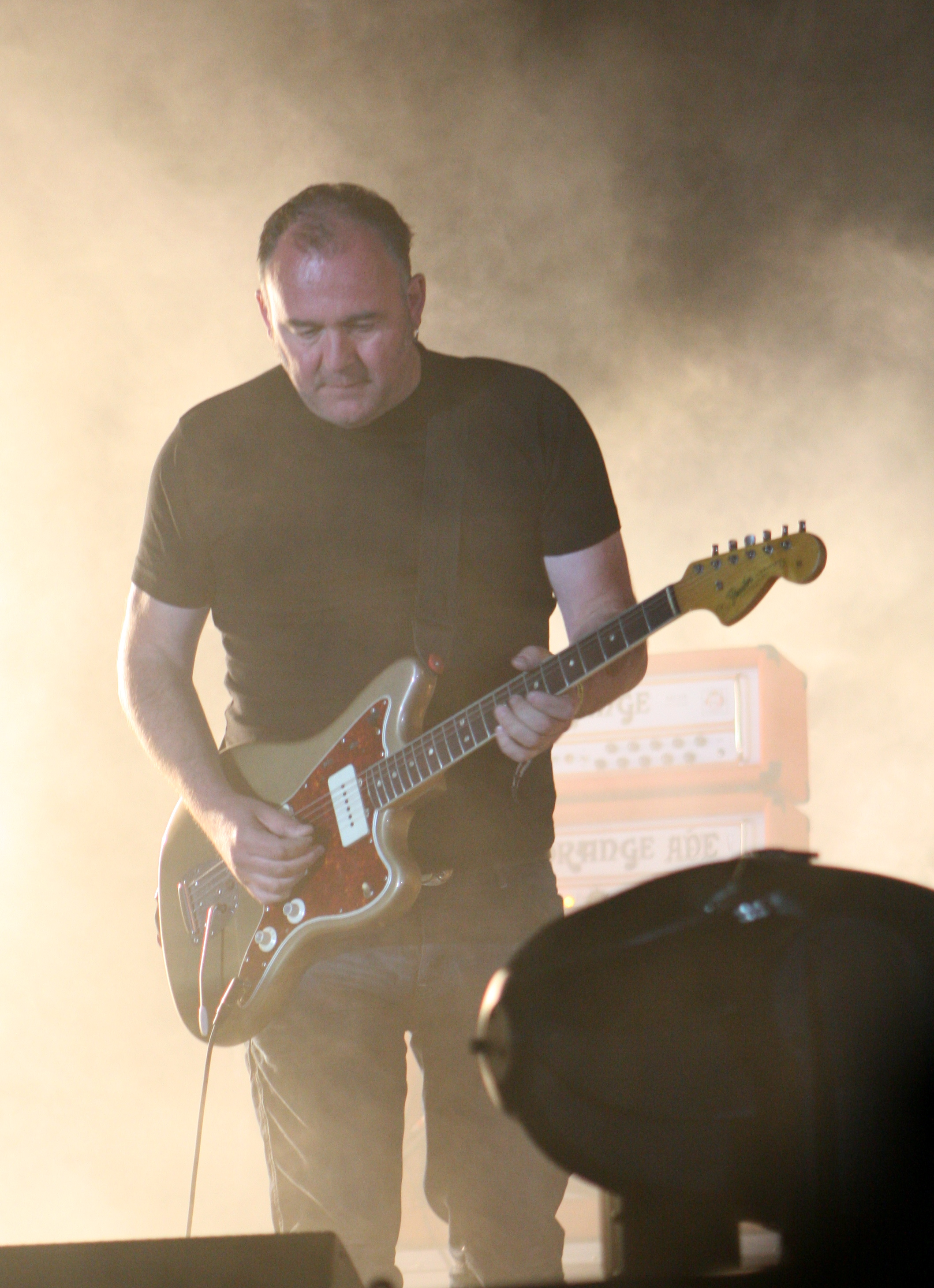

Background information
- Born: Adrian Francis Utley; 27 April 1957 (age 69); Northampton, England
- Genres: Electronic; trip hop
- Instruments: Guitar; bass; keyboards
- Member of: Portishead

Adrian Francis Utley (born 27 April 1957) is an English musician, record producer, and a member of the band Portishead.

== Career ==
Born in Northampton, Utley moved to Bristol in the mid 1980s, and heavily into jazz, played guitar with Big John Patton's touring band and Art Blakey's Jazz Messengers. He built up a collection of vintage instruments and studio equipment, and moved into production and film work.

Portishead formed in 1990 with the first album Dummy released in 1994 followed by Portishead in 1997. Third was released in April 2008. During Portishead's hiatus between the second and third albums, Utley's production work included Beth Gibbons and Rustin' Man's Out of Season and he worked with fellow Portishead member Geoff Barrow as the Jimi Entley Sound and Fuzzface.

During his career, Utley has recorded with artists as diverse as Jeff Beck, Torres, Perfume Genius, Alain Bashung and Marianne Faithfull, and his film work includes Sound by Nic Roeg and Spiders from Mars with David Attenborough.

In 2009, he was part of the jazz collective Stonephace, releasing a self-titled album. In 2010, he composed a new soundtrack for silent film The Passion of Joan of Arc with Will Gregory (of Goldfrapp), performed by a 23 piece orchestra conducted by Charles Hazlewood. In 2012, he was commissioned by the National Trust to produce "Sonic Journey," a piece of music inspired by walking among the trees at Croft Castle. In 2013, he performed Terry Riley's "In C" with an ensemble including a bass clarinet, four organs (played by Hazlewood), and 19 guitars (including John Parish), the performance released on CD later that year.

In April 2018 he featured in an episode of series 45 of the BBC Radio 4 programme Great Lives, speaking in praise of Miles Davis.

In October 2026 he led a guitar orchestra at the PEOPLE festival in Berlin, and was a prominent collaborator at the week-long residency developed by Bon Iver, and Aaron and Bryce Dessner.

== Credits ==
Year	Album	Artist	Details	Ref.
1988	Rust	Kevin Brown	Arranger, guitar	
1993	Crazy Legs	Jeff Beck	Rhythm guitar	
1994	Dummy	Portishead	As band member Producer, composer, guitar, bass, Hammond organ, string arrangements, mixing	
1995	Zanzibar	Flanagan-Ingham Quartet	Producer	
1997	Portishead	Portishead	As band member Producer, composer, guitar, bass, keyboards, synthesizer, theremin, string and horn arrangements, mixing	
1998	Fantaisie militaire	Alain Bashung	Electric guitars	
1998	Roseland NYC Live	Portishead	As band member Producer, composer, guitar, synthesizer, cabasa, orchestral arrangements	
1999	Ultra-Obscene	Breakbeat Era	Guitar on "Late Morning"	
1999	Reload	Tom Jones	Producer, guitars, bass on "Motherless Child" (with Portishead)	
1999	Warminster	Himself with Mount Vernon Arts Lab	Producer, instrumentation	
2000	Textile Lunch	Flanagan-Ingham Quartet	Producer	
2000	Felt Mountain	Goldfrapp	Bass, synthesiser	
2000	American Psycho: Music from the Controversial Motion Picture	Various artists	Producer on "Trouble" by Daniel Ash	
2001	It's a Wonderful Life	Sparklehorse	Bass, guitar, Dictaphone	
2002	Out of Season	Beth Gibbons & Rustin Man	Producer, guitars, bass, keyboards, synthesizers, engineering	
2002	Shaken and Stirred: The David Arnold James Bond Project	David Arnold	Guitar on "The James Bond Theme" featuring LTJ Bukem	
2002	Hometime	Alison Moyet	Guitar on two tracks	
2002	Len Parrot's Memorial Lift	Baxter Dury	Co-composer of "Gingham Smalls 2", guitar, bass	
2002	How Animals Move	John Parish	Guitar, Dictaphone	
2003	Black Cherry	Goldfrapp	Guitar, bass on "Train"	
2003	The Golden Age of Grotesque	Marilyn Manson	Bass on "This Is the New Shit" (Goldfrapp Remix)	
2003	Amorino	Isobel Campbell	Synthesizer on "This Land Flows With Milk"	
2003	McKay	Stephanie McKay	Guitar, synthesizer	
2003	Manipulating Agent	Katalyst	Guitar	
2004	Blottie	Hurleurs	Guitar, bass, melodica, clavinet	
2005	The Invisible Invasion	The Coral	Producer, engineering, mixing (with Geoff Barrow)	
2005	Before the Poison	Marianne Faithfull	Guitars, bass, keyboards, synthesizers, piano, sampling	
2005	Once Upon a Little Time	John Parish	Guitars	
2005	Delirious / Theatre Of Dreams	Marc Almond	Guitar on "Delirious (Demented, Deluded, Delirious)"	
2005	Luxury Problems	Patrick Duff	Producer, bass, engineering	
2006	Supernature	Goldfrapp	Guitar on "Ooh La La", guitar & bass on "Satin Chic"	
2006	Monsieur Gainsbourg Revisited	Various artists	Performance and engineering on "Requiem for Anna" (with Portishead)	
2008	Seventh Tree	Goldfrapp	Bass guitars on "Caravan Girl"	
2008	Bugs in Amber	Get the Blessing	Electric guitar	
2008	Third	Portishead	As band member Producer, composer, guitars, bass, keyboards, synthesizers, ukulele, programming, engineering	
2009	Stonephace	Stonephace	As band member: electric guitar	
2009	Bugs in Amber	Get the Blessing	Guitar, synthesizer	
2010	Heligoland	Massive Attack	Guitar	
2011	Street Clan	Invisible System	Guitar	
2011	Happy Soup	Baxter Dury	Guitars	
2012	The Haunted Man	Bat for Lashes	Guitar, additional synths on "Horses of the Sun"	
2012	The Pond	The Pond	Mixing	
2012	OC DC	Get the Blessing	Guitar	
2013	In C	Adrian Utley's Guitar Orchestra	Guitar, mixing	
2013	The Vapourer	Spiro	Mixing, producer, Moog	
2014	Too Bright	Perfume Genius	Producer, guitar, bass, synthesizers, handclaps, engineering, mixing	
2014	Lope and Antilope	Get the Blessing	Guitar, synthesizers	
2014	Ostinato	Versari	Producer, guitar, synthesizers, piano, engineering	
2014	Give My Love to London	Marianne Faithfull	Guitar	
2014	Subterranean: New Designs on Bowie's Berlin	Dylan Howe	Guitar, introduction	
2014	Crows' Bones	Martin Green	Guitar, bass, keyboard, percussion, mixing	
2015	Sprinter	Torres	Guitar, synthesizer, temple block	
2016	Zoo	Françoiz Breut	Producer, instrumentation, mixing	
2016	Sirens	Joe Volk	Guitar on "Sirens", engineering	
2017	Three Futures	Torres	Synthesizer	
2017	The Underside of Power	Algiers	Producer, guitar, synthesizers, drum machine	
2017	Zone on Nine	BONZIE	Guitar, bass, synthesizer, Swarmandal	
2018	Hunter	Anna Calvi	Synthesizers, keyboards	
2018	Arcadia (Music From The Motion Picture)	Himself & Will Gregory	Guitar, synthesizers	
2020	Earth	EOB	Guitar	
2020	Straight Songs of Sorrow	Mark Lanegan	Guitar, synthesizers	
2021	Planet (i)	Squirrel Flower	Guitar, synthesizers, sitar	
2021	Thirstier	Torres	Synthesizer	
2022	Anywhere But Here	Sorry	Producer	
2022	No End In Sight	Himself & Luke Reynolds	Extended play	
2023	Strange Dance	Philip Selway	Guitar, bass, synthesizer	
2025	Pink Silence	Cloth	Guitar, synthesizer	
2026	The Ground Above	Beth Orton	Electric guitar, acoustic guitar	
