= Playgroup Festival =

- Status: Dormant
- Genre: Arts festival
- Frequency: Annual (August)
- Locations: Eridge Park, England
- Years active: 4 years
- Inaugurated: 2010
- Founder: Playgroup
- Most recent: 2013
- Next event: Unknown
- Attendance: 1,500–4,500
- Organiser: Playgroup Festivals

Playgroup Festival is a festival of contemporary performing arts that has taken place in both Kent and East Sussex in England.

In addition to contemporary music, the festival has hosted comedy, cabaret and other arts and activities.

Regarded as a minor event in British culture, the festival is inspired by the creative output of Sussex and Kent, especially the City of Brighton & Hove. The organising production company, most of the performing artists and the festival crew are all based in the City. In the first four years, a majority of the attendees came from London and Brighton.

The festival has been both reviewed and awarded accolades as one of the best small festivals in the UK.

== 2010 Playgroup Festival ==
=== Performers ===
Performers included: Los Albertos.

=== Theme ===
Children's Books.

== 2011 Playgroup Festival ==
=== Performers ===
Performers included: Quantic and his Combo Bárbaro, Alice Russell (singer), High Rankin, Gypsy Hill, Los Albertos, The Correspondents, June Deer, Kid Kanevil, AK/DK, Boss Kite.

=== Theme ===
Woodland Animals.

== 2012 Playgroup Festival ==
=== Performers ===
Performers included: DJ Yoda, Alice Russell (singer), The Herbaliser, Carnival Collective, Resonators, AK/DK, Kovak (band), Reso, Transformer, The Correspondents.

=== Theme ===
Lost Toys.

== 2013 Playgroup Festival ==
=== Performers ===
Performers included: Adam Freeland.

=== Theme ===
Explorers.

== Future Events ==
None are currently planned.
