= Trowbridge Village Pump Festival =

Folk music festival in England

Coordinates: 51.317796°N 2.272950°W

Trowbridge Festival
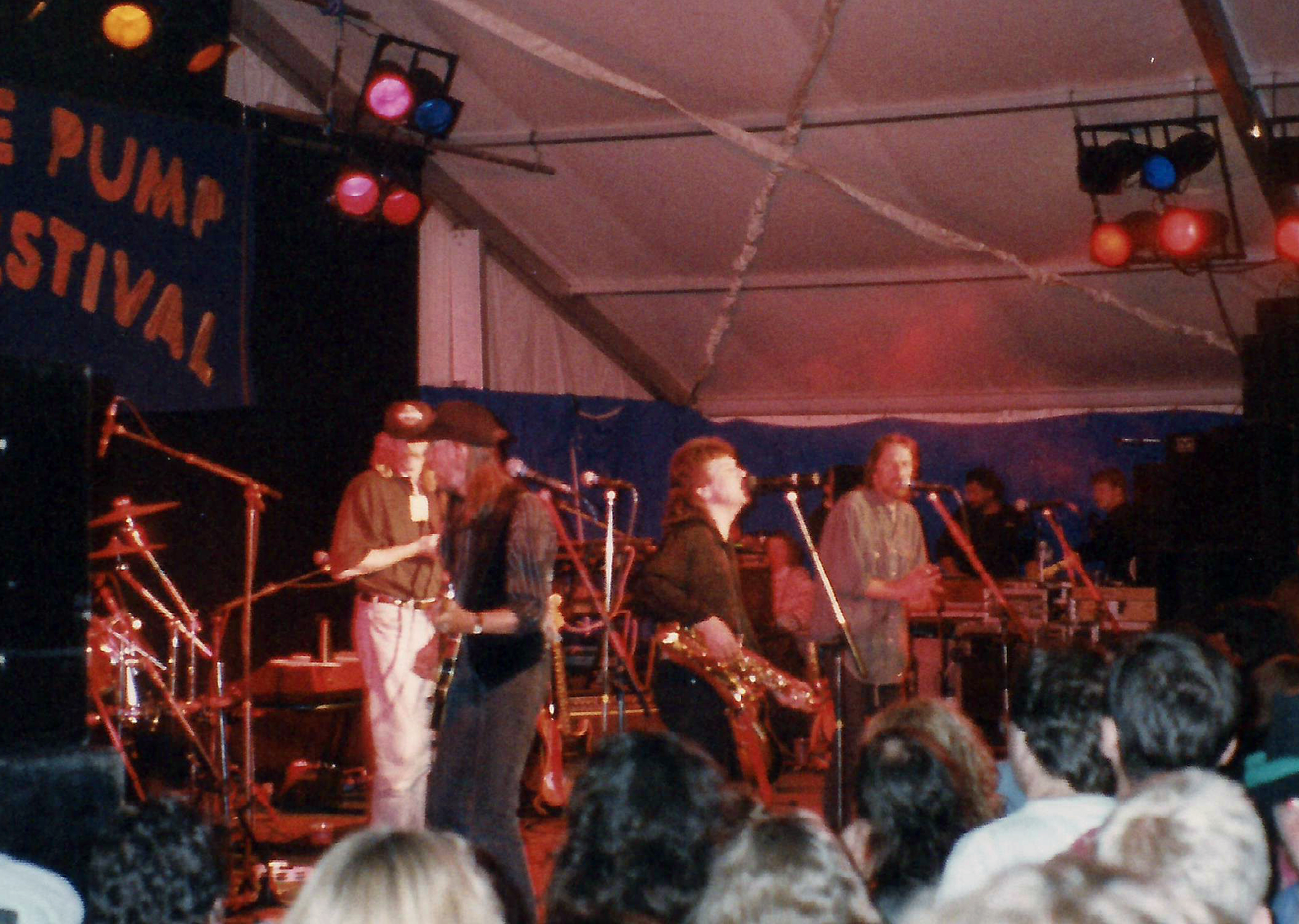
- Lindisfarne headlining in 1991
- Genre: Folk music, Blues, roots, Ceilidh, Celtic music
- Dates: Third weekend in July (3 days)
- Locations: Trowbridge, Wiltshire, England, UK
- Years active: 1973 – present
- Website: www.trowbridgefestival.co.uk

The Village Pump Festival is a folk music festival that takes place near Trowbridge, England. It has its roots 56 years ago in a barn at the Lamb Inn, Trowbridge, and later moved a few miles outside the town to Stowford Manor Farm at Farleigh Hungerford. The music covers a variety of genres from folk and roots to blues, celtic and Ceilidh with a variety of other entertainment including a family field, with puppetry and story telling.

== Background ==
The event arose from the folk club of the same name founded in Trowbridge in 1970 and the annual festival held there until 1984, when it moved to Stowford Manor Farm.

Prior to 2010, all events took place in marquees and the compact site includes camping, car parking, three separate stages plus children's tent, two beer tents and a myriad of trade stalls selling items from all over the world. 2010 saw the introduction of an outdoor main stage (the Moonshine Stage), with two marquees (the Horizon and Old Rosie Stages), and several additional small stages and undercover performance areas.

== History ==
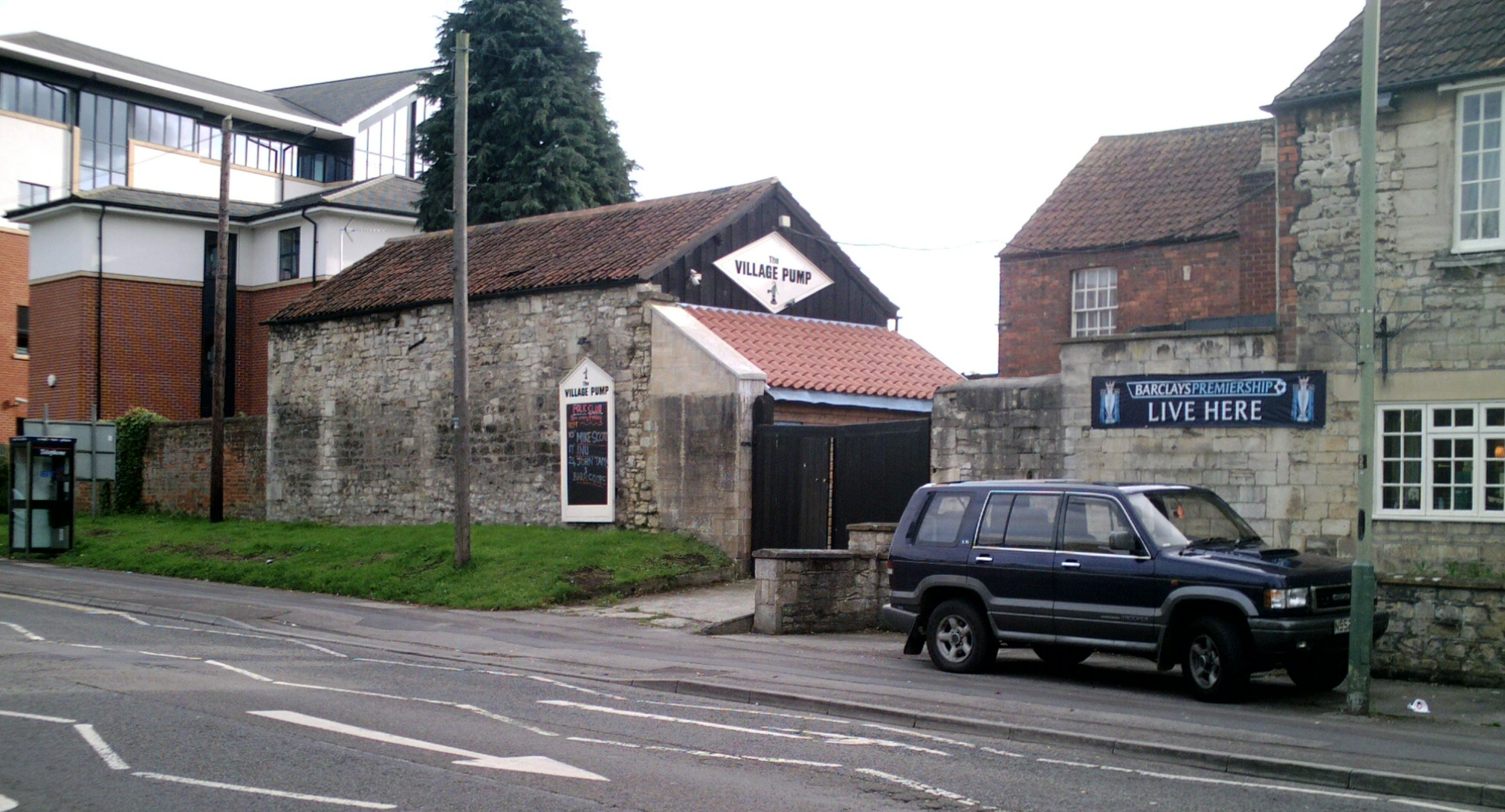
Original venue of the Village Pump folk club at the rear of The Lamb pub

The folk club of the same name was founded by Pat Drinkwater in 1970 in a former storeroom at the rear of The Lamb pub in Mortimer Street, Trowbridge. Early performers included Maddy Prior and Tim Hart, Keith Christmas, Dick Gaughan and Stéphane Grappelli. Many others later played there.

The first festival was held in 1974 before moving to Stowford Farm, Farleigh Hungerford, in 1980, under the direction of Alan Briars and Dave Newman. Newman died in 2005 and Briars in 2007.

In 2006 a group of enthusiasts relaunched the Village Pump folk club at The Lamb.

The 2011 event was called off, the first time this had happened, because of difficulties in obtaining ticket revenues from the online transaction company. Trowbridge Village Pump Festival Limited, the company that ran the festival, did not find out until late January 2010 that the online transaction provider had sold on that part of their business to another company. The new owner viewed festivals as very risky and applied conditions to the release of the ticket revenue, i.e. the monies would not be released until three months after the festival. It was by that time too late move to another provider, and the company shareholders voted to suspend the event.

Many of the original members decided to resurrect the festival under a new name. The 2012 Village Pump Folk Festival took place at White Horse Country Park, Westbury on 20–22 July 2012 with Show of Hands as festival patrons. It was covered by FromeFM.

Following disappointing ticket sales in 2015 and 2016, the organisers decided to take the Village Pump Folk Festival into voluntary liquidation. The 2017 festival was initially cancelled, but later a smaller festival was planned.

Another group of volunteers, including several previous committee members, organised a 2018 festival at Stowford Manor Farm. In 2019 the organisation was unable to meet Wiltshire Council's requirements for the event licence, and in 2020 the festival could not be held due to the COVID-19 pandemic.

In July 2022 a fundraiser weekend was held at the Lamb Inn, Trowbridge.

In July 2023, the festival returned for a weekend at a new site Greenhill Fields, Southwick nr. Trowbridge.

== 2010 line up ==
Moonshine Main Stage:

- Anxo Lorenzo
- Bellowhead
- Boney M (in place of Kid Creole & the Coconuts)
- Dreadzone
- Fisherman's Friends
- Gretchen Peters
- Heidi Talbot, Boo Hewerdine & Andy Cutting
- Jackie Oates & Mike Cosgrove
- Jassi Sidhu
- Jenny Bishop
- Jim Moray Band
- Kagemusha Taiko
- Kathryn Williams
- Lau
- Little Johnny England
- Luke Jackson
- Mary Black
- Netnakisum
- Pleneta Lem
- Russkaja
- Ruarri Joseph
- Show of Hands
- The Blockheads
- The Handsome Family
- Ukulele Orchestra of Great Britain
- Waterson Family

== 2009 line up ==
- 17 Hippies
- 3 Daft Monkeys
- Alabama 3
- Baaba Maal
- Luka Bloom
- The Destroyers
- Ade Edmondson & the Bad Shepherds
- Edward II
- Martyn Joseph
- Steve Knightley
- Seth Lakeman
- Eddie Martin
- Hazmat Modine
- Pete Morton
- O'Death
- Phantom Limb
- Saw Doctors
- Spiro
- Che Sudaka
- Thomas Truax
- Loudon Wainwright III
- Woodpigeon

== 2008 line up ==
- Battlefield Band
- Oysterband
- Hey Negrita
- Michael McGoldrick Big Band
- 6 Day Riot
- Show of Hands
- Little Feat
- Peatbog Faeries
- Martin Harley Band
- Dalla
- Richard Digance
- Vin Garbutt
- Devon Sproule
- Richard Thompson
- Fiamma Fumana
- Alabama 3
- Los Albertos
- Fred Wedlock
- Nick Harper
- John Tams & Barry Coope (of Coope Boyes and Simpson)
- Terem Quartet
- Phil Cool
- Andy Fairweather Low
- Don McLean
- Vin Garbutt
- Mike Scott
- Jackie Leven

== 2007 line up ==
- Roy Bailey
- Be Good Tanyas
- Bellowhead
- Eric Bibb
- Joe Brown
- Martin Carthy & Dave Swarbrick
- Ruthie Foster
- Hothouse Flowers
- Idiot and Friend (Les Barker and Keith Donnelly)
- Seth Lakeman
- The Levellers
- The Men They Couldn't Hang
- Jim Page
- Pine Leaf Boys
- Kate Rusby
- Sharon Shannon
- Martha Tilston and The Woods

== 2006 line up ==
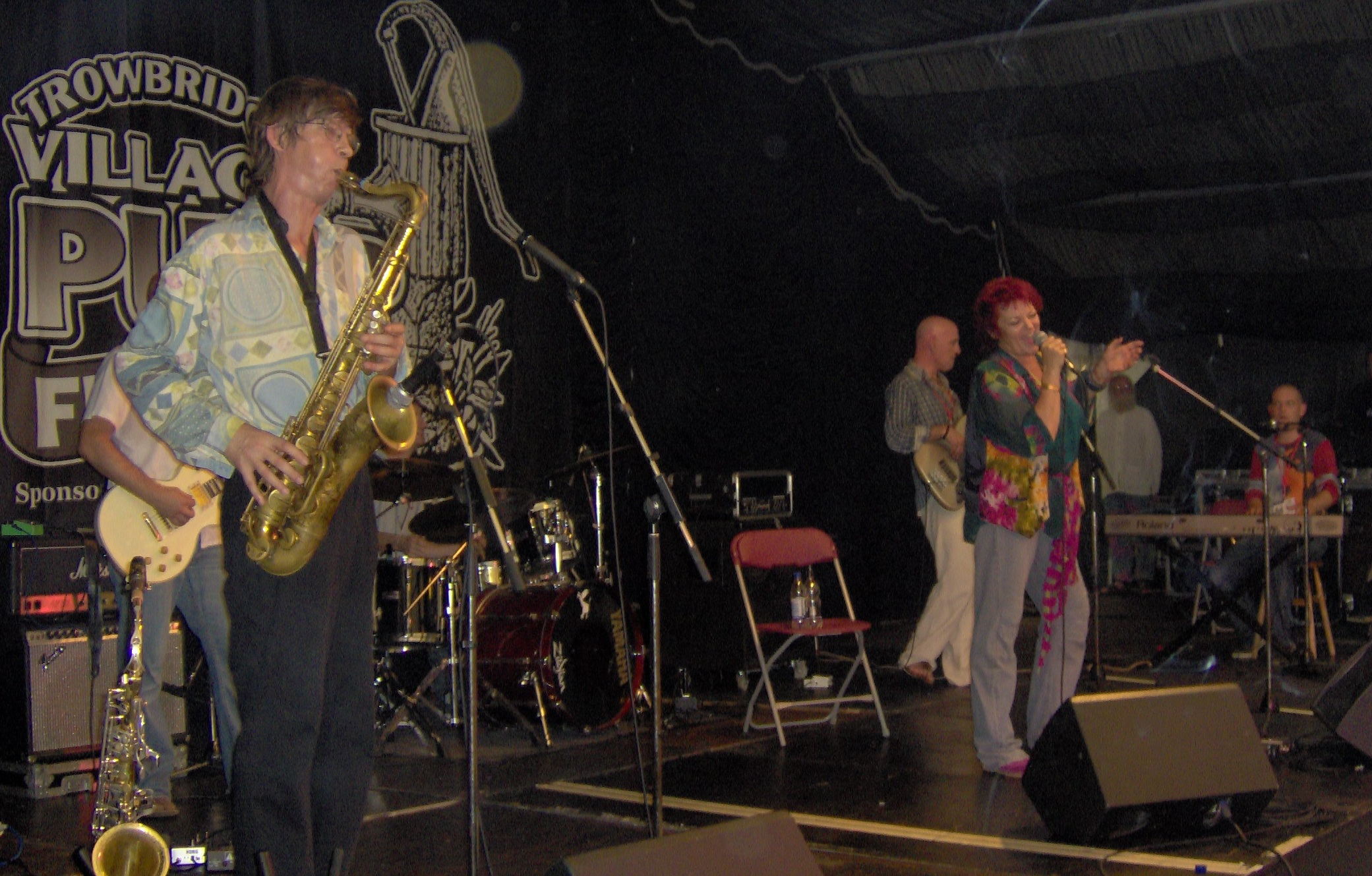
Dana Gillespie and her London Blues Band appearing at the 2006 Pump festival

- Los de Abajo
- Los Albertos
- Allan Yn Y Fan
- Altan
- Baka Beyond
- Eliza Carthy & the Ratcatchers
- Keith Christmas
- Costo Rico
- Mary Flower
- Dana Gillespie & her London Blues Band
- Nine Below Zero
- Osibisa
- Gretchen Peters
- The Karine Polwart Band
- Show of Hands
- Stripey-Jumper
- Rachel Unthank and the Winterset
- Suzanne Vega
- The Wailin' Jennys
- Hank Wangford & Reg Meuross
- The Waterboys
- Waterson–Carthy

== 2005 line up ==
- 3 Daft Monkeys
- Bellowhead
- Paul Brady
- Hayseed Dixie
- Aynsley Lister
- Lunasa
- Rory McLeod
- Ralph McTell
- Jim Moray 4
- Mozaik (Andy Irvine, Donal Lunny etc)
- The Proclaimers
- The Saw Doctors
- Glenn Tilbrook & the Fluffers
- Steve Tilston & Brooks Williams

== 2004 line up ==
- Les Barker
- Eliza Carthy Band
- Celloman
- Ashley Hutchings's Morris On Show
- The Levellers
- Oysterband
- Eddi Reader
- Show of Hands
- Chris Smither
- Strawbs
- Richard Thompson
- Waking the Witch

== Gallery ==
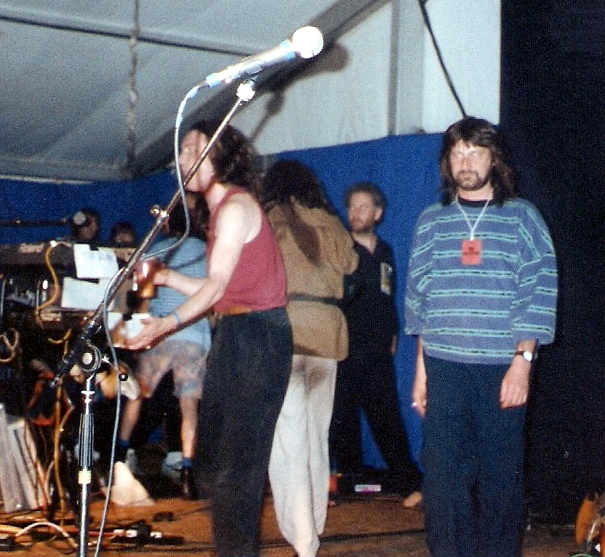
Alan Briars (right) supervising the main stage in 1991

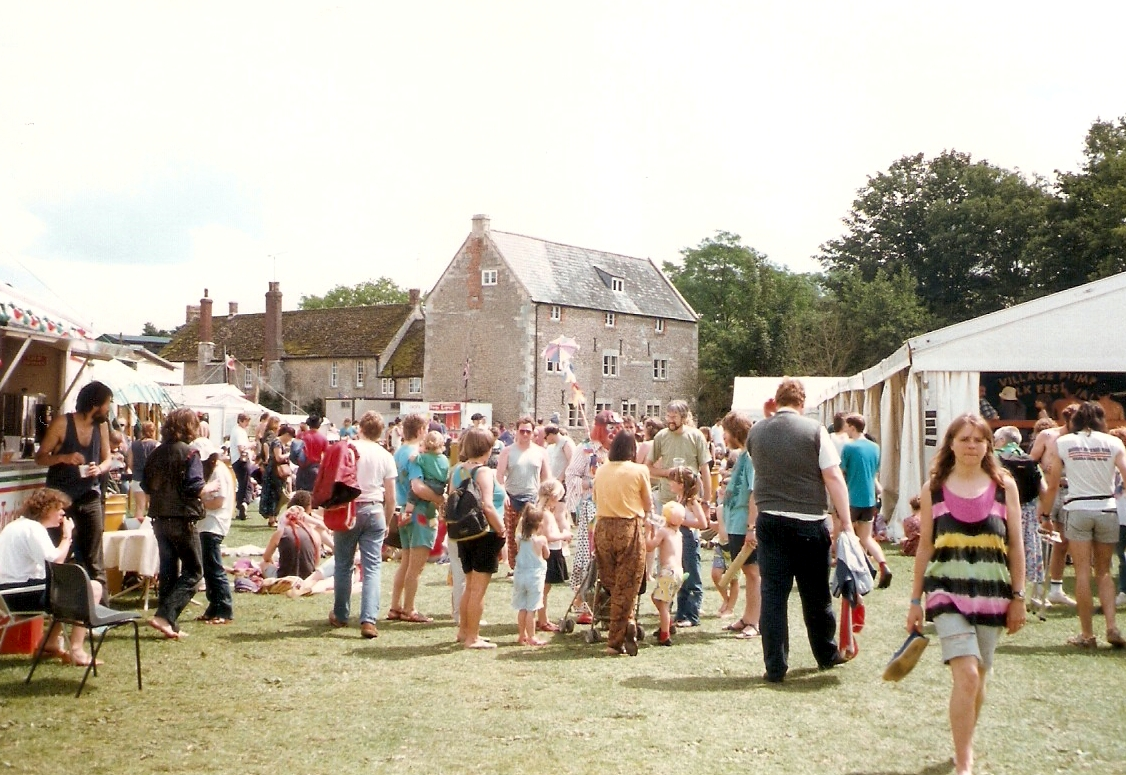
Site of the 1991 festival, with main tent to right and manor house to rear

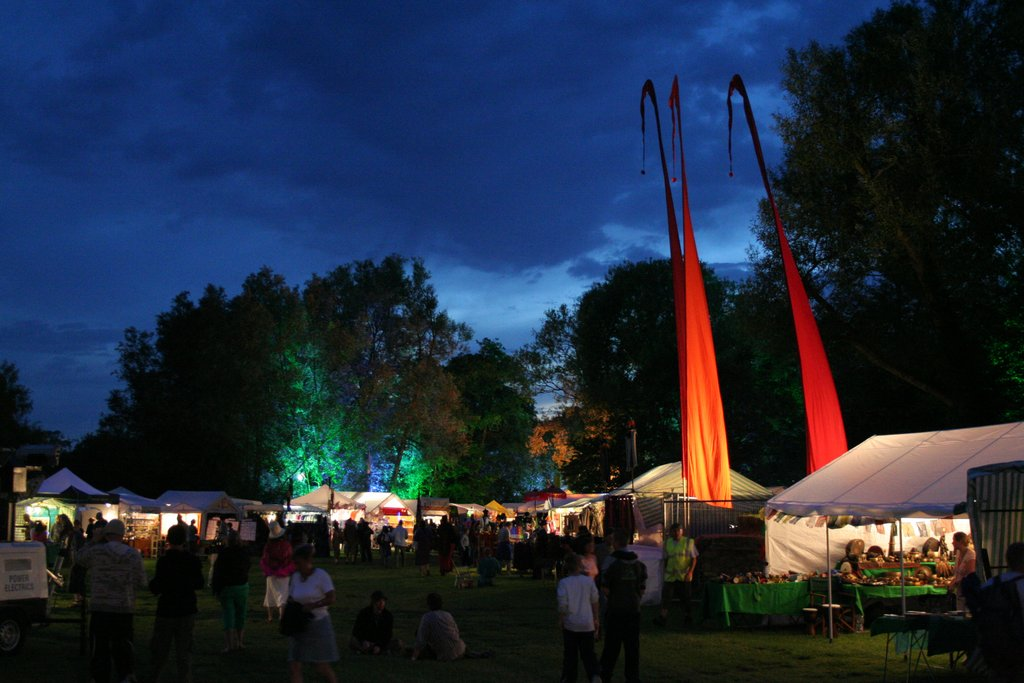
The second field in 2008
