= Waking the Witch =

Waking the Witch may refer to:

- The use of sleep deprivation in Witch trials in early modern Scotland
- Waking the Witch (band), a British band
- Waking the Witch (novel), a novel in the Women of the Otherworld series by Kelley Armstrong
- "Waking the Witch", a song by Kate Bush from the album Hounds of Love
- Waking the Witch, an opera by Ashi Day
