= Jenna Gribbon =

American painter (born 1978)

- Born: 1978 (age 47–48); Knoxville, Tennessee, U.S.
- Education: University of Georgia (BFA); Hunter College (MFA)
- Occupations: Artist; painter
- Years active: 2003–present
- Spouse(s): Matthew Gribbon (divorced) Torres (m. 2022)
- Children: 1

Jenna Gribbon (née Brown; born 1978) is an American artist and painter living and working in Brooklyn. She is best known for her figurative paintings whose primary subject is her spouse, Torres. Gribbon frequently depicts Scott in candid, everyday scenes or overtly theatrical setups.

Her work has been exhibited in various museums and collections, including the Frick Collection, the Collezione Maramotti, the Modern Art Museum of Fort Worth, and the Museum of Modern Art, Warsaw. She also painted portraits featured in Sofia Coppola's 2006 film Marie Antoinette.

== Early life and education ==
Jenna Gribbon was born Jenna Brown in 1978 in Knoxville, Tennessee. Her parents divorced when she was two, and at the age of five, she moved near Atlanta, Georgia with her mother and brother.

Gribbon took an interest in art at an early age. She later studied drawing and painting at the University of Georgia's Lamar Dodd School of Art, graduating in 2001 with a Bachelor of Fine Arts. While attending Lamar Dodd, she also experimented with filmmaking using Super 8 film.

== Career ==
In 2003, Gribbon moved to New York City to pursue a career in art, where she briefly worked as a cocktail waitress and a color technician for artist Jeff Koons. In 2006, she was commissioned to paint copies of three portraits for Sofia Coppola's film Marie Antoinette. From October to November that year, her debut solo show Empty Paintings and Imaginary Sculptures was exhibited at the Sarah Bowen Gallery in Williamsburg, Brooklyn.

In 2010, Gribbon and writer Julian Tepper founded the Oracle Club, a literary salon and artist workspace in Long Island City. While running the salon, Gribbon continued painting portraits of her friends and family and exhibiting work. When the Oracle Club closed in 2016 due to rising rent, she began studying at Hunter College, graduating in 2019 with her Master of Fine Arts. In 2018, she was commissioned to create a portrait of Elsie Fisher for the film poster of Bo Burnham's Eighth Grade.

After graduating, Gribbon's work largely focused on the exploration of queer identity and sensuality, and she has received positive reviews for her intimate depictions of women and gender in various solo shows. She has cited artists like Édouard Manet, Jacques Rivette, Mary Cassatt, Karen Kilmnik, and Jean-Honoré Fragonard as inspirations for her work.

Gribbon directed the music video for Torres' "Too Big for the Glory Hole" in 2020. She also painted the cover art for Torres's albums Silver Tongue (2020) and Thirstier (2021). In 2021, her paintings appeared in a two-person show at Sim Smith Gallery, alongside the films of Agnès Varda, who Gribbon has cited as an inspiration for her work.

Her work has also been featured in group exhibitions at the Museum of Modern Art, Warsaw, the Museum of Contemporary Art Jacksonville, the Modern Art Museum of Fort Worth, and the Leslie-Lohman Museum of Art. At the Frick Collection in 2022, Gribbon's painting What Am I Doing Here? I Should Ask You the Same appeared in juxtaposition to Hans Holbein the Younger's portrait of Thomas Cromwell, occupying the space typically reserved for Holbein's portrait of Thomas More. That October, her solo show Mirages opened at the Collezione Maramotti. From September to October 2024, the David Kordansky Gallery exhibited her show Like Looking in a Mirror.

In her introduction for the 2023–24 exhibition Jenna Gribbon: The Honeymoon Show, at the Lévy Gorvy Dayan Gallery, curator Alison M. Gingeras wrote:

Her paintings demonstrate how a muse can also be a full-fledged subject, as opposed to a one-dimensional object of desire, and that looking as well as depicting can be an ethical, equitable exchange, and that desire or love can be conjured reciprocally without recourse to objectification, an ethos similarly articulated in [Celia] Paul's Self-Portrait.

== Personal life ==
As a senior at the University of Georgia, Gribbon married Matthew Gribbon, another artist, though they divorced shortly after. In 2010, she and her then-partner Julian Tepper had a son, Silas, who is a frequent subject of Gribbon's paintings. She has frequently spoken on the impact of motherhood on her work and the sexism she has faced as a mother.

In 2017, Gribbon met American singer-songwriter Mackenzie Scott (known professionally as Torres) at a bar in the East Village, and by 2019, they had moved into a "live-work space" in Bushwick, Brooklyn together. Gribbon proposed to Scott in October 2020, and they married in November 2022.
