= Sound Mind Live =

Brooklyn-based non-profit organization

- Founder: Chris Bullard
- Type: Nonprofit
- Website: www.soundmindlive.org

Sound Mind Live (also known as Sound Mind) is a non-profit organization that focuses on building a community and open dialogue around mental health through music. The organization elevates mental health resources and programs by producing events, digital media content, online advocacy campaigns, and partnering with music artist tours.

== History ==
Sound Mind Live was founded by Chris Bullard, a musician who formerly performed with Willie Nelson and was diagnosed with bipolar disorder when he was in his 20s. He founded Sound Mind to transform views of mental health, much in the way Nelson brought attention to the plight of American farmers with Farm Aid. The organization developed from the idea that music artists are in a leadership position to challenge the public's perception of mental health. Many artists performing for Sound Mind have been open about their own struggles with mental health.

== Events and programs ==
In May 2019, Sound Mind hosted its first event, a mental health benefit concert with participation from Langhorne Slim, Torres and other artists. To address the concern regarding mental health stemming from the quarantine as a result of COVID-19, in April 2020, the organization hosted Closer in Crisis, a virtual concert to support mental health programs for the music community. The event was presented in partnership with Mental Health America and National Alliance on Mental Illness of New York City.

Sound Mind Live partnered with Consequence of Sound to produce a podcast series called Going There with Dr. Mike that explores mental health through the personal journeys of musicians.

The organization also hosts an annual mental health music festival. Performers at the event have included Jason Isbell, Fitz and The Tantrums, and All Time Low.
