= All Is Yes =

Studio album by The Blessing
- Released: 7 February 2008
- Recorded: 2007
- Genre: jazz rock
- Label: Cake/Candid

The Blessing chronology
All Is Yes (2008)	Bugs in Amber (2009)

Professional ratings
Review scores
Source	Rating
All About Jazz	
BBC	
The Independent	
Jazzwise	3/5 stars

All Is Yes is the 2008 (see 2008 in music) debut album by Get the Blessing (known as The Blessing at the time of its release), the jazz rock quartet based in Bristol, England. The album won best album at the 2008 BBC Jazz Awards.

== Track listing ==
1. "Bleach Cake" – 2:59
2. "That Ain't It" – 5:23
3. "Another Brother's Mother" – 3:24
4. "Cake Hole" – 4:33
5. "Loubia" – 8:19
6. "Can't Believe in Faith" – 3:33
7. "Thermos" – 3:53
8. "Suki's Suzuki" – 3:23
9. "Equal and Opposite" – 5:14
10. "Small Fish, Small Pond" – 4:22
- Note: "Equal and Opposite" has been mastered with a minute's silence at the end, making the track 6:14 in total. "Small Fish, Small Pond" is not listed.

== Personnel ==
- Jake McMurchie – saxophone, gong
- Pete Judge – trumpet, glockenspiel
- Jim Barr – double bass, bass guitar, vibraphone
- Clive Deamer – drums

=== Guests ===
- Adrian Utley – electric guitar ("That Ain't It")
- Tammy Payne – vocals ("Loubia")
- Gina Griffin – violin ("Loubia")

=== Technical ===
- Recorded live at J&J Studios, Bristol, 2007
- Mixed by Jim Barr
- Mastered by Shawn Joseph

== Release history ==
- 7 February 2008: Cake Music (Candid Records, CACD 78550)
