= Stripey-Jumper =

Stripey-Jumper was a British street theatre group that claimed to have set the world's record for the largest number of people simultaneously playing spoons musically. 345 people gathered in Trowbridge, south west England, on 23 July 2006 at the Trowbridge Village Pump Festival to join The Banjo Billys and perform a version of the British pub song "Knees Up Mother Brown" in front of a group of judges. The judges sent the verified count to the board of Guinness World Records for validation.

The disbanding of the Stripey-Jumper Walkabout Theatre was announced on 4 April 2008.
