= Bugs in Amber =

Studio album by Get the Blessing
- Released: 22 April 2009
- Recorded: 2008
- Genre: jazz rock
- Label: Cake/Candid

Get the Blessing chronology
All is Yes (2008)	Bugs in Amber (2009)	OCDC (2012)

Professional ratings
Review scores
Source	Rating
The Guardian	4/5 stars
The Sunday Times	3/5 stars
The Independent	(not rated)

Bugs in Amber is the second album by the Bristol based jazz rock quartet Get the Blessing, released in 2009 (see 2008 in music).

The tracks are all instrumental, although other versions of "The Unnameable" and "Bugs in Amber" (re-titled "Moot") have been performed with vocals live, and recorded in session for the BBC 6Music Freakzone programme.

The album was favourably received by the British broadsheets. The Sunday Times stated that "Get the Blessing care little for the rule book: “wonky rock-jazz” is how the Bristol quartet sum up the sax and trumpet interplay. There’s a cool intelligence at work... Deamer lays down the firmest of beats without drowning his colleagues in the backwash. One of the quirkiest British releases of the year". The Guardian noted that "this follow-up... cuts the excellent Judge and McMurchie a lot more solo slack, while sustaining the strength of the composing, the deafening dancefloor drive and the ensemble inventiveness", and summed up with "This is a really varied and inventive genre-crossing set". The Independent felt the band "sound even more live and dangerous on this follow-up" and "like Big Air, the horns now take their thrashy/delicate influences from the Balkans as much as free jazz".

== Track listing ==
1. "Music Style Product" – 3:56
2. "The Word For Moonlight Is Moonlight" – 4:22
3. "The Unnameable" – 6:33
4. "Bugs in Amber" – 4:41
5. "Tarp" – 7:00
6. "Einstein Action Figure" – 4:09
7. "The Speed Of Dark" – 5:23
8. "So It Goes" – 3:08
9. "Yes I Said Yes I Will Yes" – 2:09
10. "Trapdoor" – 1:21

== Personnel ==
- Jake McMurchie – saxophone, treated piano, vibraphone, effects, bells
- Pete Judge – trumpet, flugelhorn, celeste, effects, bells
- Jim Barr – bass guitar, baritone guitar, effects, bells
- Clive Deamer – drums, maracas, bells

=== Guests ===
- Adrian Utley – electric guitar
- Tammy Payne – backing vocals ("Music Style Product")
- Beth Porter – cello ("The Unnameable")
- Jeff Spencer – viola ("Music Style Product")

=== Technical ===
- Produced by Jim Barr and Get the Blessing
- Engineered by Jim Barr and Rik Dowding
- Mixed by Jim Barr and Get the Blessing
- Mastered by Shawn Joseph, Optimum Studios

== Release history ==
- 22 April 2009: Cake Music (Candid Records, CACD78558)
