= Thirstier =

Studio album by Torres
- Released: July 30, 2021
- Recorded: 2020
- Studios: Middle Farm Studios, Devon, UK
- Genres: Rock; synth-pop; alternative rock; grunge-pop
- Length: 35:20
- Label: Merge
- Producers: Rob Ellis; Mackenzie Scott

Torres chronology
Silver Tongue (2020)	Thirstier (2021)	What an Enormous Room (2024)

Singles from Thirstier
- 1. "Don't Go Puttin Wishes in My Head" Released: May 12, 2021; 2. "Thirstier" Released: July 14, 2021

Thirstier is the fifth studio album by American musician Torres. It was released on July 30, 2021, through Merge Records.

== Background and release ==
Thirstier follows Torres's 2020 album, Silver Tongue. Recorded in fall 2020 at Middle Farm Studios, UK, the album was produced by Torres with her long-time collaborators Rob Ellis and Peter Miles. It was mixed by TJ Allen. The record was announced in May 2021, alongside the cover-art and tracklist. The second track "Don't Go Puttin Wishes in My Head" was served as the first single from the album on 12 May. The title track was released as the album's second single on 14 July. Thirstier was released on 30 July 2021 by Merge Records.

== Critical reception ==
Professional ratings
Aggregate scores
Source	Rating
AnyDecentMusic?	7.8/10
Metacritic	81/100
Review scores
Source	Rating
AllMusic	4/5 stars
Clash	8/10
DIY	4/5 stars
musicOMH	4/5 stars
NME	4/5 stars
Paste	7.9/10
Pitchfork	7.8/10
Slant Magazine	4/5 stars
Under the Radar	8/10 stars

At Metacritic, which assigns a weighted average rating out of 100 to reviews from mainstream publications, this release received an average score of 81, based on 14 reviews, indicating "universal acclaim". At AnyDecentMusic?, which collates album reviews from websites, magazines and newspapers, they gave the release a 7.8 out of 10, based on a critical consensus of 15 reviews.

== Track listing ==
All tracks are written by Mackenzie Scott.

Thirstier track listing
No.	Title	Length
1.	"Are You Sleepwalking?"	2:40
2.	"Don't Go Puttin Wishes in My Head"	4:22
3.	"Constant Tomorrowland"	2:40
4.	"Drive Me"	3:38
5.	"Big Leap"	3:00
6.	"Hug from a Dinosaur"	3:18
7.	"Thirstier"	4:08
8.	"Kiss the Corners"	3:45
9.	"Hand in the Air"	3:43
10.	"Keep the Devil Out"	4:06
Total length:		35:20

== Personnel ==
- Mackenzie Scott – vocals, guitars, production (all tracks); synthesizers (tracks 1–6, 9), loops (1, 4, 7, 8, 10); mandola, bouzouki (2); programming (3), autoharp (5, 9), percussion (6), flute (9)
- Rob Ellis – production (all tracks), drums (tracks 1–8, 10), synthesizers (1, 3–5, 8–10), backing vocals (1, 4, 6, 8–10), percussion (2–9), glockenspiel (3), piano (3, 4, 8, 9); loops, autoharp (4); keyboards (7)
- Peter Miles – co-production, engineering (all tracks); bass guitar (tracks 1–7), synthesizers (1–5, 7–10), drums (1, 3, 4, 9), loops (1, 4, 5, 8, 9), percussion (3, 6, 10), Mellotron (3), piano (6)
- TJ Allen – mixing (all tracks), shakers (track 2), electric piano (3), bass synthesizer (4)
- Heba Kadry – mastering
- Amy Dragon – mastering for vinyl
- Adrian Utley – synthesizers (track 1)
- Ben Christophers – synthesizers (tracks 3, 8), Marxophone (5, 9), phonofiddle (8), harp (9)
- Simon Dobson – trumpet (track 7)
- Jenna Gribbon – cover painting
- Daniel Murphy – design

== Charts ==
Chart performance for Thirstier
Chart (2021)	Peak position
Scottish Albums (Official Charts)	58
