= What an Enormous Room =

Studio album by Torres
- Released: January 26, 2024
- Studio: Stadium Heights (Durham)
- Length: 35:46
- Label: Merge
- Producer: Sarah Jaffe; Mackenzie Scott

Torres chronology
Thirstier (2021)	What an Enormous Room (2024)	Send a Prayer My Way (2025)

What an Enormous Room is the sixth studio album by American musician Torres, released on January 26, 2024, through Merge Records. It was produced by Torres and Sarah Jaffe and received positive reviews from critics.

== Critical reception ==
Professional ratings
Aggregate scores
Source	Rating
Metacritic	74/100
Review scores
Source	Rating
The Guardian	3.5/5 stars
Mojo	3/5 stars
Pitchfork	7.0/10
Slant Magazine	4/5 stars
Uncut	7/10

What an Enormous Room received a score of 74 out of 100 on review aggregator Metacritic based on 12 critics' reviews, indicating "generally favorable" reception. Uncut wrote that the album "takes [Torres's] eclecticism to fresh heights, each of these songs exploring different emotional moods while influences range from The Breeders to Goldfrapp". Eric Mason of Slant Magazine observed that the album "favor[s] the kind of introspective dirges that characterized her early work. As a result, the album offers slightly less in the way of hooks but homes in further on themes of anxious attachment and personal growth".

Mojo felt that "there's no doubt Mackenzie Scott never stops moving here, switching between gothic sway, grungy stomp and electro-pop gyration, but it can make it hard to catch her eye in a meaningful way". The Guardian's Katie Hawthorne stated that Torres "embraces grand new sonic theatrics" but that the album "doesn't yet fulfil [her] stadium-sized promises". Reviewing the album for Pitchfork, Claire Shaffer commented that "Scott has excelled at adding a jagged, oddball edge to familiar rock structures. At its best, this album pushes further into the weird."

== Track listing ==
All tracks are written by Mackenzie Scott.

What an Enormous Room track listing
No.	Title	Length
1.	"Happy Man's Shoes"	3:27
2.	"Life as We Don't Know It"	1:45
3.	"I Got the Fear"	3:24
4.	"Wake to Flowers"	2:58
5.	"Ugly Mystery"	2:22
6.	"Collect"	2:56
7.	"Artificial Limits"	6:02
8.	"Jerk into Joy"	4:38
9.	"Forever Home"	3:39
10.	"Songbird Forever"	4:35
Total length:		35:46

== Personnel ==
Credits adapted from the album's liner notes.

- Mackenzie Scott – vocals, guitar, bass, synthesizer, organ, piano, drum programming, production
- Sarah Jaffe – bass, drums, synthesizer, organ, piano, production
- TJ Allen – additional synth bass, shakers, tambourine, mixing
- Heba Kadry – mastering
- Ryan Pickett – engineering
- Dani Okon – front and back cover photos
- Daniel Murphy – layout
