= Three Futures =

Studio album by Torres
- Released: September 29, 2017
- Studios: Eve Studios (Manchester, United Kingdom), Silkhay (Bridport, United Kingdom)
- Genres: Folk rock; alternative rock
- Length: 46:06
- Label: 4AD
- Producers: Rob Ellis; Mackenzie Scott

Torres chronology
Sprinter (2015)	Three Futures (2017)	Silver Tongue (2020)

Professional ratings
Aggregate scores
Source	Rating
Metacritic	81/100
Review scores
Source	Rating
AllMusic	4/5 stars
The A.V. Club	A−
Consequence of Sound	B+
DIY Magazine	4/5 stars
The Line of Best Fit	8/10
Mojo	3/5 stars
Pitchfork	8.0/10
Spin	8/10
Uncut	4/5 stars
Under the Radar	6.5/10

Three Futures is the third studio album by Torres (née Mackenzie Scott), released on September 29, 2017, on 4AD Records. The album was recorded in England. As with Torres' last album Sprinter, Three Futures was produced by Rob Eliis. The album was mixed by David Tolomel.

== Production ==
Three Futures was recorded in Stockport and Dorset, England once again with co-producer Rob Ellis, who also produced her last album, Sprinter. David Tolomei was chosen to mix the album.

== Artwork ==
The album cover prominently features an example of the at the time frequented satirized manspreading trend. Torres explained it reminded her of the idea that “men take up more space”.

== Track listing ==
All tracks written by Mackenzie Scott, except where noted

No.	Title	Writer(s)	Length
1.	"Tongue Slap Your Brains Out"		3:20
2.	"Skim"		5:18
3.	"Three Futures"		4:04
4.	"Righteous Woman"		3:50
5.	"Greener Stretch"		4:45
6.	"Helen in the Woods"		2:33
7.	"Bad Baby Pie"		4:39
8.	"Marble Focus"		5:03
9.	"Concrete Ganesha"		4:30
10.	"To Be Given a Body"	M. Scott, Cynthia Scott	8:04
Total length:			46:06

== Personnel ==
- Mackenzie Scott – vocals, guitar, drum programming, synthesizer, producer
- Rob Ellis – electronic drums, synthesizer, drum programming, producer
- Chris Hamilton – synthesizer, drum machine, electronics, engineer
- Dahm Majuri Cipolla – drums, electronics
- Cameron Kapoor – guitar, synthesizer, electronics
- Adrian Utley – synthesizer
- Erin Manning – synthesizer, keyboards, electronics
- Ben Christophers – synthesizer, omnichord, electronics
- Henry Broadhead – engineer
- Heba Kadry – mastering
- David Tolomei – mixing
