= Get the Blessing =

British jazz group

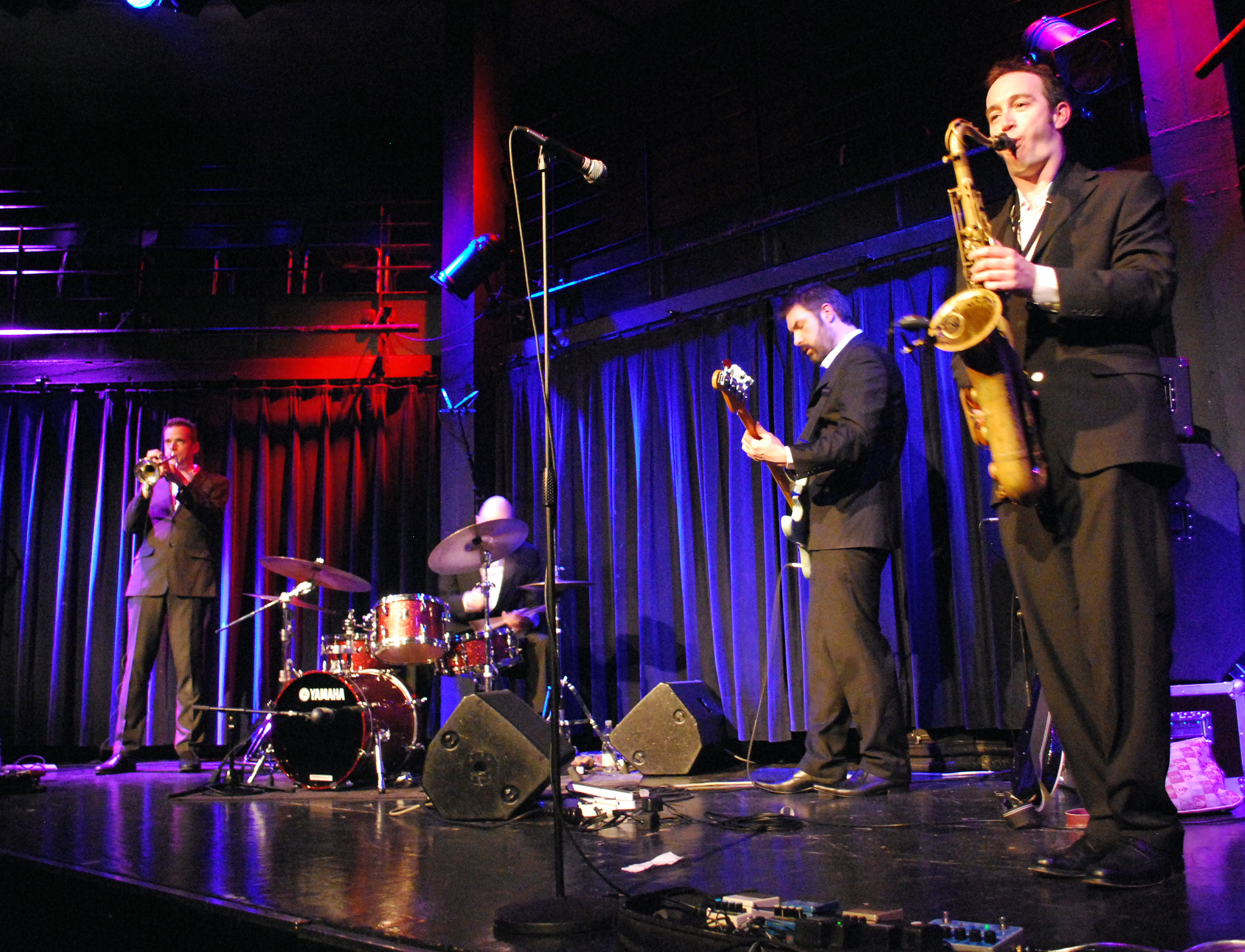
- Get the Blessing, Treibhaus Innsbruck 2011

Background information
- Also known as: The Blessing
- Origin: Bristol, England, United Kingdom
- Genres: Jazz rock
- Years active: 1999–present
- Label: Cake/Candid
- Members: Jake McMurchie; Pete Judge; Jim Barr; Clive Deamer
- Website: gettheblessing.com

Get the Blessing (previously known as the Blessing) are a jazz rock quartet based in Bristol, England. The band formed in 1999 when Jim Barr (bass guitar) and Clive Deamer (drums), who had played with Portishead, joined Jake McMurchie (saxophone) and Pete Judge (trumpet) over their appreciation of Ornette Coleman.

Get the Blessing have released several albums; All Is Yes won best album at the 2008 BBC Jazz Awards. Their album Bristopia was released in 2018.

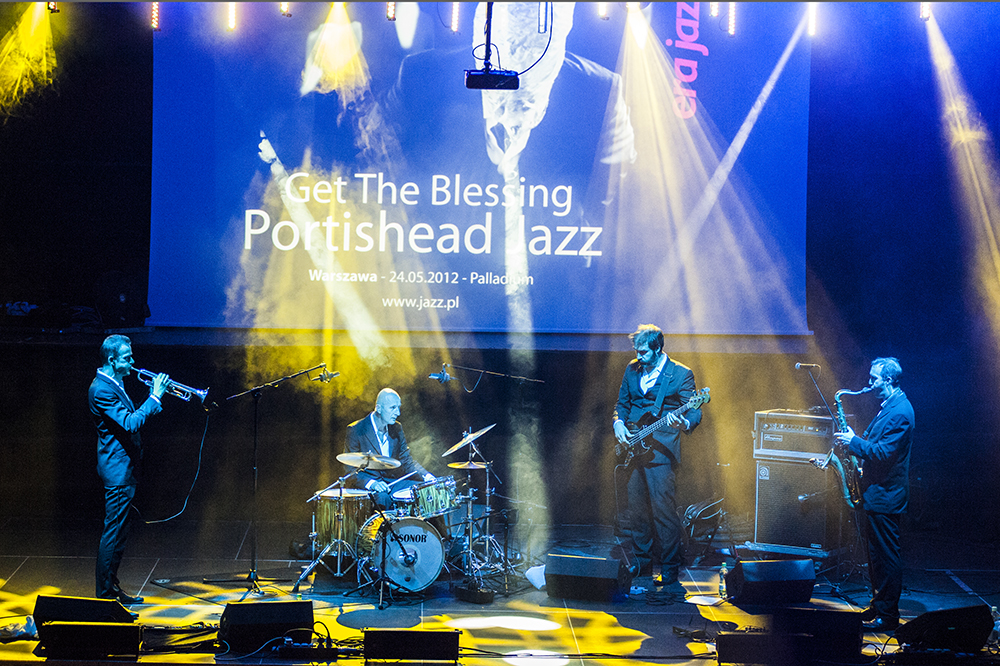
British jazz quartet Get the Blessing in concert at The Palladium, Warsaw, Poland - May 2012.

== Style ==
Get the Blessing combine jazz and rock. Most of their songs are instrumental, although there have been guest singers such as Tammy Payne on "The Unnameable" and "Music Style Product" and Deamer on "Bugs in Amber". For promotional pictures and record covers, they often cover their heads with orange cellophane. The Guardian wrote that the band's music contains "horn laments and full-on free thrashes". The Times described their live performances have been described as "technically audacious, mysterious and droll".

== Members ==
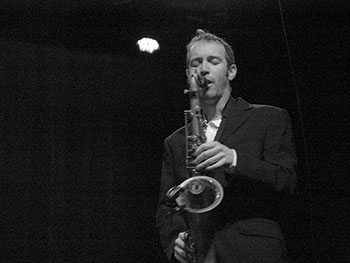
Jake McMurchie

- Pete Judge (trumpet) has composed music for soundtracks and has worked with three cane whale, Alex Vann of Spiro, Paul Bradley of Me band, and Eyebrow with Paul Wigens of Blurt.
- Jake McMurchie (saxophone) leads the band Michelson Morley and has played with Portishead and the National Youth Jazz Orchestra.
- Jim Barr (bass guitar) – Barr is a session musician who has worked with Peter Gabriel and Portishead.
- Clive Deamer (drums, vocals) is a session musician who has played with Radiohead, Portishead, Jeff Beck, Alison Moyet, Siouxsie Sioux, Roni Size, and Reprazent. He has been a member of Hawkwind and Robert Plant's Strange Sensation.

== Discography ==
- 2008 – All Is Yes (released as the Blessing) (Cake/Candid)
- 2008 – Bleach Cake/The Unnameable (released as the Blessing) (Cake/Candid)
- 2009 – Bugs in Amber (Cake/Candid)
- 2012 – OCDC (Naim Jazz)
- 2014 – Lope and Antilope (Naim Jazz)
- 2015 – Astronautilus (Naim Jazz)
- 2018 – Bristopia (Kartel)
- 2020 - Rarer Teas (Kartel)
- 2023 - Pallett (All is Yes Records)
