= Torres (album) =

Studio album by Torres
- Released: January 22, 2013
- Recorded: Summer 2012
- Studios: Franklin, Tennessee, United States
- Genres: Rock, folk
- Length: 51:38
- Label: Independent
- Producers: Mackenzie Scott, Ryan McFadden

Torres chronology
Torres (2013)	Sprinter (2015)

Torres (stylized in all caps) is the debut studio album by Torres, released independently in January 2013. The album was recorded over the course of five days by Nashville audio engineer Ryan McFadden in a recording studio in Franklin, Tennessee.

== Critical reception ==
Professional ratings
Aggregate scores
Source	Rating
Metacritic	81/100
Review scores
Source	Rating
Pretty Much Amazing	A−
No Ripcord	9/10
BPM	8.6/10
Pitchfork	8.1/10
Boston Phoenix	3/4 stars
Drowned in Sound	7/10
Nashville Scene	4/5
NME	9/10

TORRES has received generally favorable reviews from several mainstream critic websites including BPM, Pitchfork, and Drowned in Sound. Metacritic, which assigns an average score based on various professional ratings, gave the album an 81/100, based on 11 reviews, indicating "universal acclaim". Critics praised Scott's powerful, raw voice and the live, intimate recording style as notable attractions of the record. Jayson Greene of Pitchfork wrote, "Mackenzie Scott's voice conveys raw, urgent desperation, the sort we flinch from instinctually and are attuned, on a primal level, to heed." Drew Malmuth of Pretty Much Amazing wrote, "TORRES is an album that is pulsating with life."

== Track listing ==
All music and lyrics by Mackenzie Scott

No.	Title	Length
1.	"Mother Earth, Father God"	4:31
2.	"Honey"	5:40
3.	"Jealousy and I"	4:32
4.	"November Baby"	7:04
5.	"When Winter's Over"	3:30
6.	"Chains"	5:48
7.	"Moon & Back"	4:17
8.	"Don't Run Away, Emilie"	4:50
9.	"Come to Terms"	5:19
10.	"Waterfall"	6:07

== Personnel ==
Musicians

- Mackenzie Scott – singing/voices, guitar, percussion
- Chris DePorter – drums, percussion
- Brady Surface – bass, synth
- Mark Sloan – guitar, rhodes
- Bobby Chase – violin
- Larissa Maestro – cello
- Natalie Prass – vocal harmonies on "November Baby"
- Ryan McFadden – drum programming on "Chains" and "Don't Run Away, Emilie"

Production

- Mackenzie Scott – Co-Producer
- Ryan McFadden – Co-Producer, Engineer, Mixing
- Andrew Darby – Mastering

Art Direction

- Jess Cohen – Design, Inside Photo, Layout
- Bobby Herb – Cover Photo

== Releases ==
Region	Date	Label	Format
Worldwide	22 January 2013	Independent	MP3
United States	8 February 2013	Independent	CD, Vinyl
Europe	11 November 2013	Independent	CD
United States	14 March 2014	Misra Records	Cassette
