= Send a Prayer My Way =

Studio album by Julien Baker & Torres
- Released: April 18, 2025
- Genres: Country; alternative country
- Length: 39:37
- Label: Matador
- Producers: Julien Baker; Mackenzie Scott; Sarah Tudzin

Julien Baker chronology
The Rest (2023)	Send a Prayer My Way (2025)	This World or the Next (2027)

Torres chronology
What an Enormous Room (2024)	Send a Prayer My Way (2025)

Singles from Send a Prayer My Way
- 1. "Sugar in the Tank" Released: December 13, 2024; 2. "Sylvia" Released: January 29, 2025; 3. "Tuesday" Released: February 26, 2025; 4. "Dirt" Released: March 26, 2025; 5. "Bottom of a Bottle" Released: April 15, 2025

Send a Prayer My Way is the debut studio album from American country duo Julien Baker & Torres. The album was released on April 18, 2025, by Matador Records.

== Background ==
In 2016, Torres and Baker performed at a show together at Lincoln Hall in Chicago, Illinois, where both had expressed an interest in collaborating one day. In 2019, Scott texted Baker nonchalantly inquiring if Baker would be interested in recording a country album together, to which Baker said yes. In 2024, Baker embarked on a tour of a handful of cities, having different openers each night. For one of the nights of the tour, Torres opened. Baker came out during her set to perform a new song, and Torres came out later in the night during Baker's set to perform another new song. In November 2024, Baker and Torres were added to Big Ears Festival, officially launching the project. The duo released the first single from the album, "Sugar in the Tank", in December and the second single, "Sylvia", in January alongside the album announcement.

== Track listing ==
All tracks are written by Julien Baker and Mackenzie Scott.

Send a Prayer My Way track listing
No.	Title	Length
1.	"Dirt"	4:37
2.	"The Only Marble I've Got Left"	2:45
3.	"Sugar in the Tank"	3:42
4.	"Bottom of a Bottle"	3:56
5.	"Downhill Both Ways"	3:21
6.	"No Desert Flower"	3:18
7.	"Tape Runs Out"	3:21
8.	"Off the Wagon"	3:35
9.	"Tuesday"	3:56
10.	"Showdown"	2:53
11.	"Sylvia"	2:20
12.	"Goodbye Baby"	2:13
Total length:		39:37

== Personnel ==
=== Julien Baker & Torres ===
- Julien Baker – vocals, acoustic guitar, production
- Mackenzie Scott – vocals, acoustic guitar, production

=== Additional contributors ===
- Sarah Tudzin – production, engineering (all tracks); drums (tracks 5, 11)
- Heba Kadry – mastering
- Trina Shoemaker – mixing
- Gory Smelley – engineering
- Sarah Jaffe – bass guitar
- Zöe Brecher – drums
- Aisha Burns – fiddle
- J.R. Bohannon – pedal steel guitar (tracks 1–10), Dobro guitar (11), acoustic guitar (12)
- Sarah Goldstone – piano (track 1), Hammond organ (3)
- Thor Harris – bongos (track 7)

== Charts ==
Chart performance for Send a Prayer My Way
Chart (2025)	Peak position
Belgian Albums (Ultratop Flanders)	197
Scottish Albums (Official Charts)	8
UK Album Downloads (Official Charts)	6
UK Independent Albums (Official Charts)	3
UK Country Albums (Official Charts)	1
US Americana/Folk Albums (Billboard)	16
US Independent Albums (Billboard)	34
