= Julien Baker & Torres =

American country music duo

- Genre: Country • alternative country
- Years active: 2024-present
- Label: Matador Records
- Members: Julien Baker, Torres

Julien Baker & Torres is an American country duo consisting of musicians Julien Baker and Torres.

== History ==
In June 2024, Baker announced a solo tour consisting of multi-night residencies in a handful of cities. For each tour date, Baker had a different opening act. At night one of her Webster Hall residency, Torres opened the show. During Torres' set, Baker came out to sing a new song alongside Torres'. Later that evening, during Baker's set, Torres' came out and the two sang another new song together. In November, the two announced festival appearances at Big Ears Festival and High Water Festival, along with the creation of a new website. The duo announced more festival appearances in the following weeks after their first announcement.

In December 2024, the duo were announced as the musical guest on the December 10th episode of The Tonight Show Starring Jimmy Fallon, where they performed a new song titled "Sugar in the Tank", which had first been performed at the Webster Hall show. The day of their "Tonight Show" appearance, the duo announced a show the following day at Mercury Lounge in New York City. At the show, the duo debuted a bunch of new songs in addition to covering both Songs: Ohia and Tim McGraw. The song was released on December 13, 2024 through Matador Records.

A month later, on January 29, 2025, the duo released another new song called "Sylvia", and announced their debut album Send a Prayer My Way, to be released on April 18, 2025. The album was released to positive reviews by critics. They embarked on a tour of the Southern United States after release; however, the tour was canceled shortly after beginning due to health reasons.

== Discography ==
=== Albums ===
- Send a Prayer My Way (2025)

=== Singles ===
Title	Year	Peak chart positions	Album
Title	Year	US AAA	Album
"Sugar in the Tank"	2025	10	Send a Prayer My Way
