= Lope and Antilope =

2014 studio album by Get The Blessing

Studio album by The Blessing
- Released: January 20, 2014
- Genre: Jazz rock
- Length: 41:00
- Label: Naim Jazz

The Blessing chronology
OCDC (2012)	Lope and Antilope (2014)	Astronautilus (2015)

Lope and Antilope is the fourth studio album by the Bristol based jazz rock quartet Get the Blessing, released in 2014.

The album was recorded in a pottery workshop in Pembrokeshire, a change sought by the band to escape the conventional recording process. Recording began with no songs written, thus the band mostly improvised over a period of four days.

== Reception ==
Professional ratings
Review scores
Source	Rating
The Guardian	4/5 stars
The Jazz Mann	4/5 stars
UK Vibe	4/5 stars

In a review for The Quietus, Sean Kitching called the album "excellent," and wrote: "The album's greatest strength is its warm, spacious and organic sound... its content is as much about the sense of space evoked as the notes themselves."

The Guardian's John Fordham stated: "Their strategy is a jazz horn sound derived from Ornette Coleman's unruly sax/trumpet harmonies, laid over the hooks and backbeats of rock – and here they do it with even more laid-back nonchalance than usual, and a wider sweep of sound effects... It's probably their best album yet, and the titles aren't bad either."

Ian Mann of The Jazz Mann commented: "Lope and Antilope is simultaneously Get The Blessing's most and least jazz record. Most because of its birth in improvisation, least because of its use of electronic textures and non jazz rhythms as the group edge closer to post rock, ambient and dance music. As such it's perhaps their least classifiable album to date, certainly the most interesting, and arguably the best."

Writing for UK Vibe, Tim Stenhouse stated that the album offers "an original take on music with intelligent and invariably catchy riffs with a creative use of both acoustic and electronic instrumentation. If the music is not always evident on the first hearing, then repeated listens do make for an enriching musical experience."

Matt R. Lohr of Jazz Times remarked: "This is as aesthetically exciting a jazz recording as any of the last decade, and its boundless entertainment value leaves no doubt that when Get the Blessing is in the house, it's their listeners who are indeed blessed."

In an article for Louder Than War, Philip Allen wrote: "This album is an incredible achievement in which there is not one bad aspect. A Masterpiece of temperance and understatement, a career defining moment in which we all fall in love with 'The Blessing'."

John Bungey of The Times stated that the album "curbs wilder, free jazz instincts for a series of mood pieces... And when they are not being enigmatic or teeth-threateningly loud, their music can be rather pretty."

The Northern Echo's Matt Westcott commented: "Lope and Antilope was recorded in a matter of days. This is in no way reflected by the end product which is classy, inventive and worth listening to... what, in the wrong hands, could so easily have resulted in a chaotic mulch of barely distinguishable sound is in fact an album to behold."

In a 2014 review for Bird is the Worm, Dave Sumner called the album "One of the best things released all year, and remarked: "Lope and Antilope is an album of songs. There is a structure built into everything, even during those moments when the group delivers melodic passages with an off-the-cuff sincerity that cuts to the bone."

== Track listing ==
1. Quiet - 5:56
2. Little Ease - 4:19
3. Corniche - 5:31
4. Antilope - 4:10
5. Luposcope - 3:09
6. Viking Death Moped - 2:37
7. Hope (For the Moment) - 4:33
8. Trope - 3:08
9. Lope - 4:26
10. Numbers - 3:08

== Personnel ==
- Jim Barr - Electric bass, bass V1, distortions, wah, delays
- Clive Deamer - Gretsch be-bop kit, stereo tambourine, barabrith
- Pete Judge - Trumpet, flugelhorn, piano, distortion, looping, filtering and delay
- Jake McMurchie - tenor saxophone, baritone saxophone, pitch-bend, bit-crush, ring mod and delay

=== Guest Personnel ===
- Adrian Utley - Additional guitar
- Tim Allen - Recording
