= Pink Silence =

Studio album by Cloth
- Released: April 25, 2025
- Length: 36:11
- Label: Rock Action
- Producer: Ali Chant

Cloth chronology
Secret Measure (2023)	Pink Silence (2025)

Singles from Pink Silence
- 1. "Polaroid" Released: 26 November 2024; 2. "Golden" Released: 13 February 2025

Pink Silence is the third studio album by Scottish siblings Rachael and Paul Swinton, under the band name, Cloth. It was released on 25 April 2025, through Rock Action, in CD, LP and digital formats.

The album, consisting of ten tracks with a total runtime of approximately thirty-six minutes, succeeds the duo's 2023 project, Secret Measure, and was produced by Ali Chant. "Golden" was released as the album's second single on 13 February 2025, following the release of the 2024 single, "Polaroid".

== Reception ==
Professional ratings
Review scores
Source	Rating
Clash	7/10 stars
Narc	4.5/5 stars
The Skinny	4/5 stars

Adam Clarke of The Skinny rated the album four stars, stating "His words of loss and heartbreak are carried by Rachael's serene, hushed vocals, ensuring that on Pink Silence, Cloth expand their sound while retaining their intimacy – ultimately they succeed in letting go."

Clash assigned it a rating of seven out of ten and remarked, "Where Secret Measure highlighted Cloth's capabilities as a duo, Pink Silence occupies a richer, more expansive space; more cinematic, yet still tangibly tender."

Narc rated it four and a half out of five, describing it as "an album of authentic ease and swirling effortlessly light lyrics, peppered with those dreamy depths of after-hours vibes."

== Track listing ==
All tracks are written by Paul Swinton and Rachel Swinton.

Pink Silence track listing
No.	Title	Length
1.	"Pink Silence"	3:19
2.	"Polaroid"	3:47
3.	"Stuck"	4:06
4.	"Golden"	3:42
5.	"The Cottage"	3:47
6.	"It's a Lot"	3:28
7.	"I Don't Think So"	3:26
8.	"Stones"	3:02
9.	"Burn"	3:58
10.	"Write It Down"	3:36
Total length:		36:11

== Personnel ==
Credits adapted from Tidal.

=== Cloth ===
- Paul Swinton – guitar (tracks 1–4, 6–10), bass guitar (2, 6, 9)
- Rachel Swinton – vocals, guitar (all tracks); bass guitar (1, 3, 4, 7, 10), percussion (3, 6, 7), piano (4, 5, 7)

=== Additional contributors ===
- Ali Chant – production, mixing (all tracks), percussion (1–3, 10), synthesizer (1, 2, 4, 7, 9), bass guitar (1, 5), piano (2, 3), guitar (4, 7), programming (5)
- Felix Davis – mastering
- Niklas Lueger – engineering
- Matt Brown – drums (1–4, 6–10), percussion (7)
- Adrian Utley – synthesizer (1, 3, 5, 9), guitar (1, 3, 7, 9)
- Stuart Braithwaite – guitar (1)
- Owen Pallett – ensemble (2, 5, 8–10)
