= Sprinter (album) =

Studio album by Torres
- Released: May 5, 2015
- Studios: Bridport, Bristol
- Genre: Rock
- Length: 45:12
- Label: Partisan
- Producer: Rob Ellis

Torres chronology
Torres (2013)	Sprinter (2015)	Three Futures (2017)

Sprinter is the second studio album by Torres, released May 5, 2015 on Partisan Records. The album was recorded in England and was influenced by Scott's upbringing in Georgia, United States. The album received mostly positive reviews upon release, with critics praising Scott's lyricism.

== Recording ==
=== Production ===
Sprinter was recorded in Bridport with co-producer Rob Ellis and in Bristol with Portishead member Adrian Utley. Scott and Ellis had kept in touch after the first time Torres performed in London, and Scott decided to choose Ellis as her producer when she was looking to make a new album. The album features contributions from Utley, Scanner and PJ Harvey bassist Ian Oliver.

=== Music and lyrics ===
The music on Sprinter was inspired by 1990s alternative rock. Artists that have been cited as influence on the album include Nirvana, Funkadelic and PJ Harvey. Scott's upbringing in Macon, Georgia, especially her experiences in the Baptist Church influenced the album's lyrics. The lyrics on Sprinter were also influenced by the writings of John Edward Williams, J. D. Salinger, John Donne and Joan Didion.

The title track, "Sprinter", touches upon Scott's past running track in high school and her desires to run away from her past. "A Proper Polish Welcome" was Scott's "attempt to rewrite the story of Noah and the Ark." Scott wrote "Son, You Are No Island" as a reaction to being betrayed by someone she really cared about, with Scott attempting to be in a position of power (specifically the Voice of God) over her betrayer. "The Exchange", the album's closing track, is about Scott's adopted mother who, like Scott, was also adopted.

== Reception ==
Professional ratings
Aggregate scores
Source	Rating
AnyDecentMusic?	7.9/10
Metacritic	81/100
Review scores
Source	Rating
AllMusic	3.5/5 stars
Consequence of Sound	A−
The Guardian	3/5 stars
The Irish Times	4/5 stars
NME	8/10
The Observer	4/5 stars
Pitchfork	8.0/10
PopMatters	9/10
Rolling Stone	3.5/5 stars
Uncut	8/10

Sprinter has received mostly positive reviews. On Metacritic, the album has a score of 81 out of 100, indicating "universal acclaim".

Paste's Zach Schonfeld praised album, writing "it already feels like these songs have been around for a long time, which is reasonable indication that they will be with us for a while." Philip Cosores of Consequence of Sound praised the Scott's lyrics, writing "Scott is only 24, but she writes with the courage of someone much older. She is already willing to bear the wisdom and insight that comes from her Southern Baptist roots — and from leaving them behind." In another positive review, Pitchfork's Jillian Mapes wrote "When Scott can find the right balance of these elements—dark, introspective, midtempo, highly distorted, and in the four to five-minute range—she hits a sweet spot, like on 'New Skin' and the album's title track."

In a mixed review, The Guardian's Tim Jonze praised the lyrics but criticized the music, writing "If the lyrics are revealing and off-kilter, the music is not always so. Producer Rob Ellis [..] helps hone Sprinter's 90s alt-rock sound, but it's a rather familiar one, and there's not always enough melody to help these intimate stories take flight."

=== Accolades ===
Publication	Accolade	Year	Rank
The A.V. Club	The 15 Best Albums of 2015	2015	10

== Track listing ==
1. "Strange Hellos" - 3:55
2. "New Skin" - 5:16
3. "Son, You Are No Island " - 4:28
4. "A Proper Polish Welcome " - 5:04
5. "Sprinter" - 4:44
6. "Cowboy Guilt" - 2:49
7. "Ferris Wheel" - 7:01
8. "The Harshest Light" - 4:07
9. "The Exchange" - 7:48

== Personnel ==
Credits adapted from AllMusic.

- B.J. Cole – Pedal steel
- Rob Ellis – drums, location recording, Moog synthesizer, percussion, producer, stylophone, synthesizer, background vocals
- Chris Hamilton – engineer, guitar, Moog synthesizer, programming, treatments
- Joe Lambert – mastering
- Ian Oliver – bass
- Casey Pierce – cover photo
- Scanner – synthesizer, treatments
- Mackenzie Scott – guitar, Lyricist, producer, synthesizer, vocals
- Adrian Utley – guitar, Moog synthesizer, Oberheim synthesizer, Temple Blocks
- Nicolas Vernhes – mixing

== Charts ==
Chart (2015)	Peak position
US Heatseekers Albums (Billboard)	20
