= Silver Tongue (album) =

Studio album by Torres
- Released: January 31, 2020
- Length: 34:31
- Label: Merge
- Producer: Mackenzie Scott

Torres chronology
Three Futures (2017)	Silver Tongue (2020)	Thirstier (2021)

Professional ratings
Aggregate scores
Source	Rating
AnyDecentMusic?	7.6/10
Metacritic	77/100
Review scores
Source	Rating
AllMusic	4/5 stars
Chicago Tribune	3/4 stars
Consequence of Sound	B+
DIY	4/5 stars
Exclaim!	8/10
MusicOMH	3.5/5 stars
NME	4/5 stars
Paste	8/10
Pitchfork	7.4/10
Under the Radar	8/10

Silver Tongue is the fourth studio album by American musician Torres. It was released on January 31, 2020, under Merge Records.

The first single from the album, "Good Scare" was released on October 29, 2019. The second single "Gracious Day" was released December 3, 2019.

== Critical reception ==
Silver Tongue was met with generally favorable reviews from critics. At Metacritic, which assigns a weighted average rating out of 100 to reviews from mainstream publications, this release received an average score of 77, based on 19 reviews. Aggregator Album of the Year gave the album a score of 78 based on 16 reviews.

=== Accolades ===
Accolades for Silver Tongue
Publication	Accolade	Rank	Ref.
Paste	Paste's 25 Best Albums of 2020 – Mid-Year	18	

== Track listing ==
All tracks are written by Mackenzie Scott.

Silver Tongue track listing
No.	Title	Length
1.	"Good Scare"	3:35
2.	"Last Forest"	3:44
3.	"Dressing America"	3:59
4.	"Records of Your Tenderness"	2:47
5.	"Two of Everything"	4:49
6.	"Good Grief"	5:03
7.	"A Few Blue Flowers"	3:50
8.	"Gracious Day"	2:34
9.	"Silver Tongue"	4:10

== Personnel ==
- Mackenzie Scott – vocalist, guitar, producer, drums, synthesizer
- Bryan Bisordi – drums
- Jorge Elbrecht – mixing
- Heba Kadry – mastering
- Erin Manning - synthesizer
- Jeff Zeigler - engineer
