= Resonators (band) =

British dub reggae band

Resonators are a British dub reggae band, based in Brighton. They have released three studio albums. Since 2009, Resonators have been fronted by female vocalists Faye Houston and Kassia Zermon, with Abraham Moughrabi (keys), Seth Tuffnell (drums), George Berrills (bass), Mike Shirley (guitar/vocals), Leroy Horns (sax), and Joe Atherton (trumpet).

== Discography ==
=== Albums ===
- Resonators (2010)
- The Constant (Wah Wah 45s, 2012)
- The Constant: Deluxe Edition (Wah Wah 45s, 2014) – additional dub versions of previously released tracks and two additional remixes
- Imaginary People (Wah Wah 45s, 2016)
