= Waking the Witch (band) =

British band

- Origin: Leeds, England
- Genres: Folk, rock
- Years active: 2003–2008
- Labels: Paramijo, Witch
- Past members: Rachel Goodwin; Patsy Matheson; Jools Parker; Becky Mills; Michelle Plum

Waking the Witch were a Leeds-based band, formed in 2003. After playing at several major festivals and releasing three albums, they split up in 2008.

== History ==
The band initially consisted of Rachel Goodwin, Patsy Matheson, Jools Parker, and Michelle Plum, with Becky Mills replacing Plum in 2005, all of whom also worked as solo artists, and they took their name from a song on the Kate Bush album Hounds of Love. All acoustic guitarists and vocalists, the band cited jazz, rock, and folk influences, as well as pop acts such as Coldplay and Kate Bush.

They received airplay from BBC disc jockeys such as Bob Harris, Janice Long, and Charlie Gillett, and recorded a sessions for Long's and Gillett's shows.

They appeared at several major UK festivals including Glastonbury, Trowbridge and Cambridge. They headlined the Holmfirth Festival of Folk in 2006.

They released three albums — Like Everybody (2004), Hands and Bridges (2005), and Boys from the Abattoir (2007). Boys from the Abbattoir featured guest contributions from former Big Country guitarist Bruce Watson and Claire "Fluff" Smith from The Incredible String Band. A live DVD was released in 2007.

Waking the Witch split up in 2008 after a farewell tour.

The four members subsequently returned to solo performances.

They reunited without Parker for a one-off performance in February 2010 at a fundraiser for the DEC's Haiti earthquake appeal.

== Discography ==
=== Albums ===
- Like Everybody (2004), Paramijo
- Hands and Bridges (2005), Witch
- Boys from the Abattoir (2007), Witch

=== DVD ===
- Live (2007), Voiceprint
