= Torres (musician) =

American singer-songwriter (born 1991)

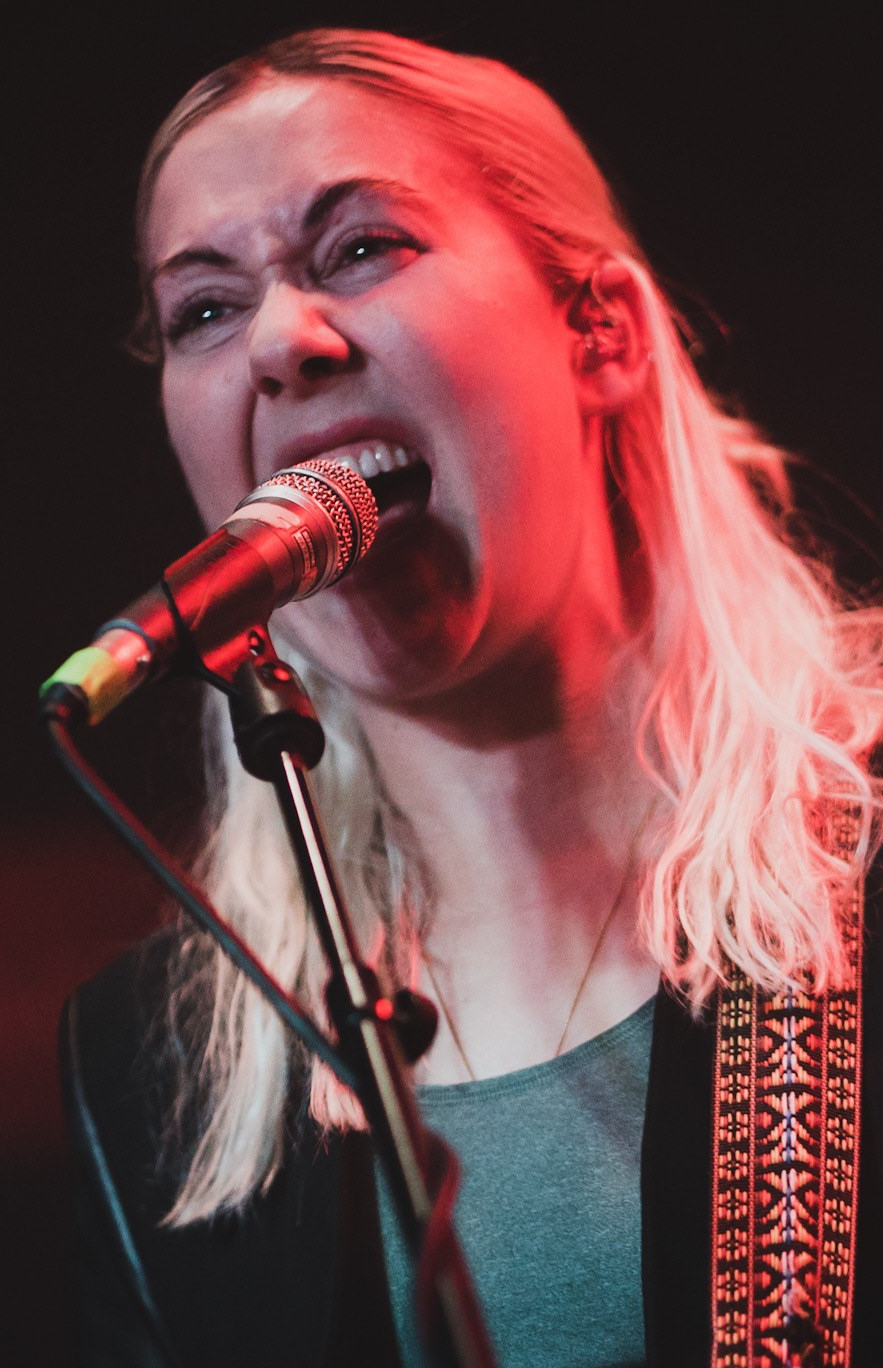
- Scott in 2017

Background information
- Born: Mackenzie Ruth Scott; January 23, 1991 (age 35)
- Genres: Indie rock
- Occupation: Singer-songwriter
- Years active: 2012–present
- Labels: Partisan; 4AD; Merge
- Member of: Julien Baker & Torres
- Spouse: Jenna Gribbon (m. 2022)
- Website: torresmusicofficial.com

Mackenzie Ruth Scott (born January 23, 1991), known professionally as Torres, is an American indie rock singer-songwriter.

== Early life and education ==
Mackenzie Ruth Scott was born on January 23, 1991, and adopted at birth by their birth mother's bible study teacher. They were raised in Macon, Georgia.

Brought up in a Christian home, Scott was the youngest of three, having a brother and a sister. At an early age, they learned how to play the flute and piano and sang in the children's choir at their Baptist church. Through The Phantom of the Opera, Scott soon became interested in musical theatre. They started singing in their school's productions. Scott began to perform in musicals, learned to play guitar, and started playing and singing hymns and at a nursing home.

Scott attended Belmont University in Nashville, Tennessee. They graduated in 2009 with a degree in songwriting, and also gained a minor in English literature.

== Career ==
=== Torres (2012–2014) ===
In July 2012, while still a student, Scott recorded their debut album Torres over a five-day session at Tony Joe White's home studio in Franklin, Tennessee, with engineer and producer Ryan McFadden. Following the album's release on February 8, 2013, they played their debut show as Torres in Nashville at The Basement. The album was digitally released on January 22, 2013, and received critical acclaim. In summer 2013, they moved to Bushwick, Brooklyn.

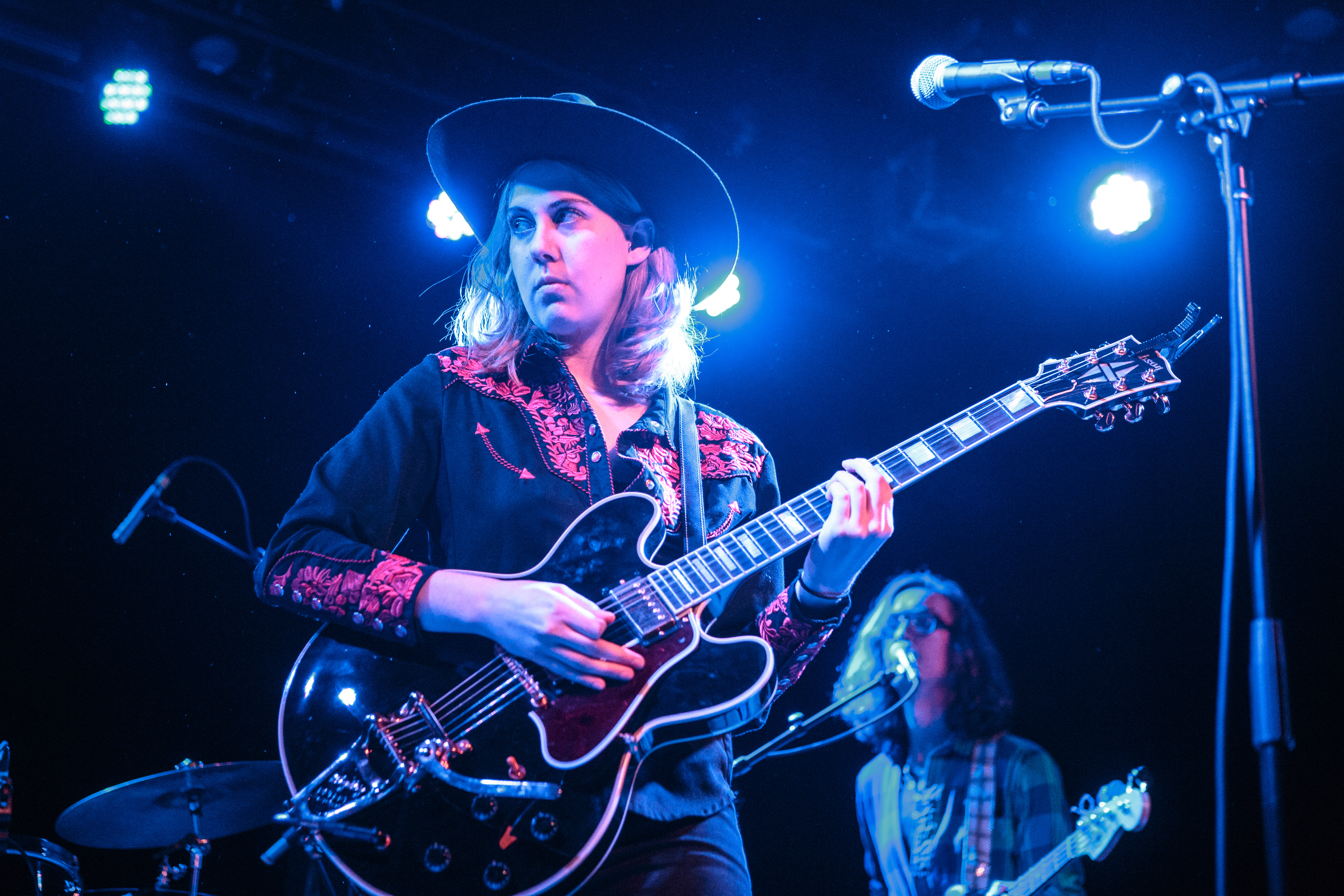
Scott performing in Cambridge, Massachusetts in 2014

Scott has toured extensively in the U.S. and Europe with a wide variety of musicians, including Lady Lamb the Beekeeper, Okkervil River, Sharon Van Etten, and Hamilton Leithauser. They appeared as a guest on Van Etten's 2014 album Are We There and released a single, "New Skin", through Weathervane Music in June 112014.

=== Sprinter (2015–2016) ===
Scott released their second album Sprinter on May 5, 2015, through Partisan Records. Unlike Torres, which was produced in Nashville, Sprinter was recorded in Dorset, England and produced by Rob Ellis. Scott described Sprinter as "something that would feel massive and heavy" with electronic elements, deliberate guitars and languid arrangements.

Scott toured the U.S. and Europe as a headliner for this album. They also opened for Garbage and Brandi Carlile, their early musical idol, in 2015, and joined Tegan and Sara for the group’s November 2016 tour.

=== Three Futures (2017) ===
Scott's third album Three Futures was released on September 29, 2017. It was once again produced by Rob Ellis. Production started in Stockport, England, and was completed in the same Dorset studio where Scott had worked on Sprinter. Three Futures takes inspiration from electropop, gothic industrial, and Krautrock. Scott also contributed a cover version of "Until I Die" to the Brandi Carlile charity compilation album Cover Stories.

=== Silver Tongue (2020) ===
Scott's fourth studio album Silver Tongue was released on January 31, 2020, via Merge Records. Pitchfork gave it a positive review saying "Tongue is both her most intimate and eclectic album thus far". "Dressing America" was selected as "Song of the Day" by Kevin Cole, the host of The Afternoon Show on KEXP-FM.

=== Thirstier (2021) ===
Scott's fifth album, Thirstier, was released on July 30, 2021.

=== What an Enormous Room (2024) ===
Scott's sixth album, What an Enormous Room, was released on January 26, 2024.

=== Send a Prayer My Way (2025) ===
A joint production with Julien Baker, Send a Prayer My Way was released on April 18, 2025.

== Influences ==
From a young age, Scott has been influenced by Broadway theatre. Their live performances are known to be very dramatic, and Scott believes this stems from their early experiences with musical theater. Scott has cited Brandi Carlile and Fleetwood Mac as major influences on their style. Scott writes poetry and short stories, and they have cited Sylvia Plath as both their favorite author and an inspiration for much of their work.

== Critical reception ==
Their self-titled album Torres received favorable reviews from Beats Per Minute, Pitchfork, and Metacritic. Music website Pitchfork Media named Torres's debut single, "Honey", best new track, describing it as "an arena-rock moment happening on an empty stage […] with its slow-burn intensity and coiled energy". Following the release of the album, Pitchfork gave the debut album an 8.1 rating calling the record "an overwhelming rush of feeling […] that connects with throat-seizing immediacy".

Torres' second album also received many positive reviews. On Metacritic, the album has a score of 81 out of 100, indicating "Universal acclaim". Consequence of Sound praised that Scott's lyrics, "writes with the courage of someone much older. [They are] already willing to bear the wisdom and insight that comes from [their] Southern Baptist roots—and from leaving them behind" and gave the album an A−. Pitchfork also praised the album writing "When Scott can find the right balance of these elements—dark, introspective, mid-tempo, highly distorted, and in the four to five-minute range— [they hit] a sweet spot, like on 'New Skin' and the album's title track".

Torres' third album Three Futures, released on September 29, 2017, was met with positive reviews. Rolling Stone gave the album 3.5 out of 5 stars. The Rolling Stone describes the album as "offering conflicted images of emotional and physical release over bracing industrial-rock textures". The AV Club also praised Three Futures describing it as "hazily fascinating, flowing naturally through its various peaks and valleys, and it succeeds in Scott's goal of being truly immersive listening", while rating the album an A−. Consequence of Sound gave the album a B+, describing Scott's ability to pursue new musical directions "with poise and confidence…" DIY also awarded Three Futures 4 out of 5 stars and noted Scott takes a step forward without forgetting what made [their] previous albums successful, by venturing into "previously little-trodden ground in sumptuous new ways".

== Personal life ==
In 2017, Scott met American painter Jenna Gribbon at a bar in the East Village, and by 2019, they had moved into a "live-work space" in Bushwick, Brooklyn together. They describe an experience of meeting Gribbon in a dream before they met in person. Gribbon proposed to Scott in October 2020, and they married in November 2022.

On May 1, 2021, Scott came out as non-binary.

== Discography ==
=== Studio albums ===
- Torres (2013)
- Sprinter (2015)
- Three Futures (2017)
- Silver Tongue (2020)
- Thirstier (2021)
- What an Enormous Room (2024)

=== Live albums ===
- Live in Berlin (2020)

=== Other releases ===
- "Torres" b/w "Motel Beds" (2014) (Record Store Day)
- "Until I Die"

=== Singles ===
- "Good Scare" (2020)
- "Gracious Day" (2020)
