= Los Albertos =

UK musical group

- Origin: Brighton, England, UK
- Genres: Ska; Punk; Funk; Dub
- Years active: 2002–present
- Members: Tim Herman; Mark Crawford; Martin Andrews; Des Crawley; Chez Harper-Grimble; Adam Futcher
- Past members: Nic Tribe; Jim Gallagher; Tom Livingstone
- Website: losalbertos.uk

Los Albertos are an English, Brighton-based, ska punk band.

While their guitar sound ranges from chicken scratch to Carlos Santana, and the horns veer from wall of brass to kelzma reediness in their riotous, joyous sound, lyrics cast the net far and wide.

The band has produced three albums and have toured Europe and the UK, and played at numerous festivals including Glastonbury Festival. Some professional producers such as Al Scott who also worked with English rock band, The Levellers have worked with the band. In January 2009, Nic Tribe, the band's bassist decided to leave the band to pursue his own direction. The band later replaced Nic with Jim Gallagher briefly, before full-time member Adam Futcher joined up.

== Albums ==
=== Los Bop ===
Released 2004

Los Bop album cover.

==== Tracks ====
- 1. "Mr. Chip"
- 2. "Pikey Killed My Goldfish"
- 3. "Bei Mir Bist Du Schon"
- 4. "Cheeky Rascal"
- 5. "Los Bop"
- 6. "Sweet"
- 7. "Stompin' At The Savoy"
- 8. "Grange Hill"
- 9. "The Bossman"
- 10. "Beer Panic"
- 11. "Last Bop"

=== Information Overload ===
Released 2006

==== Tracks ====
- 1. "Information Overload"
- 2. "The Nice Man from Next Door"
- 3. "CeleBrity"
- 4. "Beer Panic" (newer version)
- 5. "Leavin' The Band"
- 6. "Friends"
- 7. "Scientist"
- 8. "Heal"
- 9. "Resist"
- 10. "Song for Sylvie"
- 11. "Transcend Dental Medication"
- 12. "Spaghetti Weston Super Mare"
- 13. "Don't Forget Your Giraffe" (hidden, bonus track)

=== Dish It Up ===
Released 2009

Dish It Up album cover.

==== Tracks ====
- 1. "Carry On (Regardless)"
- 2. "Dish It Out"
- 3. "Leslie"
- 4. "Celebration"
- 5. "Phase"
- 6. "Sleep"
- 7. "Saint"
- 8. "Call in Sick"
- 9. "Julie"
- 10. "M4"
- 11. "Friends 2"

=== This Is A Serious Party EP ===
Released 20 May 2016 on Brightonsfinest Presents

==== Tracks ====
- 1. "Fall From Grace"
- 2. "Itchy Feet"
- 3. "Money"
- 4. "Sweet Dreams"
