= Spiro (band) =

British instrumental musical group

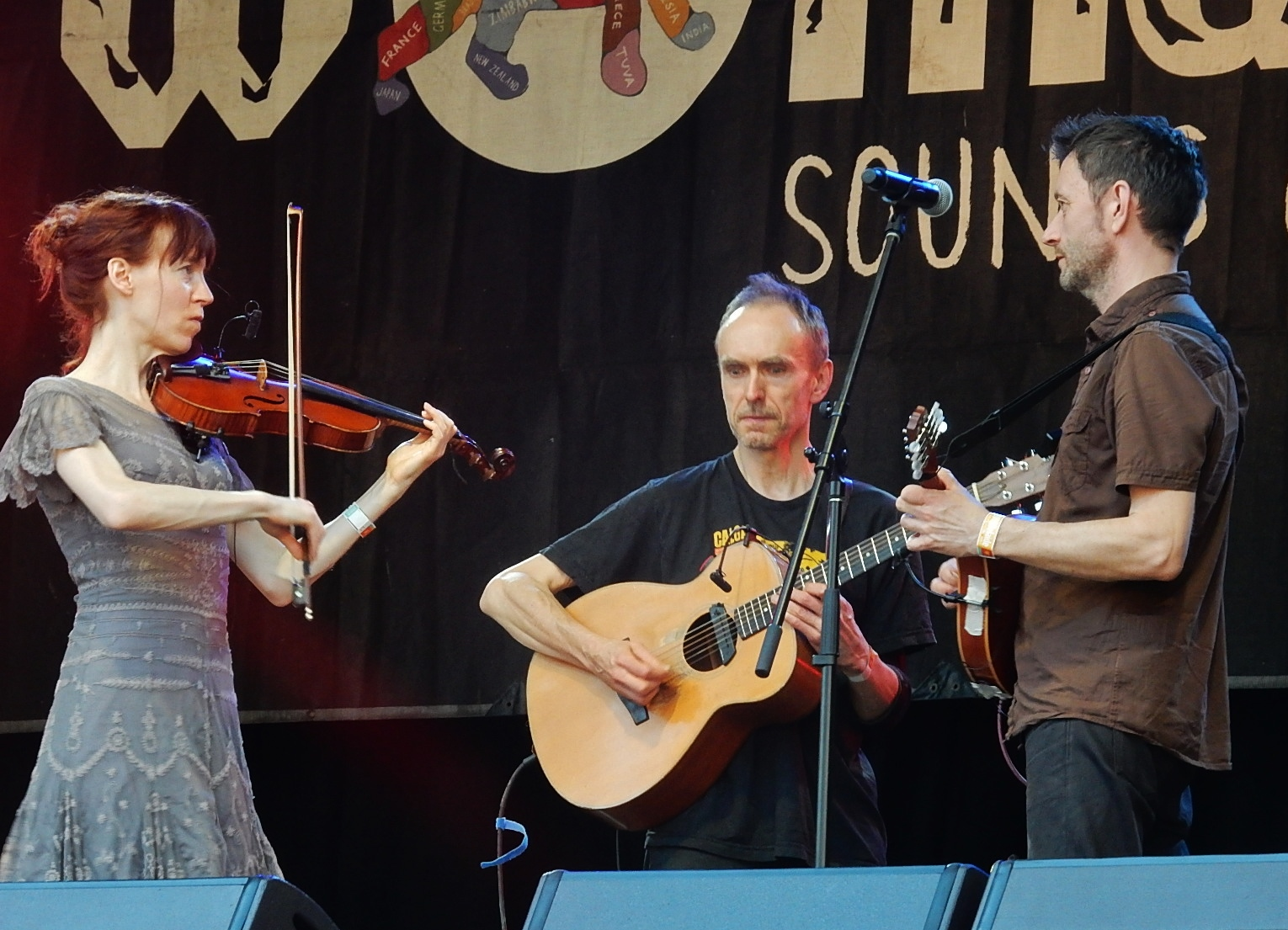
- WOMAdelaide 2016

Background information
- Origin: Bristol, England
- Genres: Contemporary acoustic, instrumental, minimalist, dance, folk
- Years active: 1993–present
- Label: Real World Records
- Members: Jane Harbour; Alex Vann; Jason Sparkes; Jon Hunt
- Website: Spiromusic.com

Spiro is an English instrumental musical group based in Bristol, England, consisting of Jane Harbour (violin, viola) Alex Vann (mandolin) Jason Sparkes (piano accordion) and Jon Hunt (guitar). To date they have released four albums on the UK label Real World Records.

== History ==
The band was formed in 1993 by violinist Jane Harbour, who quickly became the group's main composer and whose classical and electronica influences met with the punk influences of Vann and Hunt. Their early experiments centred around reworking traditional folk tunes, particularly those of the North of England, but Harbour's growing fascination with minimalist systems began to impact on the group and were evident by the time of the independently released Pole Star (1997), which fused both influences. The album was critically well received, and the band continued to play live, including writing and performing for theatre. However no further albums were released until the BBC's use of several Pole Star tracks brought them to the attention of manager Alan James and Real World Records, for whom they have recorded three further studio albums, Lightbox (2009), Kaleidophonica (2012) and Welcome Joy and Welcome Sorrow (2015). The latter two in particular largely feature original melodies and more intricate composition. Real World also re-released Pole Star (2014), a vinyl-only compilation album Repeater (2016) and a mini-album, The Vapourer (2013), with live recordings by the group and Moog versions of two of their compositions by Portishead's Adrian Utley. The band have toured internationally, and in 2016 received nominations for the BBC Folk Awards and Songlines Awards.

Harbour's solo work included writing for theatre, live film and TV, and for other ensembles including the experimental project The Small Mammal Mirror. Her orchestral work Kynde, a BBC Radio 3 commission, was performed live on Radio 3 by the BBC Concert Orchestra and the BBC Singers on 31 March 2017, conducted by Martin Yates.

== Members ==
- Jane Harbour (violin, viola; 1993 to present)
- Alex Vann (mandolin; 1993 to present)
- Jason Sparkes (accordion; 1993 to present)
- Jon Hunt (acoustic guitar; 1993 to present)
- Dave Thorogood (bagpipes; 1993)

== Recordings ==
- The Famous Five (recorded as 'The Famous Five') (self-released limited-edition cassette, 1993)
- Lost in Fishponds (recorded as 'The Famous Five') (CD, Uncle, 1994)
- Pole Star (Uncle, 1997)
- Lightbox (Real World Records, 2009)
- Kaleidophonica (Real World Records, 2012)
- The Vapourer (with Adrian Utley, Real World Records, 2013)
- Welcome Joy and Welcome Sorrow (Real World Records, 2015)
- Repeater (Real World Records, 2016)
