= Granger Smith discography =

- Studio albums: 11
- EPs: 2
- Soundtrack albums: 1
- Live albums: 2
- Singles: 23
- Music videos: 27

Granger Smith is an American country music artist. His discography comprises eleven studio albums, two live albums, two extended plays and 23 singles.

== Albums ==
=== Studio albums ===
Title	Album details	Peak chart positions					Sales
Title	Album details	US	US Country	US Indie	AUS	CAN	Sales
Waiting on Forever	Release date: November 30, 1999; Label: Granger Smith	—	—	—	—	—	
Memory Rd.	Release date: 2004; Label: Granger Smith	—	—	—	—	—	
Pockets of Pesos	Release date: May 11, 2005; Label: Granger Smith	—	—	—	—	—	
Livin' Like a Lonestar	Release date: October 6, 2006; Label: Granger Smith	—	—	—	—	—	
Don't Listen to the Radio	Release date: June 30, 2009; Label: Granger Smith	—	—	—	—	—	
Poets & Prisoners	Release date: April 12, 2011; Label: Pioneer Music	—	—	—	—	—	
Dirt Road Driveway	Release date: April 16, 2013; Label: Pioneer Music/Thirty Tigers	48	15	11	—	—	US: 69,000
Remington	Release date: March 4, 2016; Label: Wheelhouse	12	3	1	68	41	US: 81,200
When the Good Guys Win	Release date: October 27, 2017; Label: Wheelhouse	29	2	4	—	—	US: 56,300
Country Things Vol. 1	Release date: September 25, 2020; Label: Wheelhouse	83	13	11	—	—	US: 32,000
Country Things Vol. 2	Release Date: November 27, 2020; Label: Wheelhouse	83	13	11	—	—	US: 32,000
Moonrise	Release Date: November 18, 2022; Label: Wheelhouse	—	—	—	—	—	US: 4,350
"—" denotes releases that did not chart

== Live albums ==
Title	Album details
Live at the Chicken	Release date: February 14, 2012; Label: Granger Smith
Like A River - The Farewell Tour	Release Date: October 18, 2024; Label: Pioneer Entertainment

== Soundtrack albums ==
Title	Album details	Peak chart positions		
Title	Album details	US	US Country	US Indie
They Were There, A Hero's Documentary	Release date: November 30, 2018; Label: Wheelhouse	200	23	4

== Extended plays ==
Title	Album details	Peak chart positions		
Title	Album details	US	US Country	US Indie
We Bleed Maroon	Release date: November 30, 2006; Label: Granger Smith	—	—	—
4x4	Release date: May 4, 2015; Label: Wheelhouse	51	6	4
"—" denotes releases that did not chart

== Singles ==
Year	Single	Peak chart positions					Certifications	Album
Year	Single	US Country	US Country Airplay	US	CAN Country	CAN	Certifications	Album
2008	"Colorblind"	—	—	—	—	—		Livin' Like a Lonestar
2009	"Don't Listen to the Radio"	—	—	—	—	—		Don't Listen to the Radio
2009	"Gypsy Rain"	—	—	—	—	—		Don't Listen to the Radio
2010	"I Almost Am"	—	—	—	—	—		Don't Listen to the Radio
2010	"Superstitious 17"	—	—	—	—	—		Don't Listen to the Radio
2011	"5 More Minutes"	—	—	—	—	—		Don't Listen to the Radio
2011	"Sleeping on the Interstate"	—	—	—	—	—		Poets & Prisoners
2011	"I'm Wearing Black"	—	—	—	—	—		Poets & Prisoners
2012	"Letters to London"	—	—	—	—	—		Poets & Prisoners
2012	"That's What I Do with It"	—	—	—	—	—		—N/a
2012	"We Do It in a Field"	—	—	—	—	—		Dirt Road Driveway
2013	"Silverado Bench Seat"	—	—	—	—	—		Dirt Road Driveway
2013	"Miles and Mud Tires"	—	—	—	—	—		Dirt Road Driveway
2014	"If Money Didn't Matter"	—	—	—	—	—		Dirt Road Driveway
2014	"Bury Me in Blue Jeans"	—	—	—	—	—		Dirt Road Driveway
2015	"Backroad Song"	4	1	49	2	69	RIAA: Gold	Remington
2016	"If the Boot Fits"	14	6	80	9	40		Remington
2017	"Happens Like That"	18	13	— (Note: "Happens Like That" did not enter the Billboard Hot 100, but peaked at number 12 on the Bubbling Under Hot 100 Singles chart.)	32	—	RIAA: Gold	When the Good Guys Win
2018	"You're in It"	41	36	—	—	—		When the Good Guys Win
2019	"That’s Why I Love Dirt Roads"	—	50	—	—	—		Country Things, Vol. 1
2021	"Hate You Like I Love You"	—	—	—	—	—		Country Things, Vol. 1
2022	"Country Music, Girls and Trucks" (with High Valley)	—	—	—	6	87		Way Back
"—" denotes releases that did not chart

== Other charted and certified songs ==
Year	Single	Peak positions	Certifications	Album
Year	Single	US Country	Certifications	Album
2013	"The Country Boy Song" (featuring Earl Dibbles Jr.)	—	RIAA: Gold	Dirt Road Driveway
2015	"City Boy Stuck" (featuring Earl Dibbles Jr.)	47		4x4
2016	"Merica" (featuring Earl Dibbles Jr.)	48		Remington
"—" denotes releases that did not chart

== Music videos ==
Year	Video	Director
2009	"Don't Listen to the Radio"	M. Andrew Barrera
2009	"Gypsy Rain"	M. Andrew Barrera
2010	"I Almost Am"	M. Andrew Barrera
2010	"B24"	M. Andrew Barrera
2011	"5 More Minutes"	M. Andrew Barrera
2011	"Sleeping on the Interstate"	—N/a
2011	"I'm Wearing Black"	M. Andrew Barrera
2011	"Red Dirt"	Tyler Smith
2012	"Oxygen"	Tyler Smith
2012	"That's What I Do with It"	Jacob Ryan Hamilton
2013	"Silverado Bench Seat"	Brian Lazzaro
2013	"Miles and Mud Tires"	Brian Lazzaro
2014	"If Money Didn't Matter"	—N/a
2014	"Bury Me in Blue Jeans"	Paul De La Cerda
2016	"Backroad Song"	Chris Hicky
2016	"5 More Minutes"	—N/a
2016	"If the Boot Fits"	Paul De La Cerda
2016	"Tractor"	—N/a
2017	"Happens Like That"	TK McKamy
2018	"We Got It"	—N/a
2018	"You're in It"	Mason Dixon
2020	"That's Why I Love Dirt Roads"	TK McKamy
2021	"Hate You Like I Love You"	TK McKamy
