= Rachel Loy =

American singer-songwriter

- Origin: Austin, Texas, US
- Genres: Indie
- Occupations: Musician, songwriter
- Instruments: Bass guitar, singing
- Labels: Epic; Nukleuz; Mega Sparkle
- Website: rachelloymusic.com

Rachel Loy is an American bass player, songwriter, and indie recording artist, originally from Austin, Texas. Loy released the song "The Same Man," on Sony while still studying at Berklee College of Music. The song is an account of a friend serving in Iraq. Her albums include Love the Mess (2005), Being Little (2006), and Tongue and Teeth (2007).

In 2008 she moved to Nashville, Tennessee and began playing bass on the road and in the studio. She has recorded with country stars Miranda Lambert, Brothers Osborne, Vince Gill, Willie Nelson, Dolly Parton, Dierks Bentley, Toby Keith, Brett Eldredge, Charlie Worsham, Allison Moorer, Granger Smith, and many others. She has performed live with Kenny Chesney, Garth Brooks, Carrie Underwood, Alan Jackson, Darius Rucker, Hank Williams Jr, Jason Aldean, Trisha Yearwood, Elvis Costello, Keith Richards, Steve Jordan, Post Malone, Rodney Crowell, Tanya Tucker, Chris Isaak, Eddie Vedder, and many others.

In 2025, she was nominated for an Academy of Country Music Award for Bass Player of the Year.

== Discography ==
=== Selected Recording Discography ===
Year	Artist	Album	Instrument
2025	Ella Langley	Choosin' Texas	Bass
2024	Miranda Lambert	Postcards from Texas	Bass, Vocals, Engineer
2021	Charlie Worsham	Sugarcane	Bass
2020	Granger Smith	Country Things, Vol. 2	Bass
2020	Granger Smith	Country Things, Vol. 1	Bass
2018	Catherine McGrath	Talk of This Town	Bass
2018	Vince Gill	Muscle Shoals: Small Town, Big Sound	Bass
2018	Bri Bagwell	In My Defense	Bass, Vocals, Composer
2018	Various	Dancehall Dreamin': A Tribute to Pat Green	Vocals
2017	Granger Smith	When the Good Guys Win	Bass
2017	Various	The Music of Nashville: Session 5, Vol 3	Bass
2017	Willie Nelson	God's Problem Child	Bass
2016	Dolly Shine	Walkabout	Vocals, Vocal Production
2016	Brothers Osborne	Pawn Shop	Bass
2016	Hannah Kerr	Overflow	Bass
2015	William Clark Green	Ringling Road	Vocals
2015	Allison Moorer	Down to Believing	Bass
2015	Toby Keith	35 MPH Town	Bass
2014	Adam Hood	Welcome to the Big World	Bass, Vocals
2014	Jim Lauderdale	I'm a Song	Bass
2013	Scotty McCreery	See You Tonight	Bass
2013	Katie Armiger	Fall Into Me	Bass
2013	Brett Eldredge	Bring You Back	Bass
