= GLAAD Media Award for Outstanding Breakthrough Music Artist =

Annual US music award

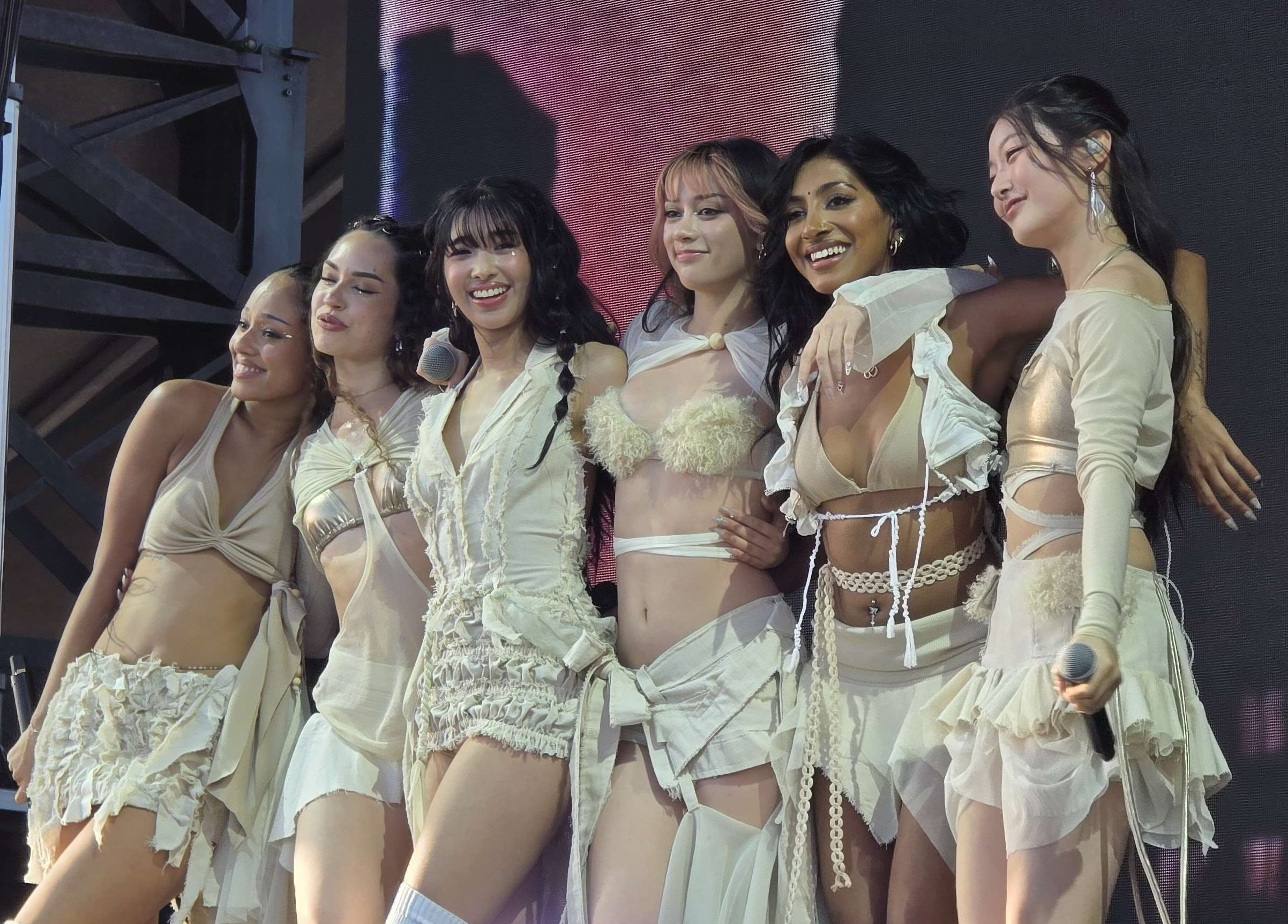
- 2026 recipient: Katseye
- Awarded for: Excellence in music by LGBTQ people or allies
- Venue: Varies
- Country: United States
- Presented by: GLAAD
- First award: 2021; 5 years ago
- 2026 winner: Katseye

The GLAAD Media Award for Outstanding Breakthrough Music Artist is an annual award honoring musicians who use songs, music videos and live performances to accelerate LGBTQ acceptance. The artists may be LGBTQ or allies. Artists are eligible who have released a full-length or EP-length album, or single sold through a major retail or online music store. In addition to the music itself, media interviews, public statements and other information may be considered when selecting nominees and award recipients. It is one of several categories of the GLAAD Media Awards presented by GLAAD, a US non-governmental media monitoring organization founded in 1985 (formerly called the Gay & Lesbian Alliance Against Defamation) at ceremonies in New York, Los Angeles and San Francisco between March and June.

The category was first presented at the 32nd GLAAD Media Awards in 2021 and is a companion to the GLAAD Media Award for Outstanding Music Artist. The inaugural recipient of the award was rapper Chika for her EP Industry Games. In the first two years of the category, artists were nominated for a specific album/EP however, as of the 34th GLAAD Media Awards, artists are instead nominated for their work as a whole.

For a music artist to be eligible, they must have achieved a breakthrough in the music industry by releasing an album or extended play during the eligibility period, and have it be sold in a major record shop or digital music store. The artist must also, through their music and live performances, have made a "significant impact on LGBTQ visibility and acceptance", with interviews and public statements also being taken into consideration. Artists nominated for Outstanding Breakthrough Music Artist cannot be nominated for Outstanding Music Artist in the same year.

Since its inception, the award has been given to 5 music artists. At the 36th GLAAD Media Awards in 2025, the award was given to Durand Bernarr.

== Winners and nominees ==
Table key
‡	Indicates the winner

=== 2020s ===
2020s winners and nominees
Award year	Artist	Album	Label	Ref(s).
2021 (32nd)	Chika ‡	Industry Games	Warner	
2021 (32nd)	Arca	Kick I	XL	
2021 (32nd)	Fletcher	The S(ex) Tapes	Capitol	
2021 (32nd)	Keiynan Lonsdale	Rainbow Boy		
2021 (32nd)	Kidd Kenn	Child's Play	Island	
2021 (32nd)	Orville Peck	Show Pony	Columbia / Sub Pop	
2021 (32nd)	Phoebe Bridgers	Punisher	Dead Oceans	
2021 (32nd)	Rina Sawayama	Sawayama	Dirty Hit / Avex Trax	
2021 (32nd)	Trixie Mattel	Barbara	Producer Entertainment Group / ATO	
2021 (32nd)	Victoria Monét	Jaguar	Tribe	
2022 (33rd)	Lily Rose ‡	Stronger Than I Am	—N/a	
2022 (33rd)	Arlo Parks	Collapsed in Sunbeams	—N/a	
2022 (33rd)	Asiahn	The Interlude	—N/a	
2022 (33rd)	Girl in Red	If I Could Make It Go Quiet	—N/a	
2022 (33rd)	Jake Wesley Rogers	Pluto	—N/a	
2022 (33rd)	Japanese Breakfast	Jubilee	—N/a	
2022 (33rd)	Joy Oladokun	In Defense of My Own Happiness	—N/a	
2022 (33rd)	Lauren Jauregui	Prelude	—N/a	
2022 (33rd)	Lucy Dacus	Home Video	—N/a	
2022 (33rd)	Vincint	There Will Be Tears	—N/a	
2023 (34th)	Dove Cameron ‡		—N/a	
2023 (34th)	Brooke Eden		—N/a	
2023 (34th)	Doechii		—N/a	
2023 (34th)	Dreamer Isioma		—N/a	
2023 (34th)	Ethel Cain		—N/a	
2023 (34th)	Isaac Dunbar		—N/a	
2023 (34th)	Jordy		—N/a	
2023 (34th)	Omar Apollo		—N/a	
2023 (34th)	Reneé Rapp		—N/a	
2023 (34th)	Steve Lacy		—N/a	
2024 (35th)	David Archuleta ‡		Archie Music	
2024 (35th)	Chappell Roan		Atlantic Records / Island Records	
2024 (35th)	Fancy Hagood		Fancy Hagood Enterprises	
2024 (35th)	G Flip		Future Classic	
2024 (35th)	Ice Spice		10K Projects / Capitol Records	
2024 (35th)	Iniko		Columbia Records	
2024 (35th)	Jade LeMac		Artista Records	
2024 (35th)	The Scarlet Opera		Perta / Silent Records	
2024 (35th)	Slayyyter		FADER Label	
2024 (35th)	UMI		Keep Cool / RCA	
2025 (36th)	Durand Bernarr ‡		DSing Records	
2025 (36th)	Beabadoobee		Dirty Hit	
2025 (36th)	The Blessed Madonna		Major Recordings / Warner Record	
2025 (36th)	Gigi Perez		Gigi Perez PS / Island	
2025 (36th)	The Last Dinner Party		Island Records	
2025 (36th)	Medium Build		Island Records	
2025 (36th)	Michaela Jaé		TribeDisciples	
2025 (36th)	Remi Wolf		Island Records	
2025 (36th)	Villano Antillano		La Buena Fortuna Music	
2025 (36th)	Young Miko		Wave Music Group / Capitol Records	
2026 (37th)	Katseye ‡		—N/a	
2026 (37th)	Amaarae		—N/a	
2026 (37th)	Chris Housman		—N/a	
2026 (37th)	Destin Conrad		—N/a	
2026 (37th)	Eli		—N/a	
2026 (37th)	Frankie Grande		—N/a	
2026 (37th)	Guitarricadelafuente		—N/a	
2026 (37th)	Shygirl		—N/a	
2026 (37th)	Snow Wife		—N/a	
2026 (37th)	Wet Leg		—N/a	
