= 4/4 =

4/4 may refer to:

- 4/4 time
- April 4
- 4/4 (EP series)

== See also ==
- Four by four (disambiguation)
