= Stage Girl =

Studio album by Eli
- Released: October 31, 2025
- Length: 54:59
- Labels: Zelig Music; RCA

Singles from Stage Girl
- 1. "Marianne" Released: May 30, 2025; 2. "Girl of Your Dreams" Released: June 20, 2025; 3. "Like a Girl" Released: August 27, 2025; 4. "All at Once" Released: September 26, 2025

Singles from Stage Girl (Not a Dream Anymore)
- 1. "Glitter" Released: December 5, 2025; 2. "Feel Your Rain" Released: March 27, 2026; 3. "F**k the DJ" Released: May 22, 2026

Stage Girl is the debut studio album by American singer Eli. It was released on October 31, 2025, under Zelig Music and RCA Records. Incorporating elements of pop and R&B, Stage Girl explores themes of love, gender, self-acceptance, and belonging. The album received a placement on Vogue's Best 45 Albums of 2025 list and a nomination for Outstanding Breakthrough Music Artist at the 37th GLAAD Media Awards.

== Music and theme ==
Stage Girl combines pop and R&B elements, exploring themes of love, gender, self-acceptance, and belonging.

== Release and promotion ==
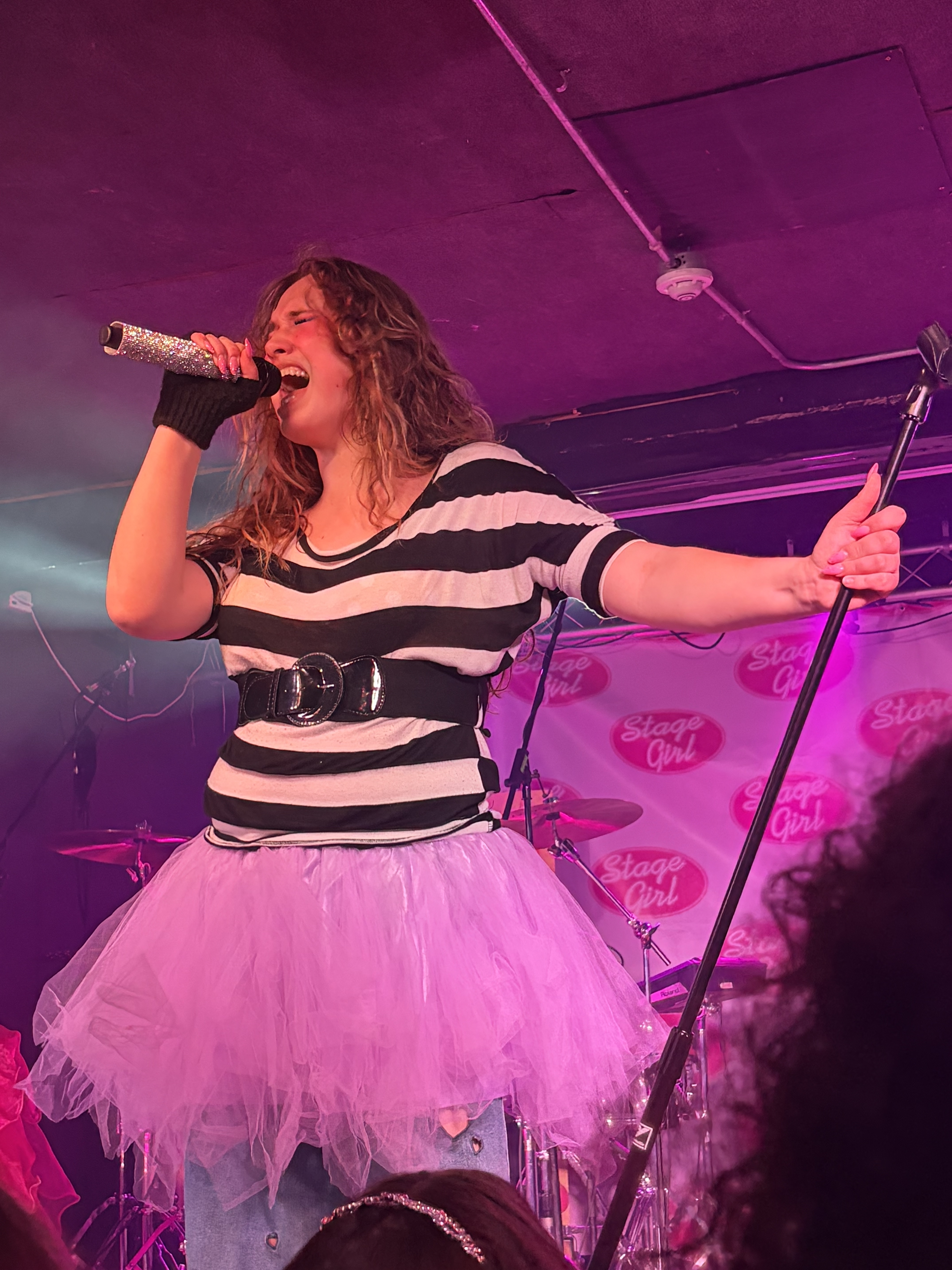
Eli performing in Toronto

After achieving moderate viral success on TikTok before its release, Stage Girl's lead single "Marianne" was released on May 30, 2025. The following month, Eli released "Girl of Your Dreams" as part of a self-dubbed "tringle" that also included "Fortunately 4 U" and "God Bless the BFA". The third single "Like a Girl" was released in August, with fourth and final single "All at Once" arriving in September 26. Following the release of Stage Girl in October, Eli began teasing the release of "Glitter". It was released on December 5, promoted by a fan event in New York City. At the end of her tour, titled Eli Is The Next Stage Girl Tour, in March 2026, she released the single "Feel Your Rain".

In an interview with Vogue, Eli announced a deluxe edition of Stage Girl, subtitled Not a Dream Anymore. Including six new songs, it was released on May 22, 2026. On April 30, Swedish singer Zara Larsson released a remix of her single "Crush" featuring Eli, as a part of her Midnight Sun: Girls Trip deluxe remix album. This track was later added on to the deluxe edition of Stage Girl, serving as the third track.

=== Live performances ===
Eli announced the Eli Is The Next Stage Girl Tour on January 16, 2026. The tour spanned ten dates across the United States and Canada during March 2026, and openers were selected through the "Are You The Next Stage Girl?" social media competition. In February, Eli opened for Sam Smith at the Castro Theatre in San Francisco and performed a 3-night concert residency called "Eli: The One Woman Show" at the Bob Baker Marionette Theater in Los Angeles.

On July 21, Eli announced a tour for the deluxe album titled "Strange Girl: Live on Stage".

== Critical reception ==
The album received positive reviews. Jacob Gardner for The Washington Post stated: "At the end of Stage Girl, Eli's persona is more than a character; it is a philosophy. Pop music can be transformative. Identity can be playful without being shallow. Spectacle can be profound. And when the final note hits, you step out of the dressing room a little braver, a little more unashamed, a little more yourself." Stage Girl (Not a Dream Anymore) received a score of 7.2 on Pitchfork.

Stage Girl was placed on Vogue's 45 Best Albums of 2025, and received a nomination for Outstanding Breakthrough Music Artist at the 37th GLAAD Media Awards.

== Track listing ==
All tracks are written by Eli, Mike Wise, and Sean Kennedy, except where noted.

Stage Girl track listing
No.	Title	Writer(s)	Length
1.	"Stars (Lullabye)"		2:24
2.	"Girl of Your Dreams"		3:10
3.	"Marianne"	Eli, Jason Vance Harris	3:10
4.	"Falsetto"	Eli, Harris, Tom Brocker	3:11
5.	"I Wish I Was a Girl"	Eli, Harris	2:58
6.	"Sunny"	Eli	1:17
7.	"Like a Girl"	Eli, Wise, Aver Ray	4:21
8.	"All at Once"		2:57
9.	"iTouch (Da Da)"	Eli, Jasper Harris, Megan Bülow	2:59
10.	"Somebody I'm Not"		3:29
Total length:			29:59

Stage Girl (Not a Dream Anymore) track listing
No.	Title	Writer(s)	Length
1.	"F**k the DJ"		2:58
2.	"Stars (Lullabye)"		2:24
3.	"Crush (Girls Trip)" (with Zara Larsson)	Eli, Zara Larsson, Helena Gao, Uzoechi Osisioma Emenike, Margo Wildman, Kevin Hickey, Ethan Ayer	3:21
4.	"Girl of Your Dreams"		3:10
5.	"Nobody's Girl"		3:16
6.	"Marianne"	Eli, Jason Vance Harris	3:10
7.	"Falsetto"	Eli, Harris, Tom Brocker	3:11
8.	"I Wish I Was a Girl"	Eli, Harris	2:58
9.	"Sunny"	Eli	1:17
10.	"Beyond the Bend"	Eli	2:22
11.	"Like a Girl"	Eli, Wise, Aver Ray	4:21
12.	"Feel Your Rain"		3:38
13.	"All at Once"		2:57
14.	"iTouch (Da Da)"	Eli, Jasper Harris, Megan Bülow	2:59
15.	"Somebody I'm Not"		3:29
16.	"Glitter"		3:12
17.	"Love U Thru the DJ" (featuring Ayleen Valentine)	Eli, Ayleen Valentine	3:30
18.	"Just for Show" (Stage Girl Final Performance; Live from the Bedroom)	Eli, Harris	2:42
Total length:			54:59

Notes

- The Vertigo Vinyl exclusive vinyl pressing of the album includes "Fortunately 4 U", "God Bless the BFA", and "Glitter" as bonus tracks, the former 2 songs appearing as tracks on the digital single of "Girl of Your Dreams".
