= Cadillac Chronicles =

American music and interview series created by Brian Freeman

Cadillac Chronicles TV is an American music and interview series created by Brian Freeman in 2024. The show features musicians, singers, music producers, and DJs performing songs and discussing their careers while moving in a Cadillac Eldorado through Atlanta, Georgia. The show is featured on Tubi TV and Apple TV.

== History ==
Freeman initially created the series to promote his own music, later inviting friends and DJs to perform in his 1974 Cadillac Eldorado. It was inspired by Mos Def's performance in Dave Chapelle's TV show. It started as a social media music series featuring R&B and hip hop artists. The videos eventually started attracting attention on social media and the interest from established musicians. And in 2024, the series expanded to feature well-known musicians and gained a television season on Tubi.

== Guests ==
The series features artists including 2 Chainz, CeeLo Green, the Isley Brothers, Chingey, Nivea, Yung Joc, Kem, Shanice, and Columbus Short. Episodes available on Tubi include appearances by T.I. and Young Dro, Talib Kweli, Blaque, Mr. Collipark, Iniko, Ready for the World, Cupid, Sweet Tee and Leny Williams.
