= Whatever It Takes (High Valley song) =

2021 single by Canadian country music group High Valley

Single by High Valley

from the album Way Back
- Released: November 12, 2021
- Genre: Country
- Length: 2:49
- Label: Cage Free; Sony Canada
- Songwriter(s): Brad Rempel; Ben Stennis; Jon Nite
- Producer(s): Seth Mosley; Mike "X" O'Connor

High Valley singles chronology
"River's Still Running" (2020)	"Whatever It Takes" (2021)	"Country Music, Girls and Trucks" (2022)

Lyric Video
- "Whatever It Takes" on YouTube

"Whatever It Takes" is a song recorded by Canadian country group High Valley. The group's frontman Brad Rempel co-wrote the song with Ben Stennis and Jon Nite. It is the lead single off their 2022 studio album Way Back, and the first single release after former member Curtis Rempel left the group.

== Background ==
"Whatever It Takes" was released simultaneously with the promotional single "Never Not". Brad Rempel stated he felt the song "captured that signature High Valley magic". He wrote the track on a night during a songwriting session with Ben Stennis and Jon Nite at Nite's beach house in Florida. The writers were ready to pack up that night when Rempel was strumming his guitar, and they decided to write and record the song. The line "swing a hammer, climb a ladder" refers to house flipping projects Rempel and his wife have been working on. Rempel wanted to write a "very old school bluegrassy melody" while his co-writers wanted to write a "European soccer stadium anthem" so they elected to "meet somewhere in the middle".

== Critical reception ==
"Whatever It Takes" was released to widespread positive reception. Markos Papadatos of Digital Journal described the song as "brimming with the group’s signature sound of positive-minded, bluegrass-tinted country". Anna D'Amico of American Songwriter noted "upbeat guitar and painting lyrics" in the track. Front Porch Music stated that the song "emphasizes a long-lasting love," and that it is more "upbeat" than "a typical slow ballad". Grace Lenehan Vaughn of Sounds Like Nashville said the song "features sing-along-worthy lyrics that paint a picture of an enduring love". Molly Millman of The Nash News stated that "Whatever It Takes" is "optimistic and hopeful by all means". Billy Dukes of Taste of Country called the track "classic High Valley," saying it "blends country and bluegrass with EDM".

== Commercial performance ==
"Whatever It Takes" reached a peak of number two on the Billboard Canada Country chart for during the week of April 16, 2022, spending 27 weeks on the chart in total. It marked the group’s fifteenth top ten hit. It also peaked at number 65 on the Canadian Hot 100 for the same week, and charted for 12 weeks overall on the all-genre chart. The song has been certified Gold by Music Canada.

== Charts ==
Chart performance for "Whatever It Takes"
Chart (2022)	Peak position
Canada (Canadian Hot 100)	65
Canada Country (Billboard)	2
US Country Indicator (Billboard)	43

== Certifications ==
Region	Certification	Certified units/sales
Canada (Music Canada)	Gold	40,000^{‡}
^{‡} Sales+streaming figures based on certification alone.
