= You're in It =

Single by Granger Smith

from the album When the Good Guys Win
- Released: May 7, 2018
- Genre: Country
- Length: 3:16
- Label: Wheelhouse
- Songwriter(s): Mark Nesler; Frank Rogers; Justin Adams
- Producer(s): Granger Smith; Derek Wells; Frank Rogers

Granger Smith singles chronology
"Happens Like That" (2017)	"You're in It" (2018)	"That's Why I Love Dirt Roads" (2019)

"You're in It" is a song written by Justin Adams, Frank Rogers and Mark Nesler, and recorded by American country music singer Granger Smith. It was released in May 2018 as the second single from his ninth studio album When the Good Guys Win. It peaked at No. 36 on the US Country Airplay chart.

== Content ==
In the song, the narrator looks back on good times and realizes that his lady love is always a part of his best moments.

== Music video ==
The music video is directed by Mason Dixon. The music video currently has over 2 million views on YouTube. Co-starring with Smith are fellow country singers Parker McCollum and Koe Wetzel and his wife Amber Smith.

== Chart performance ==
Chart (2018)	Peak position
US Hot Country Songs (Billboard)	41
US Country Airplay (Billboard)	36
