= 4×4 (Granger Smith EP) =

4x4

EP by Granger Smith
- Released: May 4, 2015
- Genre: Country
- Length: 17:59
- Label: Wheelhouse
- Producers: Frank Rogers (all tracks except 4); Granger Smith (all tracks)

Granger Smith chronology
| Dirt Road Driveway (2013) | 4x4 (2015) | Remington (2016) |

4x4 is the second extended play by American country music artist Granger Smith. It serves as his official debut EP on mainstream radio. The album's first single, "Backroad Song", was released to digital retailers and radio on March 24, 2015. Also included on the album is a song from his comedic alter-ego "Earl Dibbles Jr.". This extended play is also a preview of Smith's debut major label album, "Remington", which was released on March 4, 2016.

== Critical reception ==
The website "For the Country Record" gave the EP a positive review, stating that the EP is "definitely easy on the ears", and "the lead single is the perfect summer song to jam out to while cruising down your own back roads".

== Track listing ==
| No. | Title | Writer(s) | Length |
|---|---|---|---|
| 1. | "Backroad Song" | Frank Rogers, Granger Smith | 3:57 |
| 2. | "Tonight" | Rogers, Smith | 3:50 |
| 3. | "Tailgate Town" | Rogers, Smith | 5:47 |
| 4. | "City Boy Stuck" (featuring Earl Dibbles Jr.) | Earl Dibbles Jr., Austin Outlaw, Tyler Smith, Chris Lee | 4:25 |
| Total length: | | | 17:59 |

== Chart performance ==
The album debuted on the Top Country Albums chart at No. 6, and Billboard 200 at No. 51, selling 8,700 copies for the week.

| Chart (2015) | Peak position |
|---|---|
| US Billboard 200 | 51 |
| US Top Country Albums (Billboard) | 6 |
| US Independent Albums (Billboard) | 4 |
