= Four by four (disambiguation) =

Four-by-four or 4x4 refers primarily to a four-wheel drive, a vehicle with a drivetrain that allows all four wheels to receive torque simultaneously from an engine.

It may also refer to:

== Film, TV and games ==
- 4x4 (1965 film), a 1965 Nordic film
- 4x4 (2019 film), a 2019 Argentine film
- "4 x 4" (CSI), a 2005 episode of CSI: Crime Scene Investigation
- 4x4 (telenovela), a 2008 Argentine telenovela
- Rubik's Revenge, the 4x4x4 version of the Rubik's Cube

== Music ==
- 4x4 (band), a Ghanaian band
- 4x4 garage, an electronic dance music genre
- 4x4 (Carla Bley album), 2000
- 4x4, by Gemelli Diversi, 2000
- 4x4 (Casiopea album), 1982
- 4×4 (Granger Smith EP), 2015
- "4x4" (song), by Travis Scott
- "4x4", a 2001 song by Boiler Room
- "4x4", a 2013 song by Miley Cyrus from the album Bangerz
- "4x4", a 2023 song by Don Toliver from the album Hardstone Psycho
- "4x4", a 2026 song by Wage War from the EP It Calls Me by Name
- Four by Four, an album by Backyard Babies
- 4x4=12, an album by Deadmau5

== Other uses ==
- 4x4, the codename for the AMD Quad FX platform
- Four-by-four or 4x4, a size of lumber
- Name for the 4 × 400 metres relay track and field event
- FAA location identifier for Wessington Springs Airport, Wessington Springs, South Dakota US
