= Eli (musician) =

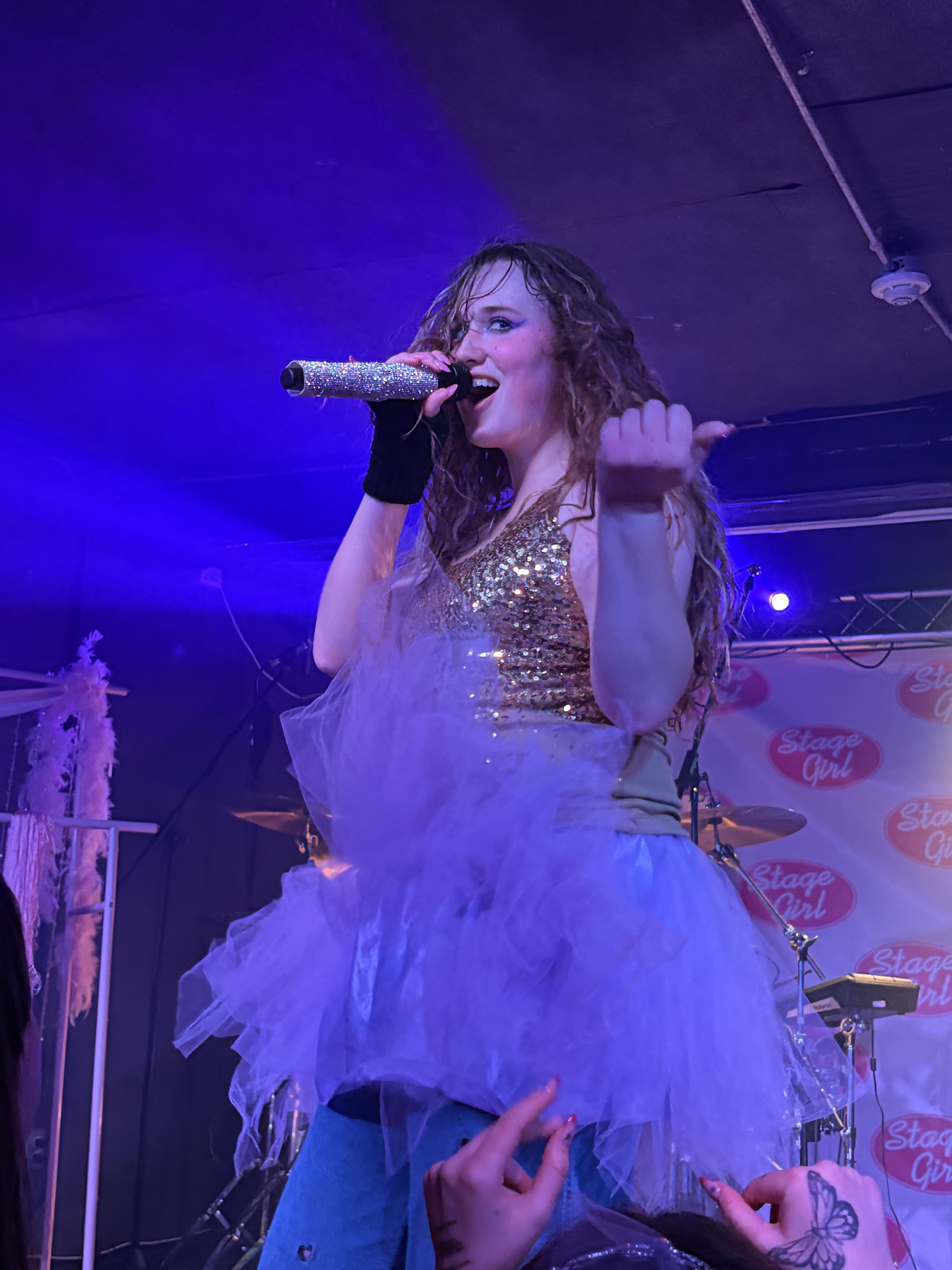
- Eli performing in 2026

Background information
- Born: October 12, 2000 (age 26)
- Origin: Norfolk, Massachusetts, U.S.
- Genres: Pop; R&B
- Occupation: Singer-songwriter
- Years active: 2023–present
- Labels: Zelig Music; RCA Records
- Website: www.journalofadoll.net

Eli Miller (born October 12, 2000), known mononymously as Eli, is an American singer-songwriter. Formerly known as Jeffrey Eli, she was born in New Jersey and raised in Norfolk, Massachusetts. She first gained notoriety by posting short-form content on the video platform Vine. She released her first EP, Seconds, at age 13 and her second, Rise, at age 16.

Eli signed with Zelig Music in partnership with RCA Records in 2023. She released her debut album, Stage Girl, in 2025, and embarked on her first tour the following year. Prior to the release of Stage Girl, she created and performed a one-woman musical in LA and NYC.

Some of Eli's main influences include various 2000s zeitgeists such as Miley Cyrus, Taylor Swift, Mariah Carey, and Britney Spears. Her music is a reflection of her youth, mostly discussing her experiences being a closeted transgender woman. Her style encompasses genres such as pop and R&B.

== Early life ==
Eli was born in New Jersey to parents Cindy and Jeff Miller. She was the middle child, between her older brother DePaul and younger brother Ronan. The family later moved to Norfolk, Massachusetts.

She attended public school, stating she did not make many friends and created music as an escape. She was raised Catholic by her family before coming out as transgender.

Growing up, Eli listened to artists such as Mariah Carey, Ariana Grande, and Katy Perry. The first album that she bought for herself was One of the Boys by Perry. She states in an interview for Huffington Post, "My parents would play that album (Merry Christmas) during the holiday season, and it was one of the first times that, in an insanely impactful way, I was hearing something and I was like, 'What the fuck is entering my ears right now?'"

Eli briefly studied recorded music at New York University but dropped out in 2023.

In 2025, after signing with new management, Eli came out as transgender. In an interview she commented, "I was finally feeling like I was in my body and allowing myself to show up truthfully and seek medical help. To go from being suicidal to then being like, 'Oh my god, I’m myself.' For the first time ever I know what it’s like to have a gut feeling, I know what it’s like to trust a voice in my head, to feel present because I’m not dysphoric."

== Career ==
=== 2013–2023: Career beginnings ===
After attracting initial attention on Youtube, Eli began posting covers of songs on the social media platform Vine in November 2013. By August 2014, she had attracted 1.2 million followers and appeared on Good Morning America.

Eli released her first single, "Double Tap," through iTunes in June 2014 at age 13. The following month, she performed at the San Diego social-music festival Brave Fest. She released her debut EP, Seconds, on September 9, 2014.

Her next EP, Rise, was released in October 2017. Rise contained six songs, five of which she co-wrote. The video for "Whatever It Takes" premiered on Billboard.com. That year, Eli was one of 12 artists featured in iHeartRadio and AT&T’s "About To Break" campaign.

After living in New York City for school, in 2023 Eli moved to Los Angeles to pursue a music career. She signed with RCA Records in partnership with Zelig Music. She would later move back to New York City for a relationship, which would later inspire her single, "Marianne".

=== 2024–present: Stage Girl, Glitter, and touring ===
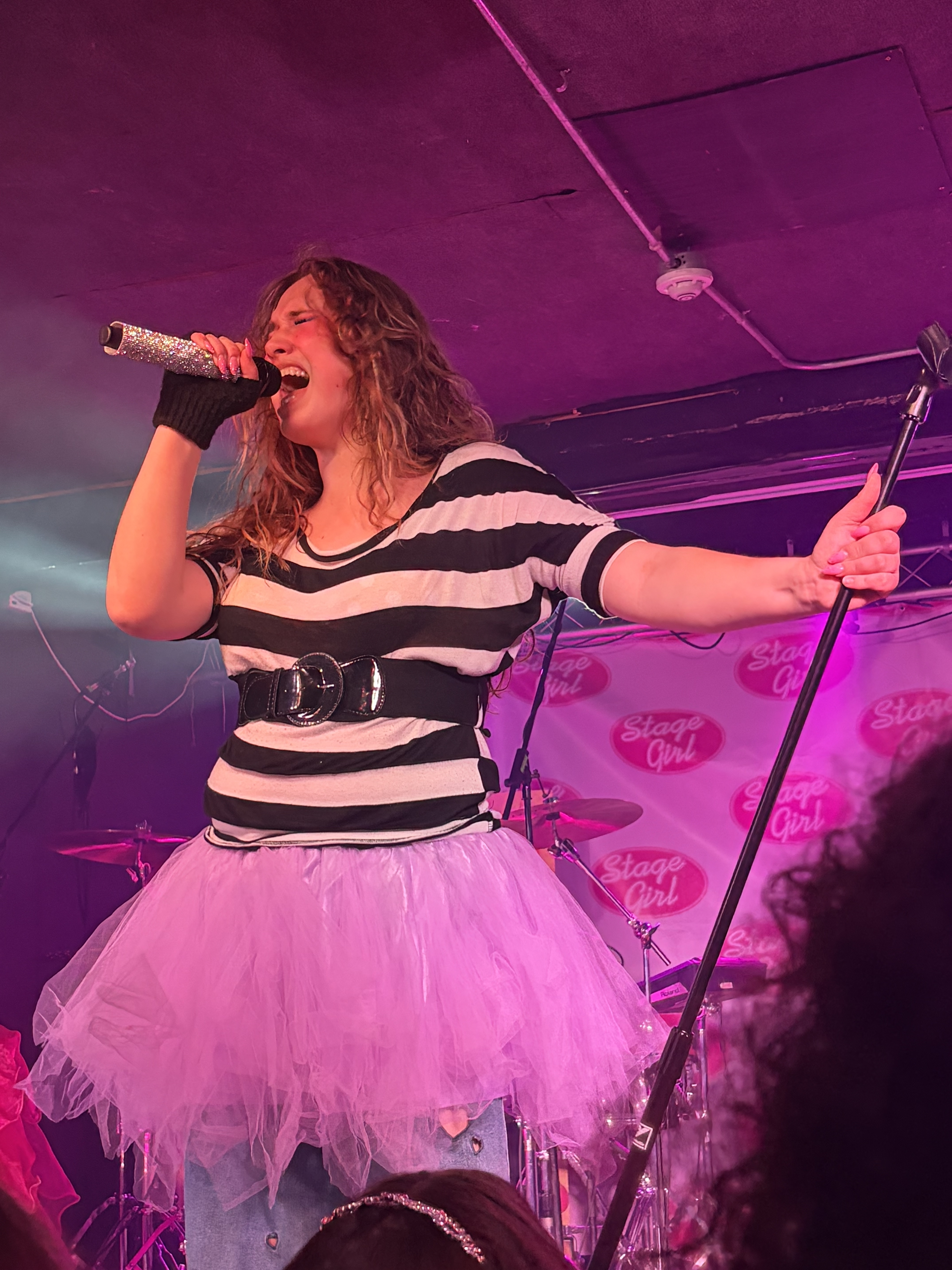
Eli Performing "Somebody I'm Not" in Toronto on her Stage Girl Tour on March 17, 2026

In 2024, Eli made a post on Instagram of the Stage Girl logo, which was made for both the album and the fictional American Idol-inspired reality TV show paired with it. She would later release singles "Marianne", "Girl of Your Dreams", "Like a Girl", and "All at Once", before releasing her debut album, Stage Girl on October 31, 2025. The album was met to positive reviews amongst consumers, with Vogue magazine listing it as one the best albums of 2025. Pollstar described it as "evidence of the power of pop music, positivity, and accepting yourself while throwing on some sparkles and a signature fedora."

In 2025, Eli signed with John Geraghty for management and Jenna Adler of CAA for representation. Adler said she first saw Eli performing under the name Jeffrey Eli at a pride show in Downtown LA. Later, Adler's son, whose friends were roommates with Eli, reconnected them.

Prior the release of Stage Girl, Eli put on a musical titled "Stage Girl: A One Woman Show" at Bob Baker Marionette Theater in LA and The Slipper Room in NYC in September 2025. The show was written, directed, and produced by Eli. The show later returned to the LA theater for a string of performances in February 2026.

In December 2025, Eli released the song "Glitter", which she would later perform at The GLAAD Media Awards. She then announced her first tour, titled "Eli is the Next Stage Girl". The tour commenced on March 8, 2026 and concluded on March 28, 2026. She performed across the United States and Canada.

On March 27, 2026, Eli released the song "Feel Your Rain".

On April 10, 2026, in an interview with Vogue, Eli confirmed a deluxe album for Stage Girl, coming May 22 of the same year. The album would later be officially announced on May 13th of the same year under the title Stage Girl (Not a Dream Anymore). She is billed to promote the deluxe album with two tours, a North American tour titled "Strange Girl: Live on Stage", and a European tour titled "Stage Girl: Starring Eli".

== Discography ==
=== Studio albums ===
List of studio albums, with selected details
Title	Details
Stage Girl	Released: October 31, 2025; Label: Zelig Music, RCA; Format: streaming, digital download, CD, LP

=== Singles ===
Title	Year	Album
"Double Tap"	2014	Seconds
"Whatever It Takes"	2017	Rise
"Zoom" (with Juliet Ivy)	2021	Non-album singles
"Casper"	2022	Non-album singles
"Ladybug"	2022	Non-album singles
"Sleeping Beauty"	2023	Non-album singles
"Gay Man"	2023	Non-album singles
"Wife Pleaser"	2024	Non-album singles
"Marianne"	2025	Stage Girl
"Girl of Your Dreams"	2025	Stage Girl
"Like a Girl"	2025	Stage Girl
"All at Once"	2025	Stage Girl
"Season of Freaks"	2025	Non-album single
"Glitter"	2025	Stage Girl (Not a Dream Anymore)
"Feel Your Rain"	2026	Stage Girl (Not a Dream Anymore)
"F**k the DJ"	2026	Stage Girl (Not a Dream Anymore)
"The Comeback"	2026	TBA

== Guest appearances ==
Title	Year	Other artist(s)	Album
"Crush (Girls Trip)"	2026	Zara Larsson	Midnight Sun: Girls Trip

== Awards and nominations ==
GLAAD Media Awards
Year	Award	Result
2026	Outstanding Breakthrough Media Artist	Nominated

== Tours ==
- Eli is the Next Stage Girl Tour (2026)
- Strange Girl: Live on Stage (2026)
- Stage Girl: Starring Eli (2026)
