= Act Like You Don't =

Single by Brooke Eden

from the album Welcome to the Weekend
- Released: February 13, 2017
- Genre: Country pop
- Length: 3:53
- Label: Red Bow
- Songwriters: Brooke Eden; Cary Barlowe; Jesse Frasure
- Producers: Jacob Durrett; Nick Brophy

Brooke Eden singles chronology
| "Diamonds" (2016) | "Act Like You Don't" (2017) |

"Act Like You Don't" is a song written and recorded by American country music singer Brooke Eden for her second extended play, Welcome to the Weekend (2016). Inspired by a real-life breakup, Eden co-wrote the country pop ballad with Cary Barlowe and Jesse Frasure. It was released to American country radio via Red Bow Records on February 13, 2017, as the EP's second single.

== Composition ==
"Act Like You Don't" is a country pop ballad about the struggle of moving on from a relationship that ended amicably. The song's lyrics find Eden "pleading for space" from an ex-girlfriend in order to heal from her heartbreak. Critics have complimented the "authentic" songwriting and have compared the song's themes to "Keep It to Yourself" by Kacey Musgraves.

== Critical reception ==
Lisa Konicki of Nash Country Weekly wrote that the song is "powerful" and has "got the makings of a hit." Billy Dukes of Taste of Country wrote that "every element of the song fits the mood," and called it "a true showcase of [Eden's] impressive range and emotion."

== Commercial performance ==
"Act Like You Don't" debuted at number 59 on the Country Airplay chart dated May 6, 2017, becoming Eden's second charting single.

== Charts ==
| Chart (2017) | Peak position |
|---|---|
| US Country Airplay (Billboard) | 49 |
