= Happens Like That =

Single by Granger Smith

from the album When the Good Guys Win
- Released: May 19, 2017
- Genre: Country
- Length: 2:51
- Label: Wheelhouse
- Songwriter(s): Granger Smith; Justin Wilson; Andy Albert; Tyler Hubbard
- Producer(s): Granger Smith; Derek Wells; Frank Rogers

Granger Smith singles chronology
"If the Boot Fits" (2016)	"Happens Like That" (2017)	"You're in It" (2018)

"Happens Like That" is a song recorded by American country music singer Granger Smith. Released in May 2017 as the lead single to his second Wheelhouse Records album When the Good Guys Win, the song was co-written by Smith along with Justin Wilson, Andy Albert, and Florida Georgia Line's Tyler Hubbard. The song was inspired by Smith's wife, who also appears in the song's video, and its lyrics tell of the progression of a couple's relationship.

== Content ==
Smith wrote "Happens Like That" with Justin Wilson, Andy Albert, and Florida Georgia Line member Tyler Hubbard. In an article for The Boot, Smith that the song was written while Smith was on tour with Florida Georgia Line, and the four of them wrote it "in just a couple hours". Thematically, the song is about the quick passage of time in a relationship. According to Smith, the song was inspired by his first encounter with his wife, Amber Bartlett, whom he met after she auditioned for a previous music video of his.

== Critical reception ==
Billy Dukes of Taste of Country wrote that "Smith is a master at finding soft spots with easily accessible, precise lyrics" while praising the "down-the-middle arrangement".

== Music video ==
The song's music video, directed by TK McKamy, recalls a love story similar to the one portrayed in the song. In it, Smith is alone in a field when a woman (portrayed by Bartlett) joins him and proposes to him. Afterward, the two of them portray a growing relationship that culminates in the arrival of a child (portrayed by the Smiths' youngest son River).

== Chart performance ==
=== Weekly charts ===
Chart (2017–2018)	Peak position
US Bubbling Under Hot 100 (Billboard)	12
US Country Airplay (Billboard)	13
US Hot Country Songs (Billboard)	18

=== Year-end charts ===
Chart (2018)	Position
US Hot Country Songs (Billboard)	67

== Certifications ==
Region	Certification	Certified units/sales
United States (RIAA)	Gold	500,000^{‡}
^{‡} Sales+streaming figures based on certification alone.
