= Adam Mac =

American country singer

- Born: 1989 or 1990 (age 36–37)
- Origin: Russellville, Kentucky
- Genres: Country music; Disco
- Occupation: Singer

Adam Mac is an American country singer. A former Billboard Country Rookie of the Month, he is best known for his songs centering LGBTQ+ themes. He is also a member of the LGBTQ+ country supergroup The Cowgays, along with Brooke Eden and Chris Housman.

== Biography ==
Mac was raised in Russellville, Kentucky and grew up singing. According to him, his earliest memories are singing in church. He began to realize he was gay when he was around 6 or 7 years old. He has recounted how a week before graduation, his best friend died, which made him start songwriting.

Around 2012, he moved to Nashville, Tennessee to pursue music and soon came out as gay. He auditioned for American Idol, but subsequently was sent home in the first round of Hollywood Week. In 2019, he participated in American Idol once again, where he was selected by Katy Perry to join her team and called her "big gay rhinestone cowboy".

In 2020, during the COVID-19 pandemic, he discovered a love of disco and began adding that to his music. He also began adding pronouns to his songs, which he had previously avoided.

In 2022, he released a song, described as his "breakthrough" by Billboard, "Disco Cowboy". It held the number-one spot on the CMT Twelve-Pack Countdown for four weeks. He subsequently created an album by the same name.

Also in 2023, he was asked to perform at the Logan County, Kentucky Tobacco and Heritage Festival, which occurs in his hometown of Russellville. He had previously sung about the town in his song "That Ain't Country", proclaiming how they'd support him and have his back. However, he announced he would be stepping down from performing at this festival, allegedly due to board members not wanting him to be "promoting homosexuality" on stage and due to people stating that they would hold protests at the show. The county refused to comment. He received support from Ginger Minj, Kelsea Ballerini, Maren Morris, and Brandy Clark, and went on to open for Morris in Chicago.

His 2024 song "Dust Off Your Boots" was described as the "line dance of summer" by People.

In 2025, he was named Billboard's Country Rookie of the Month for November 2025.

In 2026, while continuing his solo career he joined supergroup The Cowgays, together with Chris Housman and Brooke Eden. They had their first live show in March 2026.

That same year, he added the Hank Williams Jr. song Dinosaur to his frequent performances, altering it to remove its homophobic lyrics.

== Personal life ==
Mac is married to real estate broker Lee Pfund, who he met in 2017. In 2024, they became engaged and subsequently married in July 2025. Mac's song "Last Rodeo" was, according to him, written as his "wedding vows". They have two French bulldogs, Priscilla and Pearl.

== Discography ==
=== Albums ===
- Southern Spectacle (2025)
- Disco Cowboy (2023)
- Horizon (2016)

=== EPs ===
- Adam Mac (2019)

=== Singles ===
- "Been Done Did That" (as part of The Cowgays) (2026)
- "New Religion" (2026)
- "Kids Like Us" (2026)
- "Hate To See Me Coming" (2026)
- "Good Hoedown" (as part of The Cowgays) (2026)
- "Wish I Wasn't Gay" (as part of The Cowgays) (2026)
- "Old Photograph" (2025)
- "All Dollars, No Sense" (2025)
- "Last Rodeo" (2025)
- "Southern Spectacle" (2025)
- "Dust Off Your Boots" (2024)
- "Chapel" (with Jenna DeVries) (2023)
- "Take Myself Home" (2023)
- "New Vibration" (2022)
- "Disco Cowboy" (2022)
- "Make You Mine" (2021)
- "The Fool" (2019)
- "Bad Decision" (2019)
- "Lead Me On" (2019)
- "Black and White" (2018)
