= Brooke Eden =

American singer (born 1988)

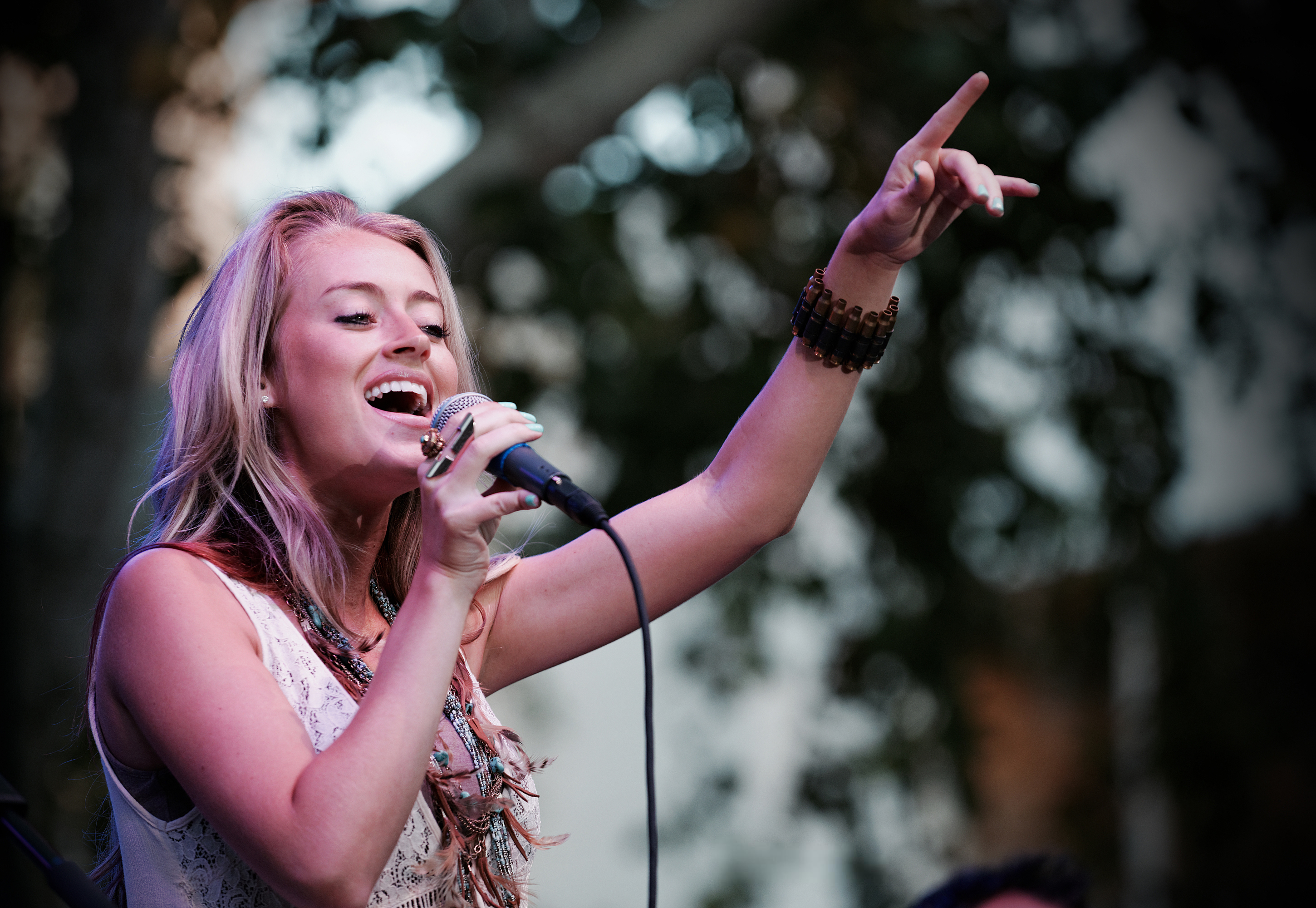
- Brooke Eden performing in Los Angeles in 2015

Background information
- Born: Brooke Eden Helvie; December 30, 1988 (age 37); West Palm Beach, Florida, U.S.
- Origin: Loxahatchee, Florida, U.S.
- Genre: Country
- Occupations: Singer; songwriter
- Years active: 2008–present
- Label: Red Bow
- Spouse: Hilary Hoover (m. 2022)
- Website: Official website

Brooke Eden Helvie (born December 30, 1988), known professionally as Brooke Eden, is an American country music singer and songwriter. Eden auditioned for both the seventh and tenth seasons of American Idol, making it to Hollywood week on the former. She signed with Red Bow Records in 2015 after generating interest for her self-released single "American Dreamin'". In 2026, she joined supergroup The Cowgays along with Adam Mac and Chris Housman.

== Early life and education ==
Eden developed an interest in music at a young age through accompanying her father to performances of his as a drummer in a local country group. In her teens, she played local music festivals and opened for such acts as Alan Jackson and Brooks & Dunn. Eden graduated from Wellington High School in 2007. She attended high school with and befriended fellow musician Cassadee Pope. In 2008, Eden won the title of "Miss South Florida" at a regional beauty pageant and auditioned for season seven of the singing competition television show, American Idol. She made it through to the Hollywood week, but was eliminated from the competition before the live rounds. Eden auditioned again for the show's tenth season but failed to advance. After graduating from the University of Florida with a degree in marketing, Eden moved to Nashville, Tennessee and in 2013, she signed a publishing deal with BMI.

== Career ==
=== 2014–present: Brooke Eden and Welcome to the Weekend ===
In March 2014, Eden independently released a five-song self-titled extended play. A single, titled "American Dreamin'", followed that July, which generated interest at satellite radio but failed to impact the charts. Eden signed to independent record label Red Bow Records (a sister label of Broken Bow Records) in 2015. Her single "Daddy's Money" was released in December 2015 and reached number 50 on the Billboard Country Airplay chart. She released her second EP, Welcome to the Weekend, and its lead single, "Diamonds", in September 2016. "Act Like You Don't" was released to American country radio on February 13, 2017 as the record's second single.

On June 29, 2019 she opened for Garth Brooks' "stadium tour" in front of 60,000 fans at Autzen stadium in Eugene Oregon.

In 2021, she released new songs "No Shade" and "Sunroof".

In 2026, she became a part of supergroup The Cowgays along with Adam Mac and Chris Housman.

== Personal life ==
In December 2015, Eden began dating Hilary Hoover, a radio promoter, but stayed closeted until January 2021 when she publicly came out. The couple married on August 27, 2022, in Nashville, Tennessee, officiated by Trisha Yearwood. On November 2, 2024, Hoover gave birth to their first child.

== Discography ==
=== Extended plays ===
| Title | Details |
|---|---|
| Brooke Eden | Release date: March 23, 2014; Label: Self-released |
| Welcome to the Weekend | Release date: September 23, 2016; Label: Red Bow Records |
| Choosing You | Release date: July 29, 2022; Label: Broken Bow Records |
| Outlaw Love | Release date: June 9, 2023; Label: Broken Bow Records |

=== Singles ===
| Year | Single | Peak chart positions | Album |
| Year | Single | US Country Airplay | Album |
|---|---|---|---|
| 2014 | "American Dreamin'" | — | Non-album singles |
| 2015 | "Daddy's Money" | 50 | Non-album singles |
| 2016 | "Diamonds" | — | Welcome to the Weekend |
| 2017 | "Act Like You Don't" | 49 | Welcome to the Weekend |

=== Other appearances ===
| Year | Title | Artist | Album |
|---|---|---|---|
| 2016 | "Crazy as Me" | Granger Smith | Remington |
| 2023 | "Delta Dawn" | Home Free | |
