= If the Boot Fits =

Single by Granger Smith

from the album Remington
- Released: March 14, 2016
- Genre: Country
- Length: 2:50
- Label: Wheelhouse
- Songwriters: Jordan Schmidt; Andy Albert; Mitchell Tenpenny
- Producers: Frank Rogers; Granger Smith

Granger Smith singles chronology
"Backroad Song" (2015)	"If the Boot Fits" (2016)	"Happens Like That" (2017)

"If the Boot Fits" is a song recorded by American country music artist Granger Smith. It was released to radio on March 14, 2016, as the second and final single from his major label debut album, Remington. The song was written by Jordan Schmidt, Andy Albert and Mitchell Tenpenny.

== Critical reception ==
Website Taste of Country gave the song a favorable review, praising the lyrics and writing that "“If the Boot Fits” is a familiar country love story that borrows from a fairytale."

== Music video ==
The music video was directed by Paul De La Cerda and premiered in August 2016.

== Chart performance ==
=== Weekly charts ===
Chart (2016–2017)	Peak position
Canada Country (Billboard)	9
US Billboard Hot 100	80
US Country Airplay (Billboard)	6
US Hot Country Songs (Billboard)	14

=== Year-end charts ===
Chart (2016)	Position
US Hot Country Songs (Billboard)	89

Chart (2017)	Position
US Country Airplay (Billboard)	55
US Hot Country Songs (Billboard)	78
