= Iniko =

American R&B singer

- Born: Iniko Ijhara Dixon; October 26, 1996 (age 29); Brooklyn, New York, U.S.
- Occupations: Singer; songwriter; record producer
- Years active: 2017–present
- Father: Max Dixon
- Musical career
- Origin: Brooklyn, New York
- Genres: R&B; pop; soul; alternative pop; hip-hop
- Instruments: Vocal; piano
- Labels: Audio Angel; Colombia; Sony Music
- Website: inikoworld.com

Iniko Ijhara Dixon, known mononymously as Iniko, is an American singer-songwriter. They are known for their viral singles "The King's Affirmation" and "Jericho."

== Early life ==
Iniko Ijhara Dixon was born in Brooklyn, New York in 1996. They are of Afro-Jamaican descent. Their mother is of mixed heritage and their father Max Dixon is Jamaican, a singer in the American reggae band Souljahs. (Note: Sometimes spelled "Soldiers") Raised in the Independent Fundamental Baptist tradition, Iniko received classical choral training in church youth programs in Brooklyn. They have publicly disclosed having experienced religious trauma, attributing much of their emotional and creative resilience to working through that past.

Iniko describes themself as "genderless".

== Career ==
In mid-2017, Iniko started a career as a featured singer in the reggae band Souljahs, led by their father Max Dixon.

In 2018, Iniko released their single "Kingdom" on 12 October 2018.

In 2021, they were posting on social media songs they had written and produced themselves, as well as reimagined versions and covers of songs by other artists, including a reimagined version of Travis Scott’s Yosemite that was released on social media on March 4, 2023, and released as their single on May 13 of the same year, and is now on their album The Awakening.

Iniko's breakthrough came with the release of "The King’s Affirmation," released on 29 April 2021, which gained viral attention on TikTok. They arrived on Billboard’s charts, as their song "Jericho" debuted at No. 11 on R&B Digital Song Sales.

Their debut studio album, The Awakening, was released on 31 January 2025.

== Discography ==
=== Studio albums ===
- The Awakening (2025)

=== Extended plays ===
- Both of Them (2020)

=== As lead artist ===
List of singles, with selected chart positions and certifications, showing year released, certifications and album name.
Title	Year	Peak chart positions		Certifications	Album
Title	Year	NZ	UK	Certifications	Album
"Along Came Love" (featuring Ab$o The Great)	2017	—	—		Non-album singles
"Evol" (featuring Backstrom)	2017	—	—		Non-album singles
"Fairytale"	2017	—	—		Non-album singles
"Sakura"	2017	—	—		Non-album singles
"Kingdom"	2018	—	—		Non-album singles
"Pinocchio"	2019	—	—		Non-album singles
"Caught a Body"	2020	—	—		Both of Them
"Luna"	2021	—	—		Non-album singles
"Hourglass"	2022	—	—		Non-album singles
"The King's Affirmation"	2022	—	—		The Awakening
"Jericho"	2023	18	45	RIAA: Gold; BPI: Silver	The Awakening
"Yosemite (Song For The Ahwahnechee)"	2023	—	—		The Awakening
"Armor"	2024	—	—		The Awakening
"Invasion"	2024	—	—		The Awakening
"Satellite"	2024	—	—		Non-album single
"333"	2024	—	—		The Awakening
"God Body"	2025	—	—		The Awakening
"Man In Black"	2026	—	—		Non-album single
"—" denotes a recording that did not chart or was not released in that territory.

=== As featured artist ===
List of singles, showing year released and album name.
Title	Year	Album
"Cream Rises (To the Top)" (SoulJAHS featuring Iniko)	2017	SoulJAHS, Re Creation

== Filmography ==
Iniko performed songs on the following film or series soundtracks:

- Naps (2018)

=== Web series ===
Year	Title	Role	Notes
2018	Naps	Girl 1	Cameo (Episode 3)
2019	Middle of Somewhere	Nick Morello	Main cast

== Awards and nominations ==
Year	Presenter	Award	Result	Ref.
2024	GLAAD Media Awards	Outstanding Breakthrough Music Artist	Nominated	

== Tours ==
- The Awakening Tour (2024–2025)
  - Awakening The Empire (North America) (2025)
