= Chris Housman =

American country singer-songwriter

- Born: 1990 (age 35–36); US
- Occupation: Singer-songwriter
- Instruments: Vocals, guitar
- Member of: The Cowgays
- Website: chrishousman.com

Chris Housman (born c. 1990) is an American country singer-songwriter. He is a member of the supergroup The Cowgays with Adam Mac and Brooke Eden.

== Life ==
Housman was born c. 1990 in western Kansas and raised on a farm outside of Hanston, Kansas. He came out at the age of 18. He attended Belmont University.

Housman is known for his songs that feature gay themes. In 2020, he released the single "Nobody" about his experience going through a breakup. It was co-written with his friends Emily Kroll and Christian Wood. He purposely did not use any male or female pronouns in the lyrics. In 2021, he released "Blueneck" cowritten with Nell Maynard. It charted number one on the iTunes country chart and sixteen on the Billboard Digital Country Sales chart and went viral on TikTok. On April 14, 2023, following the passage of the Tennessee Adult Entertainment Act, Housman released "Drag Queen" in support of the LGBTQ community. The song was cowritten by Housman, Chris Sligh, and Mary Kutter. The music video was filmed in the Nashville gay bar, Play where Housman saw his first drag show in 2008. Directed by Ford Fairchild, it included local drag queens Arsyn, Perplexity, Sasha Dereon, Ivy St. James, Vanity, Deception, and Obsinity. All royalties from the song are donated to a Nashville-based LGBT youth nonprofit, Just Us at Oasis Center.

In April 2024, Housman released the single "Guilty As Sin" about a gay romance in a country setting. The music video was directed by Fairchild and features Housman and Gabe LaDuke.

He is a member of the supergroup The Cowgays with Adam Mac and Brooke Eden.

== Discography ==
- Blueneck (2024)
- Dodge City (2026)
