= Dirt Road Driveway =

Studio album by Granger Smith
- Released: April 16, 2013
- Genre: Country
- Label: Pioneer Music/Thirty Tigers
- Producer: Granger Smith

Granger Smith chronology
Poets & Prisoners (2011)	Dirt Road Driveway (2013)	Remington (2016)

Dirt Road Driveway is the seventh studio album from American country music artist Granger Smith. Released on 16 April 2013, the work was published via Pioneer Music, with distribution from Thirty Tigers.

== Content ==
Five singles were released from the album: "We Do It in a Field", "Silverado Bench Seat", "Miles and Mud Tires", "If Money Didn't Matter", and "Bury Me in Blue Jeans".

== Critical reception ==
Stephen Thomas Erlewine of AllMusic says that "Smith's appeal is how he seems like the guy next door but it's also his Achilles heel — he seems like any old good old boy who might cross your way, which is reason enough to like him, but there's no hook to make you remember him."

== Track listing ==
All tracks written by Granger Smith, except where noted.

1. "We Do It in a Field" - 3:30
2. "If Money Didn't Matter" - 3:50
3. "Stick Around" (David Ramirez) - 3:06
4. "19 Forever" - 3:23
5. "I Am the Midnight" - 3:57
6. "Miles and Mud Tires" - 2:48
7. "Come" - 3:22
8. "Silverado Bench Seat" - 2:55
9. "Easy" - 3:36
10. "Bury Me in Blue Jeans" (Granger Smith, Kevin Graham) - 3:41
11. "Country Boy Love" - 3:32
  - featuring Earl Dibbles Jr.
12. "The Country Boy Song" (Granger Smith, Tylerr Smith, Matt Caldwell, Chris Lee) - 3:26
  - featuring Earl Dibbles Jr.

== Personnel ==
Adapted from liner notes.

Musicians

- Geoff Ashcraft - electric guitar, piano, mandolin
- Mitch Connell - piano, organ
- Austin Davis - banjo
- Milo Deering - pedal steel guitar, fiddle, mandolin, Dobro
- Kris Farrow - electric guitar
- Wes Hightower - background vocals
- Todd Howard - electric guitar, classical guitar
- Chad Jeffers - Dobro
- Caleb Kelly - drums
- Tim Lauer - keyboards, accordion
- Dusty Saxton - drums
- Amber Smith - background vocals
- Granger Smith - vocals, acoustic guitar, electric guitar, keyboards, percussion, shotgun
- Jonathan Wisinski - bass guitar

Technical

- Billy Decker - mixing
- Chris Latham - mastering
- Granger Smith - producer

== Chart history ==
Chart (2013)	Peak position
US Billboard 200	48
US Top Country Albums (Billboard)	15
US Independent Albums (Billboard)	11
