= Country Music, Girls and Trucks =

2022 single by High Valley and Granger Smith

Single by High Valley with Granger Smith
- Released: April 22, 2022
- Genre: Country
- Length: 2:49
- Label: Cage Free
- Songwriters: Brad Rempel; Jaron Boyer; Micah Wilshire
- Producer: Micah Wilshire

High Valley singles chronology
"Whatever It Takes" (2021)	"Country Music, Girls and Trucks" (2022)	"Do This Life" (2023)

Granger Smith singles chronology
"Hate You Like I Love You" (2021)	"Country Music, Girls and Trucks" (2022)

Music video
- "Country Music, Girls and Trucks" on YouTube

"Country Music, Girls and Trucks" is a song by Canadian country group High Valley and American country singer Granger Smith. The song was written by the group's frontman Brad Rempel along with Jaron Boyer and Micah Wilshire, while Wilshire produced the track. It was the second single off High Valley's sixth studio album Way Back, and Smith's last single before retiring from country music.

== Background ==
Brad Rempel of High Valley and Granger Smith had become friends as fellow songwriters, with Smith previously recording two songs that Rempel had written: "That's Why I Love Dirt Roads" and "Buy a Boy a Baseball". Smith remarked that he trusts the songs Rempel sends to him. Rempel wanted to record "Country Music, Girls and Trucks" with Smith, so they agreed to a trade-off: Smith would join High Valley on the song so long as Rempel joined Smith on his farm in Texas to film the music video. Rempel added that "as tongue in cheek and as ridiculously on the nose as the title is, if you actually listen to the lyrics, in my opinion, it's telling an actual story that’s true". He and Smith posted childhood photos on several social media platforms to promote the release of the song.

== Music video ==
The official music video for "Country Music, Girls and Trucks" premiered on After MidNite on May 20, 2022. The video was directed by Josh Gicker, and shot on Granger Smith's farm in Texas during his second annual "YeeYee Day". It features Rempel and Smith driving a truck, and many others enjoying "YeeYee Day" in trucks, ATVs, and jumping into a lake.

== Charts ==
The song first entered the Canada Country airplay chart at number 41 for the chart dated June 6, 2022. The song peaked at number 6 on its 21st week on the chart, while also debuting at number 87 on the Canada Hot 100 during the same week.

Chart performance for "Country Music, Girls and Trucks"
Chart (2022)	Peak position
Canada Hot 100 (Billboard)	87
Canada Country (Billboard)	6
