= When the Good Guys Win =

Studio album by Granger Smith
- Released: October 27, 2017
- Genre: Country
- Label: Wheelhouse
- Producer: Granger Smith; Derek Wells; Frank Rogers

Granger Smith chronology
Remington (2016)	When the Good Guys Win (2017)	Country Things (2020)

Singles from When the Good Guys Win
- 1. "Happens Like That" Released: June 12, 2017; 2. "You're in It" Released: May 7, 2018

When the Good Guys Win is the ninth studio album by American country music artist Granger Smith, released on October 27, 2017. The album includes the singles "Happens Like That" and "You're in It".

== Reception ==
When the Good Guys Win debuted at No. 2 on Billboard's Top Country Albums chart, with 15,000 copies sold (17,000 units including tracks sales and streams). It has sold 56,300 copies in the United States as of April 2019.

== Track listing ==
When the Good Guys Win
No.	Title	Writer(s)	Length
1.	"Gimme Something"	Jared Mullins, Jordan Schmidt, Justin Wilson	3:10
2.	"You're in It"	Frank Rogers, Justin Adams, Mark Nesler	3:16
3.	"Raise Up Your Glass"	Rogers, Matt Alderman, Ty Graham	3:48
4.	"Happens Like That"	Granger Smith, Justin Wilson, Andy Albert, Tyler Hubbard	2:51
5.	"Still Holds Up"	Smith, Wilson, Schmidt, Albert	2:58
6.	"When the Good Guys Win"	Deric Ruttan, Jonathan Singleton, Ben Hayslip	3:14
7.	"Everybody Lives"	Tommy Cecil, Seth Ennis, Jay Brunswick, Jaida Dreyer	4:01
8.	"Stutter"	Smith, Wilson, Schmidt, Albert	3:18
9.	"Never Too Old"	Smith, Wilson, Schmidt, Albert	3:30
10.	"Love Ain't Blind"	Smith, Wilson, Jamie Paulin	3:42
11.	"4 Wheel Drive"	Smith, Rogers, Mike Fiorentino	4:01
12.	"Reppin' My Roots"	Smith, Schmidt, Josh Mirenda, Jaron Boyer	2:50
13.	"Don't Tread on Me" (featuring Earl Dibbles Jr.)	Earl Dibbles, Jr., Austin Outlaw, Chris Gainz	3:34
14.	"Home Cooked Meal"	Smith, Rogers	4:30
Total length:			48:43

== Personnel ==
Adapted from liner notes.

- Dave Cohen - Hammond B-3 organ, piano, synthesizer
- Earl Dibbles Jr. - featured vocals on "Don't Tread On Me"
- Kris Donegan - acoustic guitar, electric guitar
- Mike Johnson - dobro
- Rachel Loy - bass guitar
- Carl Minor - banjo, acoustic guitar, mandolin
- Gordon Mote - piano
- Jerry Roe - drums
- Jason Kyle Saetveit - background vocals
- Jordan Schmidt - electric guitar
- Amber Smith - background vocals
- Lincoln Smith - additional vocals
- Granger Smith - lead vocals
- Bryan Sutton - banjo, acoustic guitar
- Derek Wells - bass guitar, dobro, electric guitar

== Charts ==
Chart (2017)	Peak position
US Billboard 200	29
US Independent Albums (Billboard)	4
US Top Country Albums (Billboard)	2
