= Country Things =

Studio album by Granger Smith
- Released: September 25, 2020
- Genre: Country
- Length: 26:00
- Label: Wheelhouse
- Producer: Granger Smith; Corey Crowder; John Marlin; Jordan Schmidt; Frank Rogers; Derek Wells; Trent Willmon

Granger Smith chronology
When the Good Guys Win (2017)	Country Things (2020)	Moonrise (2022)

Country Things is the tenth studio album by American country musician Granger Smith, released on September 25, 2020. Work on the album began in early 2019, but the death of Smith's 3-year-old son put the album on hold. When the COVID-19 pandemic hit, Smith was able to focus on writing songs again and completing the album. The first single from the album, "That's Why I Love Dirt Roads", was released in October 2019. The album was initially released as two individual discs, Country Things, Vol. 1 and Country Things, Vol. 2.

== Background ==
Granger Smith had begun writing songs for the album in the beginning of 2019. He was half-way done when tragedy struck. His 3-year-old son, River, died on June 6, 2019, after accidentally falling into the pool at their home, and everything was put on hold. It took nearly ten months before Smith started writing songs again, and when the COVID-19 pandemic further delayed the new album, he continued to write more songs. Instead of overloading the songs onto one album, the decision was made to split them up, eight songs on each album. Country Things Vol. 1 was released on September 25, 2020, with volume 2 released in November.

== Inspiration ==
Country Things Vol. 1 is a personal album for Smith, who after dealing with the tragedy of his son's death, said "it became about appreciating the gratefulness in the day without being overweighed by the worries of tomorrow." He wanted to focus on "the things you want to raise your kids with and find joy in. The country things." Songs on the album reflect not only his family values and deep introspection, but also Smith's penchant for fun. The track, "Country and Ya Know It", features an appearance by his alter ego, Earl Dibbles Jr.

== Singles ==
"That's Why I Love Dirt Roads" was released as a single on October 25, 2019, peaking at No. 50 on the Billboard Country Airplay chart in July 2020. The second single, "Hate You Like I Love You", was released February 8, 2021.

== Track listing ==
Volume 1

All tracks are written by Granger Smith.

No.	Title	Length
1.	"Country Things"	3:38
2.	"Hate You Like I Love You"	2:55
3.	"I Kill Spiders"	3:34
4.	"That's Why I Love Dirt Roads"	3:39
5.	"Mexico"	3:40
6.	"Chevys, Hemis, Yodas, and Fords"	3:09
7.	"Heroes"	3:36
8.	"Country and Ya Know It" (featuring Earl Dibbles Jr.)	2:45
Total length:		26:00

Volume 2

All tracks are written by Granger Smith.

No.	Title	Length
1.	"Man Made"	3:13
2.	"Buy a Boy a Baseball"	2:32
3.	"Anything Like Me"	2:50
4.	"That's What Love Looks Like"	3:25
5.	"Where I Get It From"	3:06
6.	"6 String Stories"	3:40
7.	"Workaholic"	3:12
8.	"Diesel"	3:02
Total length:		25:08

== Personnel ==
Adapted from AllMusic

- Geoff Ashcroft – electric guitar
- Eric Belz – keyboards, programming
- Tyler Chiarelli – electric guitar
- Dave Cohen – keyboards
- Corey Crowder – programming, background vocals
- Eric Darken – drums, percussion
- Earl Dibbles Jr. – featured vocals on "Country and Ya Know It"
- Kris Donegan – acoustic guitar
- Kyle Fishman – keyboards, programming
- Shannon Forrest – drums
- Wes Hightower – background vocals
- Mark Hill – bass guitar
- Chad Jeffers – banjo
- Mike Johnson – pedal steel guitar
- Todd Lombardo – banjo, acoustic guitar, mandolin
- Rachel Loy – bass guitar
- Devin Malone – acoustic guitar, electric guitar, mandolin
- John Marlin – acoustic guitar, electric guitar, mandolin, programming, synthesizer
- Miles McPherson – drums, percussion
- Katlin Owen – acoustic guitar, electric guitar
- Hunter Phelps – background vocals
- Jerry Roe – drums, percussion
- Jason Kyle Saetveit – background vocals
- Jordan Schmidt – percussion, background vocals
- Jimmie Lee Sloas – bass guitar
- Ernestine Smith – background vocals
- Granger Smith – lead vocals, background vocals
- London Smith – additional vocals
- Bryan Sutton – acoustic guitar, ukulele
- Lars Thorson – fiddle
- Derek Wells – banjo, acoustic guitar, bass guitar, electric guitar, Hammond B-3 organ, mandolin, programming, slide guitar
- Bryan David Willis – background vocals
- Trent Willmon – electric guitar
- Brad Winters – programming
- Alex Wright – Hammond B-3 organ, keyboards, piano, programming, synthesizer

== Charts ==
Chart performance for Country Things Vol. 1
Chart (2020)	Peak position
US Top Album Sales (Billboard)	35
US Top Country Albums (Billboard)	25
US Independent Albums (Billboard)	46
