= Backroad Song =

Single by Granger Smith

from the album Remington
- Released: October 5, 2015
- Recorded: 2015
- Genre: Country
- Length: 3:56
- Label: Wheelhouse
- Songwriters: Granger Smith; Frank Rogers
- Producers: Frank Rogers; Granger Smith

Granger Smith singles chronology
"Bury Me in Blue Jeans" (2014)	"Backroad Song" (2015)	"If the Boot Fits" (2016)

"Backroad Song" is the major-label debut single by American country music artist Granger Smith. It was initially released to radio independently on March 24, 2015, but was officially re-released to radio on October 5, 2015 via Wheelhouse Records. It is included on his major label debut album, Remington, released March 4, 2016. The song was written by Smith and Frank Rogers. It garnered positive reviews from music critics who praised Smith's vocal performance and his detail-oriented lyrics with Rogers.

"Backroad Song" peaked at number one on the Billboard Country Airplay chart, giving Smith his only number-one country hit. It also reached numbers 4 and 49 on both the Hot Country Songs and Hot 100 charts respectively. The song has sold 293,000 copies in the United States as of March 2016. It received similar chart success in Canada, peaking at number 2 on the Country chart and number 69 on the Canadian Hot 100.

The accompanying music video for the song was directed by Chris Hicky.

== Content ==
The song is a "descriptive picture of a country back road".

== Critical reception ==
Giving it a "B+", Bob Paxman of Nash Country Weekly praised Smith's "warm, rich voice" and the detail of the lyrics, also writing that "Thematically...'Backroad Song' isn't high on originality, but it bubbles over with the brightness of a summer day." An uncredited review from Taste of Country similarly praised the lyrics, saying that "'Backroad Song' is country music you can see and nearly smell. The addition of Rogers is meant to fine-tune Smith’s sound so he can reach a wider audience. He’s already got a nice head start over those looking for the same thing."

== Commercial performance ==
The song first entered the Hot Country Song chart at number 25 on chart dated April 11, 2015 on its initial release, selling 33,000 copies in its first week. It debuted at number 58 on the Country Airplay chart for the chart week of July 18, 2015. The song reached number 1 on its 32nd week on that chart in February 2016. It also peaked at number 4 on Hot Country Songs, and number 49 on the Hot 100 chart. The song has sold over 500,000 copies in the US as of February 2020.

== Music video ==
The music video was directed by Chris Hicky and premiered in January 2016.

== Chart performance ==
=== Weekly charts ===
Chart (2015–2016)	Peak position
Canada Hot 100 (Billboard)	69
Canada Country (Billboard)	2
US Billboard Hot 100	49
US Country Airplay (Billboard)	1
US Hot Country Songs (Billboard)	4

=== Year-end charts ===
Chart (2015)	Position
US Country Airplay (Billboard)	97
Chart (2016)	Position
US Country Airplay (Billboard)	36
US Hot Country Songs (Billboard)	38

== Certifications ==
Region	Certification	Certified units/sales
United States (RIAA)	Gold	500,000^{‡}
^{‡} Sales+streaming figures based on certification alone.
