= Remington (album) =

Studio album by Granger Smith
- Released: March 4, 2016
- Recorded: 2015–16
- Genre: Country
- Length: 58:00
- Label: Wheelhouse
- Producers: Frank Rogers; Granger Smith

Granger Smith chronology
Dirt Road Driveway (2013)	Remington (2016)	When the Good Guys Win (2017)

Singles from Remington
- 1. "Backroad Song" Released: October 5, 2015; 2. "If the Boot Fits" Released: March 14, 2016

Remington is the major-label debut album from American country music artist Granger Smith. It was released on March 4, 2016, via Wheelhouse Records. Its lead single, "Backroad Song", was released independently to radio on March 24, 2015. It was then re-released to radio on October 5, 2015, after Smith's signing with the label. The album's second single, "If the Boot Fits", was released to country radio on March 14, 2016.

== Commercial performance ==
The album debuted at No. 3 on the Top Country Albums chart, a career high for Smith, selling 24,000 in its release week. The album has sold 81,200 copies in the US as of May 2017.

== Track listing ==
No.	Title	Writer(s)	Length
1.	"Backroad Song"	Granger Smith, Frank Rogers	3:57
2.	"Tonight"	Smith, Rogers	3:49
3.	"Remington"	Smith, Rogers	3:56
4.	"If the Boot Fits"	Jordan Schmidt, Andy Albert, Mitchell Tenpenny	2:50
5.	"Tailgate Town"	Smith, Rogers	5:47
6.	"Blue Collar Dollars"	Westin Davis, Jaron Boyer, Josh Mirenda	3:19
7.	"Crazy as Me" (featuring Brooke Eden)	Smith, Rogers	4:15
8.	"Likin' Love Songs"	Smith, Rogers	3:03
9.	"Tractor"	Smith	3:33
10.	"Echo"	Smith, Rogers	4:16
11.	"Around the Sun"	Smith, Rogers	3:34
12.	"5 More Minutes" (GS Reloaded Bonus Track)	Smith	3:25
13.	"Country Boy Love" (featuring Earl Dibbles Jr.) (EDJ Reloaded Bonus Track)	Earl Dibbles Jr.	3:32
14.	"City Boy Stuck" (featuring Earl Dibbles Jr.)	Dibbles, Austin Outlaw, Tyler Smith, Chris Lee	4:25
15.	"Merica" (featuring Earl Dibbles Jr.)	Dibbles, Outlaw, Lee, Dusty Saxton	4:30

== Personnel ==
- Geoff Ashcroft – electric guitar
- Richard Barrow – background vocals
- Stewart Blake – background vocals
- Mike Brignardello – bass guitar
- Mitch Connell – piano, organ
- Eric Darken – percussion
- Milo Deering – mandolin
- Earl Dibbles Jr. – lead vocals on "Country Boy Love", "City Boy Stuck", and "Merica"
- Brooke Eden – duet vocals on "Crazy as Me"
- Shannon Forrest – drums
- Kenny Greenberg – electric guitar
- Wes Hightower – background vocals
- Michael Holleman – drums
- Todd Howard – electric guitar, background vocals
- Chad Jeffers – Dobro
- Mike Johnson – Dobro
- Tim Lauer – keyboards
- Chris Lee – background vocals
- Jeremy Lee – background vocals
- Jerry McPherson – electric guitar
- Rob McNelley – electric guitar
- Frank Maglin – background vocals
- Carl Miner – mandolin
- Gordon Mote – piano
- Danny Rader – banjo, bouzouki, acoustic guitar, mandolin
- Michael Rhodes – bass guitar
- Jerry Roe – drums, percussion
- Frank Rogers – drum programming, electric guitar, background vocals
- Manny Rogers – background vocals
- Dusty Saxton – drum programming, drums, snare drum, keyboard programming, background vocals
- Bull Shipley – background vocals
- Amber Smith – background vocals
- Granger Smith – acoustic guitar, electric guitar, keyboards, percussion, lead vocals, background vocals
- Tyler Smith – background vocals
- Bryan Sutton – banjo, acoustic guitar, mandolin
- Heath Tiner – background vocals
- Derek Wells – electric guitar, bouzouki, mandolin
- Brian David Wills – background vocals
- Jonathan Wisinski – bass guitar, background vocals

== Charts ==
=== Weekly charts ===
Chart (2016)	Peak position
Australian Albums (ARIA)	68
Canadian Albums (Billboard)	41
US Billboard 200	12
US Top Country Albums (Billboard)	3
US Independent Albums (Billboard)	1

=== Year-end charts ===
Chart (2016)	Position
US Top Country Albums (Billboard)	42

=== Singles ===
Year	Single	Peak chart positions				
Year	Single	US Country	US Country Airplay	US	CAN Country	CAN
2015	"Backroad Song"	4	1	49	2	69
2016	"If the Boot Fits"	14	6	80	9	40
