= Granger Smith =

American singer and songwriter

- Also known as: Earl Dibbles Jr.
- Born: Granger Kelly Smith; September 4, 1979 (age 46); Dallas, Texas, U.S.
- Genres: Country
- Occupations: Singer-songwriter; radio host; minister
- Instruments: Vocals; guitar
- Years active: 1998–present
- Labels: Thirty Tigers; Wheelhouse
- Spouse: Amber Emily Bartlett (m. 2010)
- Website: grangersmith.com; aftermidnite.iheart.com

Granger Kelly Smith (born September 4, 1979), also known by his stage name, Earl Dibbles Jr., is an American Southern Baptist minister, radio show host and former country music singer and songwriter. He has released eleven studio albums, two live albums, and two EPs. "Backroad Song" became his lone number-one single in 2016 and he had a second top ten hit with "If the Boot Fits" in 2017.

Smith hosts the nationally syndicated radio show After Midnite with Granger Smith. It is heard on more than 100 country music radio stations in the U.S., mostly those owned by iHeartMedia, Inc. His co-host is Anne Hudson and Anthony "Antman" Allen serves as executive producer. The show airs in most cities from 12 to 6 a.m. local time. It broadcasts to around 4 million listeners every night.

== Early life ==
Smith was born in Dallas, Texas. At 14, he became interested in music and decided to pursue it as a hobby, teaching himself guitar. After graduating from Lake Highlands High School in 1998, Smith attended Texas A&M University in College Station, Texas, and was a member of the Corps of Cadets.

After his second year, he moved from Texas to Nashville after signing a songwriting contract with EMI Music Publishing. Later, in 2005, he returned to Texas and re-enrolled at Texas A&M to complete his degree. He continued to play live and record music, including "We Bleed Maroon", an homage to his alma mater and fellow Aggies.

== Career ==
Granger Smith was signed to a contract at the age of nineteen in Nashville. He performed three times at the White House, and in 2008 he traveled to perform for soldiers in Iraq and Kuwait. His 2013 album Dirt Road Driveway peaked at number 15 on US country charts and number 11 on US indie charts.

In August 2015, Smith announced he had signed with Broken Bow Records imprint Wheelhouse Records. Smith's EP 4x4 was co-produced by Smith and Frank Rogers. The album debuted on the Top Country Albums chart at number 6, and reached number 51 on Billboard 200. The lead single from the album was "Backroad Song", which sold over 32,000 downloads in its first week of release.

Some of Smith's recordings made use of a stage name named Earl Dibbles Jr.

In December 2018, Smith released a single from his soundtrack album called They Were There, A Hero's Documentary, which came out on November 30, 2018. "They Were There" and its music video came out on the same day, December 7, 2018.

On July 19, 2019, Smith performed for an audience of 86,000 as the opening act for the Garth Brooks Stadium Tour at the Albertsons Stadium in Boise.

On January 1, 2022, Smith took over After MidNite, Premiere Networks' long-running overnight country radio show. The show had previously been hosted by Blair Garner, then Cody Alan. In addition to being heard overnight on more than 100 country music radio stations, it is available as a podcast.

Also in 2022, he joined Canadian country music group High Valley on their single "Country Music, Girls and Trucks".

In November 2022, Smith released his eleventh studio album Moonrise. The album was featured in the Pure Flix film of the same name, which Smith starred in, released on December 15, 2022.

On April 11, 2023, Smith announced that he would be leaving country music touring in order to focus on ministry at his church in Austin, Texas. His "Like A River Tour" served as his farewell tour. The tour concluded on August 26, 2023.

== Personal life ==
He married Amber Emily Bartlett on February 11, 2010. They met on the set of the music video for Smith's song "Don't Listen to the Radio", and she has been featured in several of his music videos since. The couple has one daughter and three sons.

On June 6, 2019, Smith announced that the couple's youngest son, River Kelly Smith, had died following a drowning accident at their home. River had previously appeared in the video for "Happens Like That".

On March 11, 2021, Smith and his wife announced they were having their fourth child, a boy, in August. Their son, Maverick Beckham Smith, was born August 20, 2021.

Smith and his two brothers, Parker and Tyler, own and operate Yee Yee Apparel, an online retailer in their hometown of Georgetown, Texas. The Smiths also run a YouTube channel called Yee Yee Life, which primarily features Parker Smith shooting various firearms at objects to see if they can withstand ammunition.

Smith is a Christian.

== Discography ==
- Waiting on Forever (1999)
- Memory Rd. (2004)
- Pockets of Pesos (2005)
- Livin' Like a Lonestar (2007)
- Don't Listen to the Radio (2009)
- Poets & Prisoners (2011)
- Dirt Road Driveway (2013)
- Remington (2016)
- When the Good Guys Win (2017)
- Country Things (2020)
- Moonrise (2022)

== Tours ==
Headlining:

- American Soldiers Iraq Tour (2008)
- Yee Yee Nation Tour (2013–14)
- Remington Tour (2016)
- Granger Across Merica Pledge of Allegiance Tour (2016)
- Don't Tread On Me Tour (2017–18)
- Country Things Tour (2021–2022)
- Like A River: Farewell Tour (2023)
- A Night With Granger Smith Tour (2025)

Supporting:

- Dig Your Roots Tour (2016)
- Luke Bryan Farm Tour (2016)
- Huntin', Fishin' and Lovin' Every Day Tour (2017)
- Live Forever Tour (2019)

== Filmography ==
Title	Year	Role	Notes	Ref.
Granger Smith: A Documentary	2014	Himself	Director and Producer	
They Were There, A Hero's Documentary	2018	Himself	Director and Producer	
Moonrise	2022	Will Brown	Lead actor, producer	

== Books ==
Year	Title	Publisher	ISBN	Pages
2018	If You're City, If You're Country	BMG	194702616X	104
2023	Like A River	Thomas Nelson	88113992X	208
2024	Up Toward the Light	Thomas Nelson	1400241723	34
2026	Poison in the Well	Thomas Nelson	140033442X	208

== Awards and nominations ==
Year	Award	Category	Recipient/Work	Result	Ref
2016	BMI Awards	BMI Country Award	"Backroad Song"	Won	
2017	iHeartRadio Music Awards	Best New Country Artist	Granger Smith	Nominated	
2020	CMT Music Awards	Best Quarantine Song	"Don't Cough on Me"	Won	
2023	K-LOVE Awards	Film/Television Impact	"Moonrise"	Won	
